= South Oxfordshire District Council elections =

English elections

South Oxfordshire District Council, a non-metropolitan district council in Oxfordshire, England is elected every four years.

Following the boundary changes in 2003, 48 councillors were elected from 29 wards. As a result of The South Oxfordshire (Electoral Changes) Order 2014, the number of councillors/wards reduced to 36/21 from the 2015 local elections.

== Council elections ==
Composition of the council
Year	Conservative	Labour	Liberal Democrats (Note: Includes totals for the predecessors of the Liberal Democrats, the Liberal Party and SDP (both of which participated in the Alliance).)	Green (Note: Includes totals for the predecessors of the Green Party of England and Wales, the Ecology Party and Green Party UK.)	HRG	Independents & Others	Council control after election
Local government reorganisation; council established (62 seats)
1973	25	9	7	–	–	21	No overall control
1976	35	7	4	0	–	16	Conservative
New ward boundaries (59 seats)
1979	36	8	2	0	–	13	Conservative
New ward boundaries (56 seats)
1983	37	7	4	0	–	8	Conservative
1987	38	8	4	0	–	6	Conservative
New ward boundaries (50 seats)
1991	29	5	8	0	–	8	No overall control
1995	9	13	21	0	–	7	No overall control
1999	20	7	20	0	–	3	No overall control
New ward boundaries (48 seats)
2003	27	4	9	0	4	4	Conservative
2007	38	1	6	0	1	2	Conservative
2011	33	4	4	0	2	5	Conservative
New ward boundaries (36 seats)
2015	33	1	1	0	1	0	Conservative
2019	10	3	12	5	3	3	No overall control
2023	1	3	21	8	3	0	Liberal Democrats

== Election results ==
	Overall control	Conservative	Lib Dem	Labour	Green	HRG	Independent
2023	Liberal Democrat	1	21	3	8	3	-
2019	NOC	10	12	3	5	3	3
2015	Conservative	33	1	1	-	1	-
2011	Conservative	33	4	4	-	2	5
2007	Conservative	38	6	1	-	1	2
2003	Conservative	27	9	4	-	4	4

== Results maps ==
2003 results map

2007 results map

2011 results map

2015 results map

2019 results map

2023 results map

== By-election results ==
=== 1995-1999 ===
Didcot South By-Election 14 November 1996
Party	Candidate	Votes	%	±%
Labour		567	49.7	
Liberal Democrats		319	28.0	
Conservative		254	22.3	
Majority		248	21.7	
Turnout		1,140	24.5	
Labour hold		Swing		

Kidmore End By-Election 6 February 1997
Party	Candidate	Votes	%	±%
Conservative		409	62.0	
Liberal Democrats		215	32.6	
Labour		36	5.4	
Majority		194	29.4	
Turnout		660		
Conservative hold		Swing		

Horspath By-Election 9 December 1998
Party	Candidate	Votes	%	±%
Liberal Democrats		452	80.0	+14.0
Conservative		113	20.0	+20.0
Majority		339	60.0	
Turnout		565	53.1	
Liberal Democrats hold		Swing		

=== 1999-2003 ===
Cholsey By-Election 16 March 2000
Party	Candidate	Votes	%	±%
Liberal Democrats		652	55.5	+1.2
Conservative		524	44.6	−1.2
Majority		128	10.9	
Turnout		1,176	38.2	
Liberal Democrats hold		Swing		

Henley By-Election 22 February 2001
Party	Candidate	Votes	%	±%
Conservative		827	49.8	+12.7
Independent		585	35.2	+8.5
Independent		249	15.0	+15.0
Majority		242	14.6	
Turnout		1,661	19.2	
Conservative hold		Swing		

Didcot South By-Election 11 October 2001
Party	Candidate	Votes	%	±%
Labour		676	52.1	+2.0
Conservative		310	23.9	−4.9
Liberal Democrats		270	20.8	+8.2
Green		42	3.2	−5.2
Majority		366	28.2	
Turnout		1,298		
Labour hold		Swing		

Sonning Common By-Election 1 November 2001
Party	Candidate	Votes	%	±%
Conservative		561	50.4	+15.7
Liberal Democrats		253	31.7	−0.9
Labour		200	18.0	−2.2
Majority		208	18.7	
Turnout		1,014	36.8	
Conservative gain from Liberal Democrats		Swing		

Watlington By-Election 10 October 2002
Party	Candidate	Votes	%	±%
Conservative	David Crossman	441	61.1	+23.8
Liberal Democrats		281	38.9	−23.8
Majority		160	22.2	
Turnout		722	32.2	
Conservative gain from Liberal Democrats		Swing		

=== 2003-2007 ===
Sonning Common By-Election 23 September 2004
Party	Candidate	Votes	%	±%
Conservative	Bruce Harrison	591	70.6	−0.5
Liberal Democrats	Caroline Wardle	177	21.1	−7.8
Labour	Mary Stiles	69	8.2	+8.2
Majority		414	49.5	
Turnout		837	19.6	
Conservative hold		Swing		

Shiplake By-Election 5 May 2005
Party	Candidate	Votes	%	±%
Conservative	Nigel Jones	1,649	63.9	
Liberal Democrats	Caroline Wardle	535	20.7	
Labour	Janet Matthews	397	15.4	
Majority		1,114	43.2	
Turnout		2,581		
Conservative hold		Swing		

Wallingford North By-Election 27 October 2005
Party	Candidate	Votes	%	±%
Conservative	Imran Lokhan	479	51.5	+23.5
Liberal Democrats	Alec Hayton	374	40.7	+13.9
Green	Melanie Belgrove Jones	72	7.8	+7.8
Majority		100	10.8	
Turnout		920	22.0	
Conservative gain from Independent		Swing		

Watlington By-Election 23 March 2006
Party	Candidate	Votes	%	±%
Conservative	Angela Paterson	737	72.9	+19.9
Liberal Democrats	Bernard Moseley	274	27.1	−19.9
Majority		463	45.8	
Turnout		1,011	24.8	
Conservative hold		Swing		

=== 2007-2011 ===
Thame North By-Election 30 October 2008
Party	Candidate	Votes	%	±%
Conservative	Michael Welply	423	50.5	+8.3
Liberal Democrats	Jeannette Matelot	287	34.3	−9.5
Labour	May Stiles	127	15.2	+1.3
Majority		136	16.2	
Turnout		837	18.9	
Conservative hold		Swing		

Chiltern Woods By-Election 19 March 2009
Party	Candidate	Votes	%	±%
Conservative	Judith Nimmo-Smith	382	79.4	+9.4
Liberal Democrats	Julian Allison	99	20.6	+5.2
Majority		283	58.8	
Turnout		481	25.9	
Conservative hold		Swing		

Henley South By-Election 11 February 2010
Party	Candidate	Votes	%	±%
Residents	Elizabeth Hodgkin	642	52.5	+0.6
Conservative	David Silvester	472	38.6	+10.5
Liberal Democrats	George Levy	110	9.0	+0.2
Majority		170	13.9	
Turnout		1,224		
Conservative hold		Swing		

Crowmarsh By-Election 3 June 2010
Party	Candidate	Votes	%	±%
Liberal Democrats	John Griffin	327	55.9	+10.1
Conservative	Kristina Crabbe	258	44.1	−10.1
Majority		69	11.8	
Turnout		585	32.0	
Liberal Democrats gain from Conservative		Swing		

=== 2011-2015 ===
Chinnor By-Election 10 May 2012
Party	Candidate	Votes	%	±%
Conservative	Lynn Lloyd	591	48.3	−1.4
Independent	Martin Wright	449	36.7	+36.7
Labour	Simon Stone	184	15.0	−0.4
Majority		142	11.6	
Turnout		1,224		
Conservative hold		Swing		

Didcot All Saints By-Election 25 October 2012
Party	Candidate	Votes	%	±%
Labour	Denise MacDonald	436	47.0	+4.3
Conservative	Jane Murphy	340	36.7	−5.7
Liberal Democrats	Andrew Jones	151	16.3	+1.4
Majority		96	10.4	
Turnout		927		
Labour hold		Swing		

=== 2015-2019 ===
Sandford and the Wittenhams By-Election 8 October 2015
Party	Candidate	Votes	%	±%
Conservative	Sue Lawson	290	42.8	−4.3
Liberal Democrats	Simon Thompson	249	36.7	+16.3
Labour	Jim Merritt	89	13.1	−3.7
Green	Sam Casey-Rerhaye	50	7.4	−8.3
Majority		41	6.0	
Turnout		678		
Conservative hold		Swing		

Sonning Common By-Election 22 October 2015
Party	Candidate	Votes	%	±%
Conservative	William Hall	635	66.0	+5.6
Labour	David Winchester	200	20.8	+4.7
Liberal Democrats	Sue Cooper	127	13.2	+2.5
Majority		435	45.2	
Turnout		962		
Conservative hold		Swing		

Didcot South By-Election 13 July 2017
Party	Candidate	Votes	%	±%
Labour	Mocky Khan	631	43.6	+12.6
Conservative	Jackie Billington	528	36.5	+4.1
Liberal Democrats	Veronika Williams	127	20.0	+3.7
Majority		103	7.1	
Turnout		1,448		
Labour hold		Swing		

Didcot West By-Election 13 July 2017
Party	Candidate	Votes	%	±%
Conservative	Ian Snowdon	429	43.2	+3.4
Labour	Denise Macdonald	393	39.5	+12.6
Liberal Democrats	Ian Smith	172	17.3	+1.3
Majority		36	3.6	
Turnout		994		
Conservative hold		Swing		

Haseley Brook By-Election 19 October 2017
Party	Candidate	Votes	%	±%
Conservative	Caroline Newton	N/A	N/A	N/A
Conservative hold		Swing		

Benson and Crowmarsh By-Election 7 June 2018
Party	Candidate	Votes	%	±%
Liberal Democrats	Sue Cooper	1,048	57.4	+27.2
Conservative	Domenic Papa	658	36.0	−10.6
Labour	William Sorenson	121	6.6	−4.0
Majority		390	21.3	
Turnout		1,827		
Liberal Democrats gain from Conservative		Swing		

=== 2019-2023 ===
Didcot North East By-Election 6 May 2021
Party	Candidate	Votes	%	±%
Conservative	Andrea Warren	1,113	40.7	+21.8
Liberal Democrats	Paul Giesberg	953	34.8	+9.6
Labour	Nick Hards	670	24.5	+8.0
Majority		160	5.8	
Turnout		2,736		
Conservative gain from Independent		Swing		

Forest Hill and Holton By-Election 6 May 2021
Party	Candidate	Votes	%	±%
Liberal Democrats	Tim Bearder	907	64.3	+8.1
Conservative	John Walsh	503	35.7	+1.7
Majority		404	28.7	
Turnout		1,410		
Liberal Democrats hold		Swing		

=== 2023-2027 ===
Cholsey By-Election 5 December 2024
Party	Candidate	Votes	%	±%
Liberal Democrats	Crispin Topping	949	62.2	
Conservative	Alan Thompson	362	23.7	
SDP	Kym Pomlett	116	7.6	
Labour	Jim Broadbent	71	4.7	
Independent	Karen Shoobridge	28	1.8	
Majority		587	38.5	
Turnout		1,526		
Liberal Democrats hold		Swing		

Watlington By-Election 1 May 2025
Party	Candidate	Votes	%	±%
Liberal Democrats	Benjamin Higgins	679	46.1	−23.5
Conservative	Richard Riley	585	39.7	+9.3
Green	Lucie Ponsford	174	11.8	+11.8
Labour	Nicholas Palmer	34	2.3	+2.3
Majority		94	6.4	
Turnout		1,472		
Liberal Democrats hold		Swing		

Wheatley By-Election 1 May 2025
Party	Candidate	Votes	%	±%
Liberal Democrats	Peter Ramsdale	573	46.7	−19.9
Conservative	Daniel Masters	428	34.9	+1.5
Green	Amanda Rowe-Jones	148	12.1	+12.1
Labour	Craig Wilson	79	6.4	+6.4
Majority		145	11.8	
Turnout		1,228		
Liberal Democrats hold		Swing		
