= Oxfordshire County Council elections =

Local elections in England

Oxfordshire County Council is elected every four years.

== Election results ==
Year	Conservative	Liberal Democrats (Note: Liberal Party, 1973–1981; SDP–Liberal Alliance, 1985.)	Labour	Green (Note: Ecology Party, 1981–1985; Green Party (UK), 1989.)	Reform	HRG	Independent	Council control after election
1973	37	3	21	–	–	–	9	Conservative
1977 (Note: Boundary changes reduced the number of seats by one.)	61	2	3	–	–	–	3	Conservative
1981	36	10 (Note: 9 Liberal, 1 SDP)	19	0	–	–	4	Conservative
1985 (Note: Boundary changes increased the number of seats by one.)	31	18	20	0	–	–	1	No overall control
1989	33	13	23	0	–	–	1	No overall control
1993	25	20	24	1	–	–	0	No overall control
1997	27	19	22	2	–	–	0	No overall control
2001	25	19	24	2	–	–	0	No overall control
2005 (Note: Boundary changes increased the number of seats by four.)	43	17	9	5	–	0	0	Conservative
2009	52	10	9	2	–	–	1	Conservative
2013 (Note: Boundary changes reduced the number of seats by eleven.)	31	11	15	2	–	0	4	No overall control
2017	31	13	14	0	–	1	4	No overall control
2021	21	21	16	3	–	1	1	No overall control
2025 (Note: Boundary changes increased the number of seats by six.)	10	36	12	7	1	1	2 (Note: Including 1 Oxford Independent Alliance)	Liberal Democrats

== County result maps ==
2005 results map

2009 results map

2013 results map

2017 results map

2021 results map

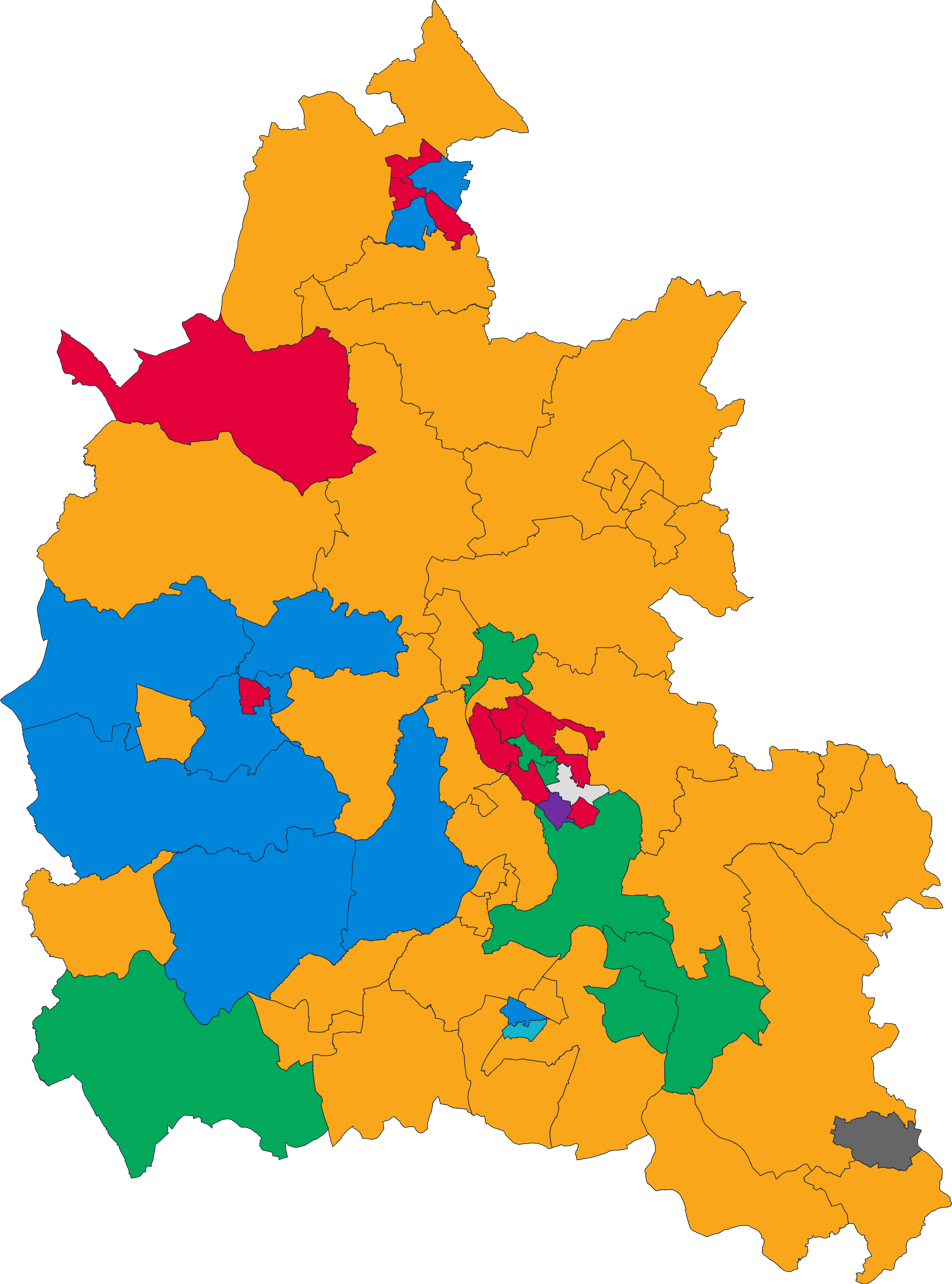
2025 results map

== By-election results ==
=== 1997-2001 ===
Wolvercote By-Election 7 May 1998
Party	Candidate	Votes	%	±%
Liberal Democrats		1,085	47.4	+4.9
Conservative		582	25.4	+0.4
Labour		352	15.4	−5.7
Green		270	11.8	+0.4
Majority		503	22.0	
Turnout		2,289		
Liberal Democrats hold		Swing		

Temple Cowley By-Election 28 October 1999
Party	Candidate	Votes	%	±%
Liberal Democrats		537	42.5	−9.0
Labour		520	41.1	+5.8
Conservative		124	9.8	+1.3
Green		83	6.6	+1.9
Majority		17	1.4	
Turnout		1,264	22.8	
Liberal Democrats gain from Labour		Swing		

West By-Election 28 October 1999
Party	Candidate	Votes	%	±%
Labour		630	40.0	−0.7
Liberal Democrats		597	37.9	+8.1
Green		198	12.6	−7.6
Conservative		127	8.1	−1.2
Independent		22	1.4	+1.4
Majority		33	2.1	
Turnout		1,574	26.0	
Labour hold		Swing		

Banbury Ruscote By-Election 16 December 1999
Party	Candidate	Votes	%	±%
Conservative		348	48.0	+27.0
Labour		314	43.9	−20.1
Liberal Democrats		58	8.1	−6.9
Majority		29	4.1	
Turnout		715	12.8	
Conservative gain from Labour		Swing		

Sonning Common By-Election 16 December 1999
Party	Candidate	Votes	%	±%
Liberal Democrats		731	47.0	+19.8
Conservative		651	41.9	−10.3
Labour		172	11.1	−4.1
Majority		80	5.1	
Turnout		1,554	26.0	
Liberal Democrats gain from Conservative		Swing		

=== 2001-2005 ===
Wolvercote By-Election 2 May 2002
Party	Candidate	Votes	%	±%
Liberal Democrats		1,063	40.4	+9.7
Green		769	29.2	−5.2
Conservative		530	20.1	+0.0
Labour		271	10.3	−3.7
Majority		294	11.2	
Turnout		2,633	47.4	
Liberal Democrats gain from Green		Swing		

Deddington By-Election 3 October 2002
Party	Candidate	Votes	%	±%
Conservative		1,172	59.6	+7.8
Liberal Democrats		588	30.0	−7.0
Labour		205	10.4	+10.4
Majority		584	29.6	
Turnout		1,965	25.2	
Conservative hold		Swing		

Wolvercote By-Election 27 November 2003
Party	Candidate	Votes	%	±%
Liberal Democrats		732	39.6	+8.9
Green		693	37.5	+3.1
Conservative		327	17.7	−3.1
Labour		95	5.1	−8.9
Majority		39	2.1	
Turnout		1,847	31.9	
Liberal Democrats hold		Swing		

Dorchester By-Election 19 February 2004
Party	Candidate	Votes	%	±%
Conservative		1,070		
Labour		152		
Green		87		
Majority				
Turnout			29.0	
Conservative hold		Swing		

Henley South By-Election 19 February 2004
Party	Candidate	Votes	%	±%
Conservative		920	54.9	−5.1
Resident		405	24.2	+24.2
Liberal Democrats		118	7.0	−19.7
Independent		103	6.1	+6.1
Green		66	3.9	−3.5
Labour		63	3.8	−2.1
Majority		515	30.7	
Turnout		1,675	26.0	
Conservative hold		Swing		

Hanborough By-Election 10 June 2004
Party	Candidate	Votes	%	±%
Liberal Democrats	Colin James	1,657	52.9	+19.0
Conservative	Ian Hudspeth	1,476	47.1	+1.1
Majority		181	5.8	
Turnout		3,133	53.2	
Liberal Democrats gain from Conservative		Swing		

=== 2005-2009 ===
Banbury Grimsbury & Castle By-Election 4 May 2006
Party	Candidate	Votes	%	±%
Conservative	Carole Bonner	880	51.5	+14.4
Labour	Royston Mold	488	28.6	−6.3
Liberal Democrats	Choudry Anjum	340	19.9	−2.2
Majority		392	22.9	
Turnout		1,708	24.6	
Conservative hold		Swing		

Eynsham By-Election 4 May 2006
Party	Candidate	Votes	%	±%
Conservative	Charles Mathew	1,652	53.0	+17.9
Liberal Democrats	Stuart Brooks	1,034	33.2	−11.1
Green	Xanthe Bevis	254	8.2	+1.2
Labour	Richard Kelsall	176	5.6	−8.0
Majority		618	19.8	
Turnout		3,116	43.9	
Conservative gain from Liberal Democrats		Swing		

Carterton South West By-Election 21 June 2007
Party	Candidate	Votes	%	±%
Conservative	Peter Handley	934	67.5	+15.8
Liberal Democrats	Peter Madden	348	25.1	−2.1
Labour	David Wesson	102	7.4	−10.6
Majority		586	42.4	
Turnout		1,384		
Conservative hold		Swing		

Grove and Wantage By-Election 13 February 2008
Party	Candidate	Votes	%	±%
Liberal Democrats	Jenny Hannaby	1,901	46.7	+11.1
Conservative	Bill Melotti	1,786	43.9	+11.0
Labour	Jean Nunn-Price	382	9.4	−14.3
Majority		115	2.8	
Turnout		4,069		
Liberal Democrats hold		Swing		

Wallingford By-Election 13 March 2008
Party	Candidate	Votes	%	±%
Independent	Lynda Atkins	867	65.6	+65.6
Conservative	Patricia Dawe	386	29.2	−4.6
Labour	Charles Gill	69	5.2	−8.2
Majority		481	36.4	
Turnout		1,322	19.7	
Independent gain from Liberal Democrats		Swing		

Kidlington and Yarnton By-Election 1 May 2008
Party	Candidate	Votes	%	±%
Conservative	Michael Gibbard	2,921	52.2	+13.7
Liberal Democrats	Suzanne Wilson-Higgins	1,681	30.0	−1.4
Labour	Chris Robins	675	12.1	−11.0
Green	Janet Warren	321	5.7	−1.3
Majority		1,240	22.2	
Turnout		5,598	39.5	
Conservative hold		Swing		

=== 2009-2013 ===
Watlington By-Election 19 April 2012
Party	Candidate	Votes	%	±%
Conservative	Caroline Newton	865	62.2	−6.6
Liberal Democrats	Nicholas Hancock	259	18.6	+3.6
Labour	James Merritt	157	11.3	+6.7
UKIP	Jonathan Kent	110	7.9	+7.9
Majority		606	43.6	
Turnout		1,391		
Conservative hold		Swing		

Cowley and Littlemore By-Election 12 July 2012
Party	Candidate	Votes	%	±%
Labour	Gill Sanders	1,606	64.6	+24.4
Conservative	Judith Harley	384	15.4	−7.3
Green	Paul Skinner	330	13.3	−9.0
Liberal Democrats	Mike Tait	167	6.7	−8.2
Majority		1,222	49.1	
Turnout		2,487		
Labour hold		Swing		

Cowley and Littlemore By-Election 12 July 2012
Party	Candidate	Votes	%	±%
Labour	Gill Sanders	1,606	64.6	+24.4
Conservative	Judith Harley	384	15.4	−7.3
Green	Paul Skinner	330	13.3	−9.0
Liberal Democrats	Mike Tait	167	6.7	−8.2
Majority		1,222	49.1	
Turnout		2,487		
Labour hold		Swing		

=== 2013-2017 ===
Chalgrove and Watlington By-Election 27 March 2014
Party	Candidate	Votes	%	±%
Conservative	Stephen Harrod	871	41.8	−15.9
Liberal Democrats	Susan Cooper	629	30.2	+12.4
UKIP	Craig Laird	311	14.9	+14.9
Labour	Paul Collins	159	7.6	−5.0
Green	Colin Tudge	116	5.6	−6.3
Majority		242	11.6	
Turnout		2,086		
Conservative hold		Swing		

Leys By-Election 27 November 2014
Party	Candidate	Votes	%	±%
Labour	Steve Curran	879	70.4	−11.1
UKIP	Dave Slater	168	13.5	+13.5
Conservative	Samuel Burgess	88	7.0	−0.6
Green	Ann Duncan	57	4.6	−2.8
Liberal Democrats	Lesley Mallinder	30	2.4	−1.1
TUSC	James Morbin	27	2.2	+2.2
Majority		711	56.9	
Turnout		1,249		
Labour hold		Swing		

Witney West and Bampton By-Election 7 May 2015
Party	Candidate	Votes	%	±%
Conservative	James Mills	3,465	59.0	+10.2
Labour	Calvert McGibbon	800	13.6	−0.3
UKIP	Jim Stanley	678	11.5	−13.4
Liberal Democrats	Liz Leffman	472	8.0	+2.5
Green	Nick Owen	462	7.9	+1.0
Majority		2,665	45.3	
Turnout		5,877		
Conservative hold		Swing		

=== 2017-2021 ===
Iffley Fields and St Mary’s By-Election 18 October 2018
Party	Candidate	Votes	%	±%
Labour	Damian Haywood	1,162	48.6	+1.7
Green	Arthur Wiliams	1,087	45.4	+4.7
Conservative	Paul Sims	100	4.2	−1.4
Liberal Democrats	Josie Procter	43	1.8	−5.0
Majority		75	3.1	
Turnout		2,392	33	
Labour hold		Swing		

Grove and Wantage By-Election 15 November 2018
Party	Candidate	Votes	%	±%
Liberal Democrats	Nicola Hanna	1,925	47.9	+4.5
Conservative	Benjamin Mabbett	1,447	36.0	+0.7
Labour	David Gernon	459	11.4	−2.0
Green	Kevin Harris	185	4.6	−3.3
Majority		478	11.9	
Turnout		4,016	27.8	
Liberal Democrats hold		Swing		

Wheatley By-Election 29 November 2018
Party	Candidate	Votes	%	±%
Liberal Democrats	Timothy Bearder	1,380	61.0	+15.8
Conservative	John Walsh	705	31.2	−11.7
Labour	Michael Nixon	178	7.9	−4.0
Majority		675	29.8	
Turnout		2,263	31.0	
Liberal Democrats hold		Swing		

Wallingford By-Election 28 November 2019
Party	Candidate	Votes	%	±%
Green	Pete Sudbury	998	40.9	+29.9
Conservative	Adrian Lloyd	755	31.0	+6.9
Independent	Elaine Hornsby	483	19.8	+19.8
Labour	George Kneeshaw	202	8.3	−4.2
Majority		243	10.0	
Turnout		2,438	30	
Green gain from Independent		Swing		

=== 2021-2025 ===
Rose Hill and Littlemore By-Election 2 March 2023
Party	Candidate	Votes	%	±%
Labour	Trish Elphinstone	1,169	43.9	−8.4
Independent	Michael Evans	1,046	39.3	+39.3
Conservative	Timothy Patmore	227	8.5	−9.1
Green	David Thomas	120	4.5	−8.6
Liberal Democrats	Theo Jupp	75	2.8	−2.6
TUSC	Callum Joyce	23	0.9	+0.9
Majority		123	4.6	
Turnout		2,268	34	
Labour hold		Swing		

Sutton Courtenay and Marcham By-Election 20 June 2024
Party	Candidate	Votes	%	±%
Liberal Democrats	Peter Stevens	702	36.6	−12.1
Conservative	James Plumb	656	34.2	−5.7
Green	Aidan Reilly	375	19.6	+19.6
Labour	Jim Broadbent	183	9.6	−1.7
Majority		46	2.4	
Turnout		1,916	34	
Liberal Democrats hold		Swing		

=== 2025-2029 ===
Chesterton and Launton By-Election 3 September 2026
Party	Candidate	Votes	%	±%
Liberal Democrats	James Hartley	985	41.7	+8.8
Conservative	Sandy Dallimore	683	28.9	+0.6
Reform	Ian Hodgson	547	23.2	−3.5
Labour	Gregory Fish	75	3.2	−2.3
Green	Meri Mosharrafa	71	3.0	−3.6
Majority		302	12.8	
Turnout		2,361		
Liberal Democrats hold		Swing		
