= 2015 South Oxfordshire District Council election =

2015 UK local government election

← 2011	7 May 2015	2019 →
Party	Conservative	Labour	Liberal Democrats
Popular vote	65,861	21,296	17,865
Percentage	50.65%	16.38%	13.74%
Party	Henley Residents	Independent
Popular vote	3,370	4,863
Percentage	2.59%	3.74%
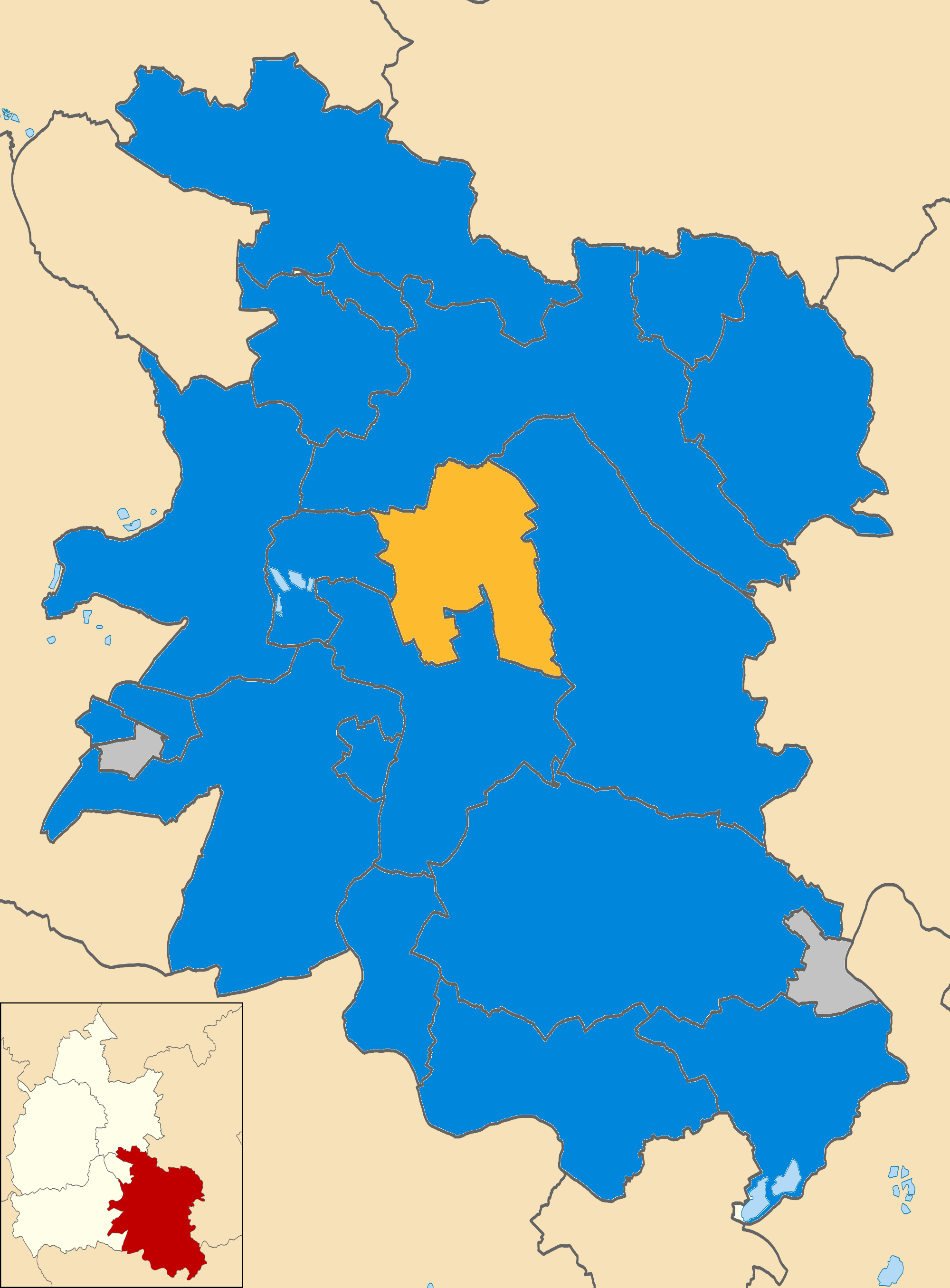
- Wards of South Oxfordshire District Council

The 2015 South Oxfordshire District Council election was held on 7 May 2015 to elect members of South Oxfordshire District Council in England. This was on the same day as other local elections.

Elections were held for all seats on the council. After the 2011 South Oxfordshire District Council election the Boundary Commission for England had revised South Oxfordshire's district ward boundaries and reduced the number of seats from 48 to 36. the 2015 elections were the first to be held for the new revised wards.

A total of 96,644 votes were cast at polling stations and 13,527 postal votes were received. This amounted to a 66.5% turnout.

The Conservative Party won 33 of the 36 new seats. The Labour Party, Liberal Democrats and Henley Residents Group each won one seat. No other party or independent candidate won any seats. The Conservative Party kept overall control of the council, with its majority increased to 30.

== Results ==
South Oxfordshire District Council elections result 2015
Party	Seats	Gains	Losses	Net gain/loss	Seats %	Votes %	Votes	+/−
Conservative	33	0	0	0	91.67	50.65	65,861	-
Labour	1	0	3	-3	2.78	16.38	21,296	+
Liberal Democrats	1	0	3	-3	2.78	13.74	17,865	-
Henley Residents	1	0	2	-2	2.78	2.59	3,370	-
UKIP	0	0	0	0	0	6.48	8,423	+
Green	0	0	0	0	0	6.43	8,361	+
Independent	0	0	5	-5	0	3.74	4,863	-

The Conservative Party's share of votes fell from 53.53% in 2011 to 50.65% in 2015. However, as a result of the new boundaries the Conservatives still won 33 seats in 2015, the same number as in 2011. And as the Boundary Commission had reduced the number of seats, this represents an increase in the share of seats from almost 69% in 2011 to nearly 92% in 2015.

The Labour Party increased its share of votes from 14.92% in 2011 to 16.70% in 2015, overtaking the Liberal Democrats as the party with the second largest number of votes in the district. But as a result of the new ward boundaries and reduced number of wards the number of Labour members on the district council was reduced from four to one.

The Liberal Democrats' share of votes fell from 15.89% in 2011 to 11.93% in 2015. Combined with the new ward boundaries and reduced number of wards, Liberal Democrat members on the district council were reduced from four to one.

In 2011 five independent candidates were elected to the district council. In 2015 four of them did not seek re-election. One, Mark Gray, was a candidate again in 2015 but was not re-elected.

The boundary revision reduced Henley-on-Thames from two wards which each elected two members in 2011, to one ward which elected three members in 2015. Henley Residents Group's share of votes in Henley fell from an average of 37.17% across the two wards in 2011 to 20.43% in the one new ward in 2015. These factors combined to reduce the number of HRG members on the district council from three to one.

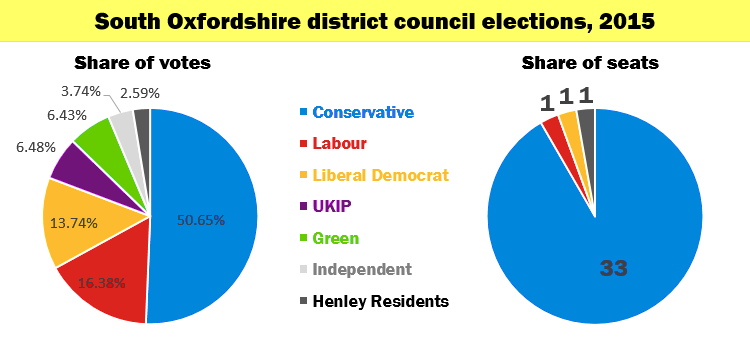
Pie charts showing share of total votes (left) and number of seats won (right)

In 2011 there was one UK Independence Party candidate, who contested a ward in Didcot. He won 5.09% of the votes in that ward. In 2015 there were 13 UKIP candidates in eight wards. They won an average of 10.91% of votes in the wards that they contested, and 6.48% of the total votes cast in the district, but no seats.

In 2011 there were Green Party candidates in four of the district's 29 wards. They won an average of 16.64% of votes in the wards that they contested, and 3.43% of total votes cast in South Oxfordshire District. In 2015 there were Green Party candidates in 13 of the district's 21 new wards, including three Green candidates in the one new Henley ward. They won an average of 10.21% of votes in the wards that they contested, and 6.43% of total votes cast in the district, but no seats.

The 2015 election increased the Conservative Party majority on the district council from 18 to 30. Opposition was reduced from 15 in 2011 to three in 2015.

== Ward results ==
=== Benson and Crowmarsh ===
Benson and Crowmarsh 2015
Party	Candidate	Votes	%	±%
Conservative	Felix Bloomfield	2,247	29.22	
Conservative	Richard Pullen	1,770	23.01	
Liberal Democrats	Sue Cooper	1,457	18.94	
Liberal Democrats	George Francis Daniel Levy	618	8.04	
Green	Andrea Jane Powell	606	7.88	
Labour	Jim Merritt	513	6.67	
Labour	Adam Wood	480	6.24	
Turnout				
Majority		313		
Conservative win (new seat)				

=== Berinsfield ===
Berinsfield 2015
Party	Candidate	Votes	%	±%
Conservative	John Cotton	968	51.38	
Labour	Maggie Winters	400	21.23	
Green	Mark Stevenson	370	19.64	
Liberal Democrats	Jane Mary Jackson	146	7.75	
Turnout				
Majority		568		
Conservative win (new seat)				

=== Chalgrove ===
Chalgrove 2015
Party	Candidate	Votes	%	±%
Liberal Democrats	David Graham Turner	1,060	54.03	
Conservative	Ann Pritchard	769	39.19	
Labour	Simon Stone	133	6.78	
Turnout				
Majority		291		
Liberal Democrats win (new seat)				

=== Chinnor ===
Chinnor 2015
Party	Candidate	Votes	%	±%
Conservative	Lynn Lloyd	3,163	39.81	
Conservative	Ian White	2,789	34.66	
Liberal Democrats	Liz Barker	827	10.28	
Labour	John Henry Cooper	702	8.72	
Liberal Democrats	Pete Barker	565	7.02	
Turnout				
Majority		1,962		
Conservative win (new seat)				

=== Cholsey ===
Cholsey 2015
Party	Candidate	Votes	%	±%
Conservative	Pat Dawe	2,151	24.35	
Conservative	Jane Murphy	1,746	19.77	
Independent	Mark Stuart Gray	1,323	14.98	
Liberal Democrats	Adrian Lee Cull	810	9.17	
Labour	Ginnie Herbert	683	7.73	
Green	Sam Casey-Rerhaye	567	6.42	
UKIP	Steve Beatty	559	6.33	
Labour	Barbara Tompsett	539	6.10	
UKIP	Bob Nielsen	455	5.15	
Turnout				
Majority		423		
Conservative win (new seat)				

=== Didcot North East ===
Didcot North East 2015
Party	Candidate	Votes	%	±%
Conservative	Tony Harbour	1,723	14.77	
Conservative	Steve Connel	1,643	14.08	
Conservative	Bill Service	1,591	13.64	
Independent	Neville Frank Harris	1,441	12.35	
Labour	Nick Hards	1,027	8.80	
Labour	Alison Joy Lane	918	7.87	
Labour	James Joseph Reeve	699	5.99	
Liberal Democrats	Les Hopper	656	5.62	
UKIP	Laura Jade Bayliss	628	5.38	
UKIP	Toby Gordon Pilling	496	4.25	
Liberal Democrats	Tony Worgan	474	4.06	
UKIP	David Sidney Weaver	370	3.17	
Turnout				
Majority		150		
Conservative win (new seat)				

=== Didcot South ===
Didcot South 2015
Party	Candidate	Votes	%	±%
Conservative	Anthony Dearlove	1,498	12.87	
Conservative	Anthony Nash	1,480	12.72	
Labour	Margaret L Davies	1,436	12.34	
Conservative	Charlie Robertson	1,371	11.78	
Labour	Eleanor Hards	1,309	12.34	
Labour	Bernard Douglas Cooper	1,295	12.34	
UKIP	Peter Ernest Elliot	937	8.05	
UKIP	Waine Anthony Wilkins	836	7.18	
Liberal Democrats	David Rouane	756	6.50	
Liberal Democrats	James Robert Loder	720	6.19	
Turnout				
Majority		65		

=== Didcot West ===
Didcot West 2015
Party	Candidate	Votes	%	±%
Conservative	Alan Thompson	1,390	24.75	
Conservative	Margaret Turner	1,299	23.13	
Labour	Denise Ann Macdonald	941	16.75	
Labour	Pamela Ann Siggers	823	14.65	
UKIP	David Roberts	604	10.75	
Liberal Democrats	Andrew Peter Jones	560	9.97	
Turnout				
Majority		358		
Conservative win (new seat)				

=== Forest Hill and Holton ===
Forest Hill and Holton 2015
Party	Candidate	Votes	%	±%
Conservative	John Walsh	902	44.00	
Liberal Democrats	Anne Purse	793	38.68	
Labour	Paddy Bullard	355	17.32	
Turnout				
Majority		109		
Conservative win (new seat)				

=== Garsington and Horspath ===
Garsington and Horspath 2015
Party	Candidate	Votes	%	±%
Conservative	Elizabeth Gillespie	1,212	58.98	
Labour	Jacob Robert Chapman	433	21.07	
Green	Robin Francis Bennett	226	11.00	
Liberal Democrats	David Stanley Mancey	184	8.95	
Turnout				
Majority		779		
Conservative win (new seat)				

=== Goring ===
Goring 2015
Party	Candidate	Votes	%	±%
Conservative	Kevin Bulmer	1,264	56.73	
Liberal Democrats	Caroline Shirley Wardle	403	18.09	
Labour	Fran Wright	316	14.18	
Green	James Welch Norman	245	11.00	
Turnout				
Majority		861		
Conservative win (new seat)				

=== Haseley Brook ===
Haseley Brook 2015
Party	Candidate	Votes	%	±%
Conservative	Stephen Harrod	1,537	66.80	
Liberal Democrats	Sarah Elizabeth Gray	386		
Labour	Emma Lara Maclean	378	16.43	
Turnout				
Majority		1,151		
Conservative win (new seat)				

=== Henley-on-Thames ===
Henley-on-Thames 2015
Party	Candidate	Votes	%	±%
Conservative	Lorraine Hillier	2,445	14.82	
Conservative	Joan Bland	2,234	13.54	
Henley Residents	Stefan John Gawrysiak	2,139	12.97	
Conservative	William Arthur Henry Hall	2,050	12.43	
Henley Residents	Simon Charles Narracott	1,231	7.46	
Independent	Elizabeth Hodgkin	1,175	7.12	
UKIP	Ken Arlett	939	5.69	
Independent	Jeni Wood	730	4.42	
Green	Elisabeth Marjorie Geake	671	4.07	
Green	Ian Petrie	595	3.61	
Liberal Democrats	Neill James Robert Hendry	502	3.04	
Labour	Cornelius Kavanagh	499	3.02	
UKIP	Chris Jones	467	2.83	
Liberal Democrats	David John Thomas	451	2.73	
Green	Richard Michael Rule	370	2.24	
Turnout				
Majority		89		

=== Kidmore End and Whitchurch ===
Kidmore End and Whitchurch 2015
Party	Candidate	Votes	%	±%
Conservative	Rob Simister	1,073	48.60	
Green	Peter Dragonetti	551	24.95	
Labour	Amanda Holland	205	9.28	
Independent	Keith John Brooks	194	8.79	
Liberal Democrats	Harry Butterworth	185	8.38	
Turnout				
Majority		868		
Conservative win (new seat)				

=== Sandford and the Wittenhams ===
Sandford and the Wittenhams 2015
Party	Candidate	Votes	%	±%
Conservative	Jon Woodley-Shead	1,030	47.14	
Liberal Democrats	Simon Geoffrey Davenport Thompson	445	20.37	
Labour	Will Atkinson	367	16.80	
Green	David John Scott	343	15.70	
Turnout				
Majority		585		
Conservative win (new seat)				

=== Sonning Common ===
Sonning Common 2015
Party	Candidate	Votes	%	±%
Conservative	Paul Harrison	2,444	32.98	
Conservative	Martin Akehurst	2,432	32.82	
Labour	David George Winchester	651	8.78	
Green	Alison Jean Smart	519	7.00	
Labour	Chris Wright	510	6.88	
Liberal Democrats	Andy Davies	431	5.82	
Liberal Democrats	Jill Elizabeth Davies	424	5.72	
Turnout				
Majority		585		
Conservative win (new seat)				

=== Thame ===
Thame 2015
Party	Candidate	Votes	%	±%
Conservative	David Dodds	3,041	18.37	
Conservative	Nigel Champken-Woods	2,704	16.34	
Conservative	Jeanette Matelot Green	2,487	15.03	
Labour	Mary Honora Stiles	1,595	9.64	
Liberal Democrats	David William Bretherton	1,466	8.86	
Liberal Democrats	Susan Bennett	1,184	7.15	
UKIP	Peter William Butler	1,129	6.82	
Labour	Tristram Maclean	1,107	6.69	
Green	Robert Guy Hughes	923	5.58	
Liberal Democrats	David Arthur Laver	915	5.53	
Turnout				
Majority		892		
Conservative win (new seat)				

=== Wallingford ===
Wallingford 2015
Party	Candidate	Votes	%	±%
Conservative	Imran Lokhon	1,639	24.30	
Conservative	Elaine Hornsby	1,608	23.84	
Green	Sue Roberts	1,135	16.83	
Labour	Liz Neighbour	879	13.03	
Labour	George William Kneeshaw	745	11.05	
UKIP	Lee Mark Upcraft	739	10.96	
Turnout				
Majority		473		
Conservative win (new seat)				

=== Watlington ===
Watlington 2015
Party	Candidate	Votes	%	±%
Conservative	Anna Badcock	1,462	65.97	
Green	Tom Bindoff	352	15.88	
Labour	Tony Winters	216	9.75	
Liberal Democrats	Catherine Mary Hughes	186	8.39	
Turnout				
Majority		1,110		
Conservative win (new seat)				

=== Wheatley ===
Wheatley 2015
Party	Candidate	Votes	%	±%
Conservative	Toby Newman	1,003	45.82	
Labour	Andrew John Walkey	508	23.21	
Liberal Democrats	Roger Thomas Bell	414	18.91	
UKIP	Alex Ashmore	264	12.06	
Turnout				
Majority		595		
Conservative win (new seat)				

=== Woodcote and Rotherfield ===
Woodcote and Rotherfield 2015
Party	Candidate	Votes	%	±%
Conservative	Charles Bailey	2,986	37.02	
Conservative	David Nimmo-Smith	2,710	33.60	
Green	Andrew James Wallis	888	11.01	
Liberal Democrats	James David Cooper	847	10.50	
Labour	Veronica Treacher	634	7.86	
Turnout				
Majority		1,822		
Conservative win (new seat)				
