= 2019 South Oxfordshire District Council election =

2019 UK local government election

← 2015	2 May 2019	2023 →

All 36 seats to South Oxfordshire District Council 19 seats needed for a majority

	First party	Second party	Third party
Party	Liberal Democrats	Conservative	Green
Last election	1 seat, 13.7%	33 seats, 50.7%	0 seats, 6.4%
Seats before	1	33	0
Seats won	12	10	5
Seat change	▲11	▼23	▲5
Popular vote	12,802	13,480	6,347
Percentage	27.8%	29.3%	13.8%
Swing	▲12.3%	▼15.2%	▲4.6%
	Fourth party	Fifth party	Sixth party
Party	Independent	Labour	Henley Residents
Last election	0 seats, 3.7%	1 seat, 16.4%	1 seat, 2.6%
Seats before	0	1	1
Seats won	3	3	3
Seat change	▲3	▲2	▲2
Popular vote	5,655	4,769	2,239
Percentage	12.3%	10.4%	4.9%
Swing	▲7.2%	▼5.5%	▲2.3%
- Winner in each seat at the 2019 South OXfordshire District Council election

The 2019 South Oxfordshire District Council election took place on 2 May 2019 to elect members of South Oxfordshire District Council in Oxfordshire, England. The whole council was up for election. The Conservatives lost control of the council.

== Summary ==
=== Election result ===
2019 South Oxfordshire District Council election
Party	Candidates	Seats	Gains	Losses	Net gain/loss	Seats %	Votes %	Votes	+/−
Liberal Democrats	23	12	11	0	▲11	33.3	27.8	12,802	+12.3
Conservative	36	10	0	23	▼23	27.8	29.3	13,480	–15.2
Green	9	5	5	0	▲5	13.9	13.8	6,347	+4.6
Independent	6	3	3	0	▲3	8.3	12.3	5,655	+7.2
Labour	22	3	2	0	▲2	8.3	10.4	4,769	–5.5
Henley Residents	3	3	2	0	▲2	8.3	4.9	2,239	+2.3
UKIP	4	0	0	0	Steady	0.0	1.5	686	–5.7

== Results by ward ==
=== Benson & Crowmarsh ===
Benson & Crowmarsh
Party	Candidate	Votes	%	±%
Liberal Democrats	Sue Cooper	1,472	58.1	
Green	Andrea Powell	1,300	51.3	
Conservative	Felix Bloomfield	837	33.1	
Conservative	Natasha Harrington	791	31.2	
UKIP	Steve Beatty	203	8.0	N/A
Turnout		2,542	43.27%	
Liberal Democrats gain from Conservative		Swing		
Green gain from Conservative		Swing		

=== Berinsfield ===
Berinsfield
Party	Candidate	Votes	%	±%
Green	Robin Bennett	651	59.2	+39.6
Conservative	Stuart Scott-Ely	251	22.8	−28.6
UKIP	Lorenzo de Gregori	118	10.7	N/A
Labour	Jim Merritt	79	7.2	−14.0
Turnout		1,102	36.99%	
Green gain from Conservative		Swing		

=== Chalgrove ===
Chalgrove
Party	Candidate	Votes	%	±%
Liberal Democrats	David Turner	993	87.1	+33.1
Conservative	Louise Heathcote	147	12.9	−26.3
Turnout		1,146	43.18%	
Liberal Democrats hold		Swing		

=== Chinnor ===
Chinnor
Party	Candidate	Votes	%	±%
Conservative	Lynn Lloyd	960	47.7	
Conservative	Ian White	884	43.9	
Liberal Democrats	Liz Barker	681	33.8	
Independent	Gordon Archer	656	32.6	N/A
Liberal Democrats	David Laver	482	23.9	
Turnout		2,032	30.93%	
Conservative hold		Swing		
Conservative hold		Swing		

=== Cholsey ===
Cholsey
Party	Candidate	Votes	%	±%
Conservative	Jane Murphy	1,158	45.2	
Liberal Democrats	Anne-Marie Simpson	1,085	42.4	
Conservative	Paul Ramsay	943	36.8	
Labour	Ginnie Herbert	663	25.9	
Labour	Solveig Bang	573	22.4	
Turnout		2,600	38.81%	
Conservative hold		Swing		
Liberal Democrats gain from Conservative		Swing		

=== Didcot North East ===
Didcot North East
Party	Candidate	Votes	%	±%
Independent	Simon Hewerdine	1,248	49.9	N/A
Liberal Democrats	Victoria Haval	799	32.0	
Liberal Democrats	David Rouane	646	25.8	
Liberal Democrats	Paul Giesberg	638	25.5	N/A
Conservative	Bill Service	599	24.0	
Conservative	Roger Hawlor	554	22.2	
Conservative	Adam Binks	526	21.0	
Labour	Nick Hards	523	20.9	
Labour	John Ord	377	15.1	
Labour	Joseph Jones-Jennings	346	13.8	
Turnout		2,518	35.09%	
Independent gain from Conservative		Swing		
Liberal Democrats gain from Conservative		Swing		
Liberal Democrats gain from Conservative		Swing		

=== Didcot South ===
Didcot South
Party	Candidate	Votes	%	±%
Labour	Mocky Khan	842	37.3	
Labour	Celia Wilson	732	32.5	
Labour	Axel MacDonald	709	31.4	
Green	Malcolm Smith	695	30.8	N/A
Conservative	Jackie Billington	681	30.2	
Liberal Democrats	Jim Loder	644	28.6	
Liberal Democrats	Paul Turnpenny	635	28.2	
Conservative	Anthony Dearlove	625	27.7	
Conservative	Annah Francis	538	23.9	
Turnout		2,322	27.96%	
Labour gain from Conservative		Swing		
Labour gain from Conservative		Swing		
Labour hold		Swing		

=== Didcot West ===
Didcot West
Party	Candidate	Votes	%	±%
Conservative	Ian Snowdon	660	40.7	
Conservative	Alan Thompson	540	33.3	
Labour	Denise MacDonald	511	31.5	
Green	Adam Grindey	451	27.8	N/A
Liberal Democrats	Andrew Jones	431	26.6	
Labour	Pam Siggers	426	26.3	
Turnout		1,638	28.98%	
Conservative hold		Swing		
Conservative hold		Swing		

=== Forest Hill & Holton ===
Forest Hill & Holton
Party	Candidate	Votes	%	±%
Liberal Democrats	Sarah Gray	613	56.2	+17.5
Conservative	John Walsh	371	34.0	−10.0
Labour	Thomas Goss	106	9.7	−7.6
Turnout		1,115	41.42%	
Liberal Democrats gain from Conservative		Swing		

=== Garsington & Horspath ===
Garsington & Horspath
Party	Candidate	Votes	%	±%
Conservative	Elizabeth Gillespie	483	50.0	−9.0
Liberal Democrats	Catherine Hughes	222	23.0	+14.0
Labour	Crispin Flintoff	140	14.5	−6.6
Green	Mark Stevenson	121	12.5	+1.5
Turnout		980	34.76%	
Conservative hold		Swing		

=== Goring ===
Goring
Party	Candidate	Votes	%	±%
Liberal Democrats	Maggie Filipova-Rivers	608	46.0	+27.9
Conservative	Kevin Bulmer	519	39.2	−17.5
Labour	Chris Bertrand	196	14.8	+0.6
Turnout		1,343	43.66%	
Liberal Democrats gain from Conservative		Swing		

=== Haseley Brook ===
Haseley Brook
Party	Candidate	Votes	%	±%
Conservative	Caroline Newton	555	46.8	−20.0
Liberal Democrats	Bob Massie	527	44.4	+27.6
UKIP	Greg Hitchcox	105	8.8	N/A
Turnout		1,201	38.59%	
Conservative hold		Swing		

=== Henley-on-Thames ===
Henley-on-Thames
Party	Candidate	Votes	%	±%
Henley Residents	Stefan Gawrysiak	2,239	61.5	
Henley Residents	Kellie Hinton	1,976	54.3	
Henley Residents	Ken Arlett	1,943	53.4	
Conservative	Laurence Plant	1,117	30.7	
Conservative	Will Hamilton	1,021	28.1	
Conservative	Emma Levy	880	24.2	
Labour	Jackie Walker	468	12.9	
Liberal Democrats	David Thomas	460	12.6	
Turnout		3,658	40.46%	
Henley Residents gain from Conservative		Swing		
Henley Residents gain from Conservative		Swing		
Henley Residents hold		Swing		

=== Kidmore End & Whitchurch ===
Kidmore End & Whitchurch
Party	Candidate	Votes	%	±%
Independent	Peter Dragonetti	736	64.6	+39.6
Conservative	Domenic Papa	280	24.6	−24.0
Labour	Dave Bowen	122	10.7	+1.4
Turnout		1,154	40.70%	
Independent gain from Conservative		Swing		

=== Sandford & the Wittenhams ===
Sandford & the Wittenhams
Party	Candidate	Votes	%	±%
Green	Sam Casey-Rerhaye	956	73.4	+57.7
Conservative	Fiona Hardern	347	26.6	−20.5
Turnout		1,328	43.89%	
Green gain from Conservative		Swing		

=== Sonning Common ===
Sonning Common
Party	Candidate	Votes	%	±%
Independent	Leigh Rawlins	1,238	57.1	N/A
Conservative	David Bartholomew	951	43.8	
Conservative	Bruce Harrison	703	32.4	
Liberal Democrats	Lucio Fumi	540	24.9	
Labour	David Winchester	273	12.6	
Turnout		2,186	39.96%	
Independent gain from Conservative		Swing		
Conservative hold		Swing		

=== Thame ===
Thame
Party	Candidate	Votes	%	±%
Liberal Democrats	Kate Gregory	1,442	43.0	
Liberal Democrats	David Bretherton	1,425	42.4	
Liberal Democrats	Pieter-Paul Barker	1,113	33.2	
Independent	Tom Wyse	1,009	30.1	N/A
Conservative	Nigel Champken-Woods	941	28.0	
Conservative	David Dodds	926	27.6	
Conservative	Jeannette Matelot	908	27.0	
Labour	Paul Swan	484	14.4	
Labour	Joshua Lay	481	14.3	
Turnout		3,399	35.38%	
Liberal Democrats gain from Conservative		Swing		
Liberal Democrats gain from Conservative		Swing		
Liberal Democrats gain from Conservative		Swing		

=== Wallingford ===
Wallingford
Party	Candidate	Votes	%	±%
Green	Sue Roberts	1,206	51.2	
Liberal Democrats	George Levy	943	40.0	N/A
Independent	Elaine Hornsby	768	32.6	
Conservative	Harry Wilder	546	23.2	
Conservative	Adrian Lloyd	527	22.4	
Labour	George Kneeshaw	251	10.7	
Labour	Peter Williams	185	7.9	
Turnout		2,372	39.27%	
Green gain from Conservative		Swing		
Liberal Democrats gain from Conservative		Swing		

=== Watlington ===
Watlington
Party	Candidate	Votes	%	±%
Conservative	Anna Badcock	648	51.5	−14.5
Liberal Democrats	Steph van de Pette	611	48.5	+40.1
Turnout		1,275	41.97%	
Conservative hold		Swing		

=== Wheatley ===
Wheatley
Party	Candidate	Votes	%	±%
Liberal Democrats	Alexandrine Kantor	731	64.2	+45.3
Conservative	Toby Newman	297	26.1	−19.7
Labour	Susan Shaw	111	9.7	−13.5
Turnout		1,157	35.91%	
Liberal Democrats gain from Conservative		Swing		

=== Woodcote & Rotherfield ===
Woodcote & Rotherfield
Party	Candidate	Votes	%	±%
Conservative	Lorraine Hillier	1,132	49.4	
Green	Jo Robb	967	42.2	
Green	Andrew Wallis	907	39.6	
Conservative	Geoff Walsh	889	38.8	
UKIP	David Carpin	260	11.3	
Turnout		2,312	35.59%	
Conservative hold		Swing		
Green gain from Conservative		Swing		

== By-elections ==
=== Didcot North East ===
Didcot North East: 6 May 2021
Party	Candidate	Votes	%	±%
Conservative	Andrea Warren	1,113	40.7	+21.8
Liberal Democrats	Paul Giesberg	953	34.8	+9.6
Labour	Nick Hards	670	24.5	+8.0
Majority		160	5.9	
Turnout		2,736		
Conservative gain from Independent		Swing	▲6.1	

=== Forest Hill and Holton ===
Forest Hill and Holton: 6 May 2021
Party	Candidate	Votes	%	±%
Liberal Democrats	Tim Bearder	907	64.3	+8.1
Conservative	John Walsh	503	35.7	+1.7
Majority		404	28.6	
Turnout		1,410		
Liberal Democrats hold		Swing	▲3.2	
