= 2011 South Oxfordshire District Council election =

2011 UK local government election

← 2007	3 May 2011	2015 →
Party	Conservative	Liberal Democrats	Labour
Popular vote	24,253	8,807	7,567
Percentage	46.1%	16.7%	14.6%
Party	Independent	Henley Residents
Popular vote	7,523	1,849
Percentage	13.8%	3.5%
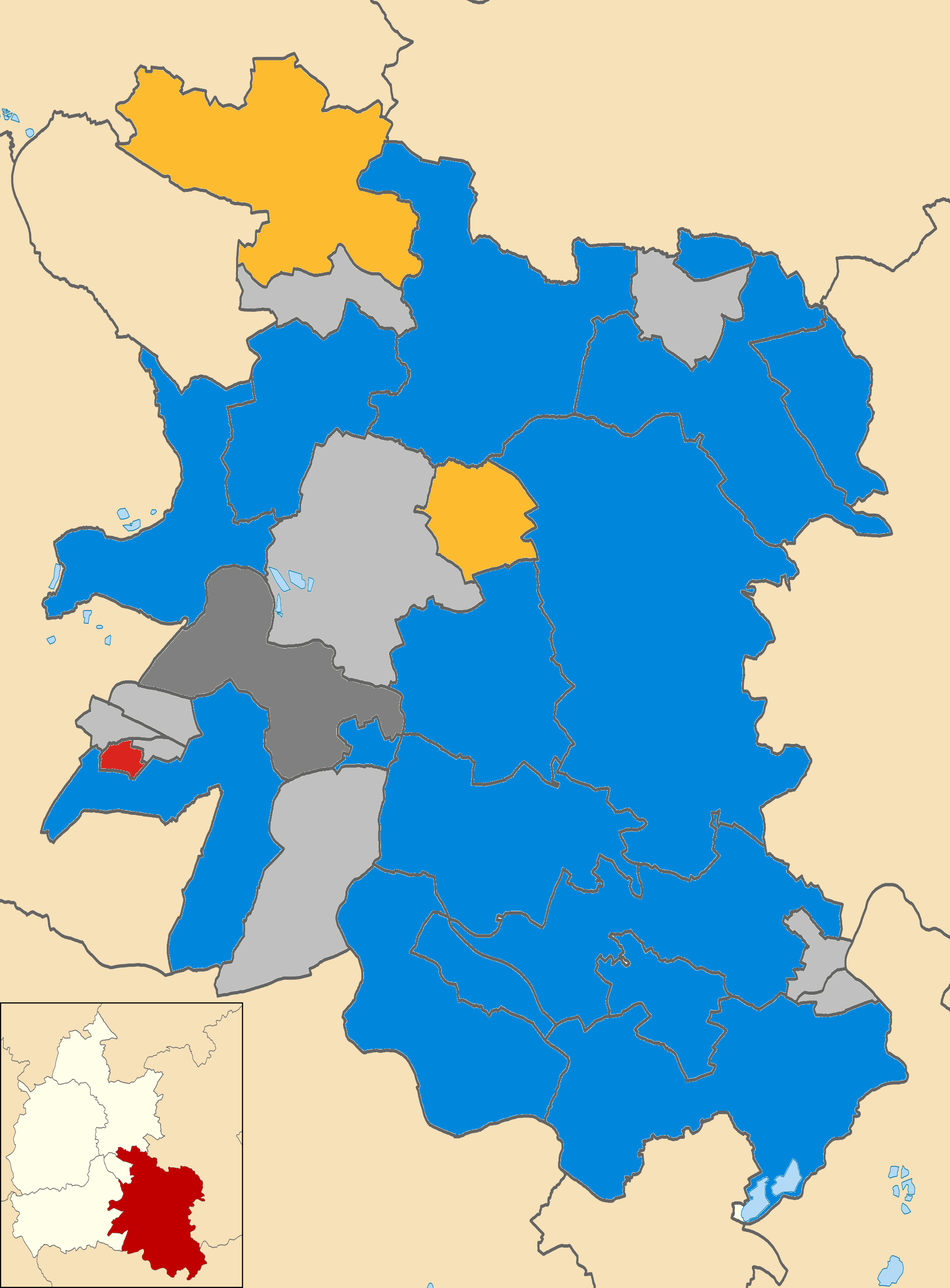
- Wards of South Oxfordshire District Council

The 2011 South Oxfordshire District Council election was held on 5 May 2011 to elect members of South Oxfordshire District Council in England. This was on the same day as other local elections.

Elections were held for all 48 seats on the council. The Conservative Party won 33 seats. The Liberal Democrats won seven seats and Henley Residents Group won two. The Labour Party won one seat and two independent candidates each won a seat. The Conservative Party kept overall control of the council, with its majority reduced to 27.

== Results ==
South Oxfordshire District Council elections result 2011
Party	Seats	Gains	Losses	Net gain/loss	Seats %	Votes %	Votes	+/−
Conservative	33	+3	-8	-5	68,75	46.1	24,253	-
Liberal Democrats	4	+1	-3	-2	8.33	16.7	8,807	-
Labour	4	3	0	+3	8.33	14.6	7,567	+
Independent	5	3	0	+3	10.42	13.8	7,253	+
Henley Residents	2	1	0	+1	4.17	3.5	1,849	+
Green	0	0	0	0	0.00	4.8	2,522	
UKIP	0	0	0	0	0.00	0.5	242	

The Conservative Party's share of votes fell from 50.9% in the 2007 South Oxfordshire District Council election to 46.1% in 2011. In 2011 Conservative candidates won three seats from Liberal Democrats. However, Conservative candidates also lost three seats to independent candidates, three to Labour, one to the Henley Residents Group and one to a Liberal Democrat. The Conservatives had won 38 seats in 2007 but were reduced to 33 in 2011. However, this was still almost 69% of the 48 seats on the council, and gave the Conservative group an overall majority of 15.

The Liberal Democrats' share of votes fell from 28.6% in 2007 to 16.7% in 2011. The net result of their gaining seats from and losing seats to the Conservatives reduced their number of members on the council to four. However, the Liberal Democrats retained the second largest share of total votes in the district.

The Labour Party increased its share of votes from 7.3% in 2007 to 14.6% in 2011. Gaining three seats from the Conservatives increasing its number of members on the council to four.

In 2007 two independent candidates were elected to the district council. In 2011 both of these independent councillors were re-elected and three gained seats from Conservatives, increasing the number of independent councillors to five.

In 2007 one Henley Residents Group councillor was elected. In 2011 HRG held that seat and won a second, increasing its number of members on the council to two. HRG won an average of 37.2% of votes in the two wards that it contested.

In 2007 there were Green Party candidates in eight of the district's 29 wards. In 2011 there were only four Green Party candidates in four wards. They won an average of 16.64% of votes in the wards that they contested, and 3.43% of total votes cast in South Oxfordshire District, but no seats.

There was one UK Independence Party candidate, who contested a ward in Didcot. He won 8.6% of the votes in that ward, and was not elected.

== Ward results ==
=== Aston Rowant ===
Aston Rowant 2011
Party	Candidate	Votes	%	±%
Conservative	Dorothy Brown	793	78.2	
Liberal Democrats	David Stanley Mancey	221	21.8	
Turnout				
Majority		572		
Conservative hold		Swing		

=== Benson ===
Benson 2011
Party	Candidate	Votes	%	±%
Conservative	Felix Bloomfield	1,053		
Conservative	Rachel Elizabeth Ruth Wallis	857		
Liberal Democrats	Sue Cooper	795		
Liberal Democrats	George Francis Daniel Levy	336		
Green	Andrea Jane Powell	275		
Labour	Adam Wood	266		
Turnout				
Majority		62		

=== Berinsfield ===
Berinsfield 2011
Party	Candidate	Votes	%	±%
Conservative	Phil Cross	954		
Independent	Marc Geoffrey Hiles	790		
Conservative	Richard James Huntley	786		
Green	Mark Christopher Stevenson	729		
Turnout				
Majority		4		

=== Brightwell ===
Brightwell 2011
Party	Candidate	Votes	%	±%
Independent	Celia Jane Collett	681	64.1	
Conservative	Mark Hanson	300	28.2	
Labour	Liz Neighbour	81	7.6	
Turnout				
Majority		381		
Independent hold		Swing		

=== Chalgrove ===
Chalgrove 2011
Party	Candidate	Votes	%	±%
Liberal Democrats	David Graham Turner	729	61.6	
Conservative	Carol Fowler	375	31.7	
Labour	Paul David Collins	80	6.8	
Turnout				
Majority		354		
Liberal Democrats hold		Swing		

=== Chiltern Woods ===
Chiltern Woods 2011
Party	Candidate	Votes	%	±%
Conservative	Judith Mary Nimmo-Smith	715	73.9	
Liberal Democrats	Andrew Stephen Davies	141	14.6	
Labour	Veronica Treacher	112	11.6	
Turnout				
Majority		574		
Conservative hold		Swing		

=== Chinnor ===
Chinnor 2011
Party	Candidate	Votes	%	±%
Conservative	Christopher Allen Hood	1,054		
Conservative	Geoff Andrews	1,026		
Independent	Pat Haywood	740		
Independent	Martin George Wright	737		
Labour	Simon Stone	327		
Turnout				
Majority		286		
Conservative hold		Swing		

=== Cholsey and Wallingford South ===
Cholsey and Wallingford South 2011
Party	Candidate	Votes	%	±%
Independent	Mark Stuart Gray	1,229		
Conservative	Pat Dawe	883		
Conservative	Felicity Ann Aska	838		
Labour	Mandy Winters	459		
Labour	John Charles Moody	229		
Turnout				
Majority		391		
Conservative hold		Swing		

=== Crowmarsh ===
Crowmarsh 2011
Party	Candidate	Votes	%	±%
Conservative	Kristina Elizabeth Crabbe	510	55.4	
Liberal Democrats	John Howard Griffin	403	44.6	
Turnout				
Majority		98		
Conservative hold		Swing		

=== Didcot All Saints ===
Didcot All Saints 2011
Party	Candidate	Votes	%	±%
Labour	Terry Joslin	647		
Conservative	Margaret Ann Turner	642		
Conservative	Jane Murphy	635		
Labour	Nick Hards	597		
Liberal Democrats	Andrew Peter Jones	226		
Liberal Democrats	James Robert Loder	185		
Turnout				
Majority		45		

=== Didcot Ladygrove ===
Didcot Ladygrove 2011
Party	Candidate	Votes	%	±%
Conservative	Tony Richard John Harbour	1,106		
Conservative	Bill Service	1,060		
Independent	Neville Frank Harris	948		
Conservative	Roger Mark Hawlor	903		
Labour	Bill Atkinson	529		
Labour	Nicola Jane Williams	506		
Labour	Robert Allen Bulman	408		
UKIP	Paul John Williams	242		
Turnout				
Majority		45		

=== Didcot Northbourne ===
Didcot Northbourne 2011
Party	Candidate	Votes	%	±%
Labour	Bernard Douglas Cooper	504		
Conservative	Steve Connell	458		
Labour	Scott Robert Wilgrove	442		
Liberal Democrats	David Rouane	429		
Conservative	Phil Hayward	428		
Independent	Sue Such	348		
Turnout				
Majority		16		

=== Didcot Park ===
Didcot Park 2011
Party	Candidate	Votes	%	±%
Labour	Margaret Lesley Davies	769		
Labour	Eleanor Hards	730		
Conservative	Christopher Edwin Harrison	668		
Conservative	Alan Roy Thompson	640		
Liberal Democrats	Jen Parry	253		
Liberal Democrats	Tony Worgan	180		
Turnout				
Majority		62		
Labour hold		Swing		

=== Forest Hill and Holton ===
Forest Hill and Holton 2011
Party	Candidate	Votes	%	±%
Liberal Democrats	Anne Purse	621	61.5	
Conservative	Ginette Camps-Walsh	389	38.5	
Turnout				
Majority		232		
Liberal Democrats hold		Swing		

=== Garsington ===
Garsington 2011
Party	Candidate	Votes	%	±%
Conservative	Elizabeth Gillespie	639	65.9	
Liberal Democrats	Jane Jackson	331	34.1	
Turnout				
Majority		308		
Conservative hold		Swing		

=== Goring ===
Goring 2011
Party	Candidate	Votes	%	±%
Conservative	Ann Ducker	1,447		
Conservative	Pearl Slatter	1,199		
Green	Peter Hugh Dragonetti	866		
Liberal Democrats	Caroline Shirley Wardle	551		
Labour	Fran Barefield	394		
Turnout				
Majority		333		
Conservative hold		Swing		

=== Great Milton ===
Great Milton 2011
Party	Candidate	Votes	%	±%
Conservative	Stephen Harrod	641	60.3	
Liberal Democrats	Wendy Court	422	39.7	
Turnout				
Majority		219		
Conservative gain from Liberal Democrats				

=== Hagbourne ===
Hagbourne 2011
Party	Candidate	Votes	%	±%
Conservative	Leo Docherty	831	73.7	
Labour	Alison Lane	296	26.3	
Turnout				
Majority		535		
Conservative hold		Swing		

=== Henley North ===
Henley North 2011
Party	Candidate	Votes	%	±%
Henley Residents	Elizabeth Hodgkin	923		
Conservative	Joan Bland	801		
Conservative	Lorraine Hillier	789		
Henley Residents	Martin Sydney Akehurst	696		
Liberal Democrats	Julian Philip Allison	139		
Liberal Democrats	Neill James Robert Hendry	123		
Labour	Paul Holland	116		
Turnout				
Majority		93		

=== Henley South ===
Henley South 2011
Party	Candidate	Votes	%	±%
Henley Residents	Jennifer Wood	926		
Conservative	William Arthur Henry Hall	723		
Independent	Ken Arlett	710		
Conservative	David Michael Silvester	670		
Liberal Democrats	Asbjorg Dunker	274		
Liberal Democrats	Barry George Wood	253		
Labour	Margaret Goodwin	208		
Turnout				
Majority		13		

=== Sandford ===
Sandford 2011
Party	Candidate	Votes	%	±%
Conservative	John Anthony Cotton	424	47.7	
Independent	John Ernest Stimson	248	27.9	
Labour	Will Atkinson	216	24.3	
Turnout				
Majority		176		
Conservative hold		Swing		

=== Shiplake ===
Shiplake 2011
Party	Candidate	Votes	%	±%
Conservative	Malcolm Leonard	1,371		
Conservative	Rob Simister	1,176		
Liberal Democrats	Peter Wardle	345		
Labour	Janet Matthews	321		
Turnout				
Majority		2,202		
Conservative hold		Swing		

=== Sonning Common ===
Sonning Common 2011
Party	Candidate	Votes	%	±%
Conservative	Paul Harrison	1,461		
Conservative	Alan Geoffrey Rooke	1,259		
Green	Aidan Lawrence Carlisle	652		
Labour	David Winchester	486		
Turnout				
Majority		607		
Conservative hold		Swing		

=== Thame North ===
Thame North 2011
Party	Candidate	Votes	%	±%
Conservative	Mike Welply	1,075		
Liberal Democrats	David William Bretherton	898		
Liberal Democrats	Jeanette Ann Matelot Green	800		
Turnout				
Majority		277		

=== Thame South ===
Thame South 2011
Party	Candidate	Votes	%	±%
Conservative	David William Dodds	1,065		
Independent	Ann Midwinter	916		
Labour	Mary Honora Stiles	892		
Liberal Democrats	David Arthur Laver	422		
Liberal Democrats	Pete Barker	313		
Turnout				
Majority		24		

=== Wallingford North ===
Wallingford North 2011
Party	Candidate	Votes	%	±%
Conservative	Marcus David Harris	854		
Conservative	Imran Lokhon	810		
Independent	Charles Brinley Ledlie	643		
Labour	George William Kneeshaw	493		
Labour	Graham Ruecroft	406		
Turnout				
Majority		167		
Conservative hold		Swing		

=== Watlington ===
Watlington 2011
Party	Candidate	Votes	%	±%
Conservative	Anna Fairbairn Badcock	1,351		
Conservative	Angie Paterson	1,328		
Liberal Democrats	Nick Hancock	536		
Labour	James Herbert Merritt	366		
Turnout				
Majority		792		
Conservative hold		Swing		

=== Wheatley ===
Wheatley 2011
Party	Candidate	Votes	%	±%
Conservative	Janet Maureen Carr	976		
Liberal Democrats	Roger Thomas Bell	786		
Conservative	John Patrick Walsh	724		
Liberal Democrats	Helena Tess Harris	694		
Turnout				
Majority		42		

=== Woodcote ===
Woodcote 2011
Party	Candidate	Votes	%	±%
Conservative	Christopher John Quinton	703	63.8	
Liberal Democrats	Robin Heys Pierce	304	27.6	
Labour	Amanda Holland	95	8.6	
Turnout				
Majority		399		
Conservative gain from Liberal Democrats				
