= 2013 Oxfordshire County Council election =

2013 UK local government election

← 2009	2 May 2013	2017 →

All 63 seats to Oxfordshire County Council 32 seats needed for a majority
- Turnout: 30.4%
	First party	Second party	Third party
Party	Conservative	Labour	Liberal Democrats
Seats won	31	15	11
Seat change	▼13	▲7	▲2
- Map showing the results of the 2013 Oxfordshire County Council elections.
Council control before election
Conservative
Council control after election
No Overall Control

An election to Oxfordshire County Council took place on 2 May 2013 as part of the 2013 United Kingdom local elections. 63 councillors were elected from 61 electoral divisions, which returned either one or two county councillors each by first-past-the-post voting for a four-year term of office. Following a boundary review, the electoral divisions were not the same as those used at the previous election in 2009. The election saw the Conservative Party lose overall control of the council as the party found itself one seat short of an overall majority.

All locally registered electors (British, Irish, Commonwealth and European Union citizens) who were aged 18 or over on Thursday 2 May 2013 were entitled to vote in the local elections. Those who were temporarily away from their ordinary address (for example, away working, on holiday, in student accommodation or in hospital) were also entitled to vote in the local elections, although those who had moved abroad and registered as overseas electors cannot vote in the local elections. It is possible to register to vote at more than one address (such as a university student who had a term-time address and lives at home during holidays) at the discretion of the local Electoral Register Office, but it remains an offence to vote more than once in the same local government election.

== Ward boundary review ==
In 2012 the Local Government Boundary Commission for England recommended a number of ward boundary changes, creating a number of new wards and combining others, to improve the electoral equality across the county. As a result, the number of wards increased from 58 to 61, while the number of councillors reduced from 74 to 63. All except two of the wards would now be single member divisions.

== Results ==
Oxfordshire County Council election, 2013
Party	Seats	Gains	Losses	Net gain/loss	Seats %	Votes %	Votes	+/−
Conservative	31	0	13	-13	49.2	34.5	53,708	
Labour	15	7	0	+7	23.8	21.3	33,162	
Liberal Democrats	11	4	2	+2	17.5	15.9	24,721	
Independent	4	3	0	+3	6.4	3.0	4,620	
Green	2	1	0	+1	3.2	9.0	13,990	
UKIP	0	0	0	0	0.0	15.9	24,802	
Henley Residents	0	0	0	0	0.0	0.5	789	
Monster Raving Loony	0	0	0	0	0.0	0.02	38	

== Aftermath ==
The Conservatives lost the overall majority that they had held on the council for eight years. They were however able to continue to govern in a minority administration with the support of three of the four independent councillors – Lynda Atkins, Mark Gray and Les Sibley.

The support of these three independent councillors gave the Conservatives an overall majority of 34 out of 63 seats.

== Division results ==
=== Abingdon East ===
Abingdon East
Party	Candidate	Votes	%	±%
Liberal Democrats	Alison Rooke	1,280	47	
Conservative	Mike Badcock	724	26	
UKIP	Nikolai Tolstoy	322	12	
Labour	Mike Gould	238	9	
Green	Julius Bullock	172	6	
Turnout		2,736	35	
Liberal Democrats gain from Conservative		Swing		

=== Abingdon North ===
Abingdon North
Party	Candidate	Votes	%	±%
Conservative	Sandy Lovatt	1,165	39	
Liberal Democrats	Helen Pighills	949	31	
UKIP	Tom Fleming	430	14	
Labour	George Ryall	255	8	
Green	Chris Caddy	221	7	
Turnout		3,020	41	
Conservative win (new seat)				

=== Abingdon South ===
Abingdon South
Party	Candidate	Votes	%	±%
Liberal Democrats	Neil Fawcett	1,099	37	
Conservative	Marilyn Diana Badcock	847	28	
Labour	Chewe Edgar Munkonge	501	17	
UKIP	David Weaver	389	13	
Green	Carolyn Guillot	156	5	
Turnout		2,992	43	
Liberal Democrats win (new seat)				

=== Banbury Calthorpe ===
Banbury Calthorpe
Party	Candidate	Votes	%	±%
Labour	Mark Cherry	576	32	
Conservative	Keith Strangwood	560	31	
UKIP	Gordon Watt	491	27	
Green	David Chanter	91	5	
Liberal Democrats	Janice Johnson	80	4	
Turnout		1,798	29	
Labour win (new seat)				

=== Banbury Grimsbury & Castle ===
Banbury Grimsbury & Castle
Party	Candidate	Votes	%	±%
Labour	Mike Beal	853	43	
Conservative	Ann Bonner	634	32	
UKIP	Linda Wren	345	17	
Green	John Haywood	86	4	
Liberal Democrats	Kenneth Ashworth	56	3	
Turnout		1,974	24	
Labour win (new seat)				

=== Banbury Hardwick ===
Banbury Hardwick
Party	Candidate	Votes	%	±%
Labour Co-op	Surinder Dhesi	700	35	
Conservative	Nicholas Turner	586	29	
UKIP	John Brown	561	28	
Liberal Democrats	Anthony Burns	85	4	
Green	Robert Paynter	77	4	
Turnout		2,009	23	
Labour Co-op win (new seat)				

=== Banbury Ruscote ===
Banbury Ruscote
Party	Candidate	Votes	%	±%
Labour	John Christie	787	44	
Conservative	Alyas Ahmed	477	27	
UKIP	David Burton	428	24	
Green	Christopher Manley	95	5	
Turnout		1,787	23	
Labour win (new seat)				

=== Barton, Sandhills & Risinghurst ===
Barton, Sandhills & Risinghurst
Party	Candidate	Votes	%	±%
Labour	Glynis Phillips	864	51	
UKIP	Ian Macdonald	309	18	
Liberal Democrats	Jennie Howard	197	12	
Conservative	Thomas Kelley	193	11	
Green	Mary-Jane Sareva	128	8	
Turnout		1,691	24	
Labour win (new seat)				

=== Benson & Cholsey ===
Benson & Cholsey
Party	Candidate	Votes	%	±%
Independent	Mark Gray	1,194	46	
Conservative	Peter Skolar	545	21	
UKIP	Robert Nielsen	513	20	
Green	Tim Fenn	166	6	
Labour	Mandy Winters	154	6	
Turnout		2,572	37	
Independent win (new seat)				

=== Berinsfield & Garsington ===
Berinsfield & Garsington
Party	Candidate	Votes	%	±%
Conservative	Lorraine Lindsay-Gale	1,151	47	
UKIP	Sam Launder	517	21	
Labour	Jim Merritt	354	15	
Green	Mark Stevenson	266	11	
Liberal Democrats	Jane Jackson	143	6	
Turnout		2,431	36	
Conservative win (new seat)				

=== Bicester North ===
Bicester North
Party	Candidate	Votes	%	±%
Conservative	Lawrie Stratford	599	39	
UKIP	Barbara Fairweather	402	26	
Labour	Steve Uttley	262	17	
Independent	Tony Walton	131	9	
Liberal Democrats	Steve Creed	85	6	
Green	Mohammad Tariq	47	3	
Turnout		1,526	22	
Conservative win (new seat)				

=== Bicester Town ===
Bicester Town
Party	Candidate	Votes	%	±%
Conservative	Michael Waine	983	49	
Labour	Polly Foster	490	24	
UKIP	Alan Bickley	393	20	
Green	Fiona Mawson	86	4	
Liberal Democrats	Samantha Bowring	61	3	
Turnout		2,013	28	
Conservative win (new seat)				

=== Bicester West ===
Bicester West
Party	Candidate	Votes	%	±%
Independent	Les Sibley	964	52	
Conservative	Norman Bolster	364	20	
UKIP	Darren Cain	241	13	
Labour	Steve Sargeant	237	13	
Green	David Newman	38	2	
Liberal Democrats	Elizabeth Fleming	13	1	
Turnout		1,857	31	
Independent win (new seat)				

=== Bloxham & Easington ===
Bloxham & Easington
Party	Candidate	Votes	%	±%
Conservative	Kieron Mallon	1,281	54	
UKIP	Lynne Shawyer	512	21	
Labour	Mary Young	361	15	
Liberal Democrats	Graham Antrobus	120	5	
Green	Katherine Chandler	115	5	
Turnout		2,389	33	
Conservative win (new seat)				

=== Burford & Carterton North ===
Burford & Carterton North
Party	Candidate	Votes	%	±%
Conservative	Neil Owen	816	49	
UKIP	Martyn Garrett	401	24	
Liberal Democrats	Elizabeth Mortimer	180	11	
Labour	Richard Kelsall	149	9	
Green	Rosie Pearson	115	7	
Turnout		1,661	24	
Conservative win (new seat)				

=== Carterton South & West ===
Carterton South & West
Party	Candidate	Votes	%	±%
Conservative	Pete Handley	1,049	52	
UKIP	Barclay Lawrence	540	27	
Labour Co-op	Michael Enright	219	11	
Green	Alma Tumilowicz	111	6	
Liberal Democrats	Amanda Epps	90	4	
Turnout		2,009	19	
Conservative win (new seat)				

=== Chalgrove & Watlington ===
Chalgrove & Watlington
Party	Candidate	Votes	%	±%
Conservative	Caroline Newton	1,508	58	
Liberal Democrats	Nicholas Hancock	465	18	
Labour	Paul Collins	330	13	
Green	Sue Tibbles	310	12	
Turnout		2,613	35	
Conservative win (new seat)				

=== Charlbury & Wychwood ===
Charlbury & Wychwood
Party	Candidate	Votes	%	±%
Conservative	Rodney Rose	1,199	39	
Liberal Democrats	Liz Leffman	900	30	
UKIP	Clive Taylor	461	15	
Labour	Liz Blount	267	9	
Green	Celia Kerslake	220	7	
Turnout		3,047	31	
Conservative win (new seat)				

=== Chipping Norton ===
Chipping Norton
Party	Candidate	Votes	%	±%
Conservative	Hilary Biles	1,447	49	
Labour Co-op	Geoff Saul	911	31	
UKIP	James Stanley	383	13	
Green	Paul Creighton	132	4	
Liberal Democrats	Andrew Crick	77	3	
Turnout		2,950	29	
Conservative win (new seat)				

=== Churchill & Lye Valley ===
Churchill & Lye Valley
Party	Candidate	Votes	%	±%
Labour Co-op	Liz Brighouse	1,071	64	
Green	Julian Faultless	250	15	
Conservative	Gary Dixon	235	14	
Liberal Democrats	Nick Dewey	111	7	
Turnout		1,667	19	
Labour Co-op win (new seat)				

=== Cowley ===
Cowley
Party	Candidate	Votes	%	±%
Labour	John Sanders	1,040	55	
Conservative	Judith Harley	387	20	
Green	Hasan Miah	348	18	
Liberal Democrats	Mike Tait	114	6	
Turnout		1,889	22	
Labour win (new seat)				

=== Deddington ===
Deddington
Party	Candidate	Votes	%	±%
Conservative	Arash Fatemian	1,451	46	
UKIP	Alan Harris	576	18	
Green	Mary Franklin	456	15	
Labour	Sue Christie	442	14	
Liberal Democrats	Ian Thomas	205	7	
Turnout		3,130	35	
Conservative win (new seat)				

=== Didcot East & Hagbourne ===
Didcot East & Hagbourne
Party	Candidate	Votes	%	±%
Conservative	Patrick Greene	713	37	
Labour	Alison Lane	476	25	
UKIP	Peter Elliot	454	23	
Liberal Democrats	David Rouane	192	10	
Green	Sam Hollick	103	5	
Turnout		1,938	30	
Conservative win (new seat)				

=== Didcot Ladygrove ===
Didcot Ladygrove
Party	Candidate	Votes	%	±%
Independent	Neville Harris	553	38	
Conservative	Bill Service	462	32	
Labour	Bill Atkinson	181	13	
UKIP	Paul Williams	167	12	
Liberal Democrats	Les Hopper	60	4	
Green	Sarah Edwards	18	1	
Turnout		1,441	30	
Independent gain from Conservative		Swing		

=== Didcot West ===
Didcot West
Party	Candidate	Votes	%	±%
Labour	Nick Hards	614	32	
Conservative	Tony Harbour	462	24	
UKIP	Graham Moores	396	20	
Independent	Terry Joslin	297	15	
Liberal Democrats	Andrew Jones	126	6	
Green	Hafiz Ladell	46	2	
Turnout		1,941	33	
Labour win (new seat)				

=== Eynsham ===
Eynsham
Party	Candidate	Votes	%	±%
Conservative	Charles Mathew	1,194	43	
UKIP	Jonathan Miller	585	21	
Labour	Jess Lawson	422	15	
Green	Kate Griffin	305	11	
Liberal Democrats	Diane West	300	11	
Turnout		2,806	29	
Conservative win (new seat)				

=== Faringdon ===
Faringdon
Party	Candidate	Votes	%	±%
Conservative	Judith Heathcoat	1,038	54	
Labour	Tony White	391	20	
UKIP	Stephen Beatty	277	14	
Green	Lesley Hoyle	141	7	
Liberal Democrats	Brian Sadler	89	5	
Turnout		1,936	26	
Conservative win (new seat)				

=== Goring ===
Goring
Party	Candidate	Votes	%	±%
Conservative	Kevin Bulmer	1,216	47	
UKIP	Nick Brazil	580	22	
Green	James Norman	326	13	
Liberal Democrats	Caroline Wardle	255	10	
Labour	Adam Wood	209	8	
Turnout		2,586	27	
Conservative win (new seat)				

=== Grove & Wantage ===
Grove & Wantage (2)
Party	Candidate	Votes	%	±%
Liberal Democrats	Jenny Hannaby	1,700	20	
Liberal Democrats	Zoé Patrick	1,651	20	
Conservative	Charlotte Dickson	1,309	16	
Conservative	Fiona Roper	1,106	13	
Labour Co-op	Jean Nunn-Price	610	7	
UKIP	Doug Tofte	599	7	
UKIP	Peter Jones	593	7	
Labour Co-op	Leon Foster-Hill	464	6	
Green	Kevin Harris	346	4	
Turnout		8,378	36	
Liberal Democrats hold		Swing		
Liberal Democrats hold		Swing		

=== Hanborough & Minster Lovell ===
Hanborough & Minster Lovell
Party	Candidate	Votes	%	±%
Conservative	Louise Chapman	1,186	44	
UKIP	Ken Clark	596	22	
Labour	Judith Wardle	412	15	
Liberal Democrats	Mike Baggaley	301	11	
Green	Andrew Wright	217	8	
Turnout		2,712	27	
Conservative win (new seat)				

=== Headington & Quarry ===
Headington & Quarry
Party	Candidate	Votes	%	±%
Liberal Democrats	Roz Smith	1,159	39	
Labour Co-op	Dee Sinclair	1,128	38	
Conservative	Duncan Hatfield	273	9	
UKIP	Alex Ashmore	246	8	
Green	Raymond Hitchins	172	6	
Turnout		2,978	35	
Liberal Democrats win (new seat)				

=== Hendreds & Harwell ===
Hendreds & Harwell
Party	Candidate	Votes	%	±%
Conservative	Stewart Lilly	1,119	48	
Labour	Stephen Webb	478	20	
UKIP	Jason Kent	474	20	
Liberal Democrats	Piran Fletcher	275	12	
Turnout		2,346	39	
Conservative win (new seat)				

=== Henley-on-Thames ===
Henley-on-Thames
Party	Candidate	Votes	%	±%
Conservative	David Smith	912	33	
Henley Residents	Stefan Gawrysiak	789	29	
UKIP	Ken Arlett	775	28	
Labour Co-op	Veronica Treacher	122	4	
Liberal Democrats	Asbjorg Dunker	90	3	
Green	Peter Dragonetti	68	2	
Turnout		2,756	40	
Conservative win (new seat)				

=== Iffley Fields & St Mary's ===
Iffley Fields & St Mary's
Party	Candidate	Votes	%	±%
Green	David Williams	1,111	46	
Labour	Steve Curran	1,034	43	
Conservative	Simon Mort	134	6	
Liberal Democrats	Tim Bearder	90	4	
Independent	Abdul Rafiq	49	2	
Turnout		2,418	32	
Green win (new seat)				

=== Isis ===
Isis
Party	Candidate	Votes	%	±%
Labour	John Tanner	1,104	52	
Green	Judy Chipchase	494	23	
Conservative	Lilian Sherwood	359	17	
Liberal Democrats	Catherine Hodgkinson	151	7	
Turnout		2,108	28	
Labour win (new seat)				

=== Jericho & Osney ===
Jericho & Osney
Party	Candidate	Votes	%	±%
Labour	Susanna Pressel	1,275	60	
Green	Sushila Dhall	469	22	
Conservative	George Harnett	250	12	
Liberal Democrats	Catherine Hilliard	125	6	
Turnout		2,119	27	
Labour win (new seat)				

=== Kennington & Radley ===
Kennington & Radley
Party	Candidate	Votes	%	±%
Liberal Democrats	Bob Johnston	1,372	50	
Conservative	Helen Horn	956	35	
Labour	David Bartlett	227	8	
Green	Christopher Henderson	201	7	
Turnout		2,756	39	
Liberal Democrats win (new seat)				

=== Kidlington South ===
Kidlington South
Party	Candidate	Votes	%	±%
Conservative	Maurice Billington	1,191	48	
UKIP	Sara Corr	434	18	
Labour	David James	359	14	
Liberal Democrats	Joe Claxton	281	11	
Green	Ian Middleton	213	9	
Turnout		2478	31	
Conservative win (new seat)				

=== Kingston & Cumnor ===
Kingston & Cumnor
Party	Candidate	Votes	%	±%
Conservative	Melinda Tilley	1,259	45	
UKIP	Jacqueline Jones	738	26	
Labour	Shirley Long	313	11	
Liberal Democrats	Val Shaw	248	9	
Green	Guy Langton	246	9	
Turnout		2,804	39	
Conservative win (new seat)				

=== Kirtlington & Kidlington North ===
Kirtlington & Kidlington North
Party	Candidate	Votes	%	±%
Conservative	Anthony Ian Gearing	873	34	
UKIP	Paul Clifton	550	21	
Liberal Democrats	Doug Williamson	518	20	
Labour	Trevor Blake	482	19	
Green	Glyn Sparkes	176	7	
Turnout		2,599	28	
Conservative win (new seat)				

=== Leys ===
Leys
Party	Candidate	Votes	%	±%
Labour Co-op	Val Smith	1,249	82	
Conservative	Patricia Jones	116	8	
Green	Lizzie McHale	114	7	
Liberal Democrats	Alasdair Murray	53	3	
Turnout		1,532	18	
Labour Co-op win (new seat)				

=== Marston & Northway ===
Marston & Northway
Party	Candidate	Votes	%	±%
Labour	Mark Lygo	1,028	46	
Independent	Charlie Haynes	319	14	
Conservative	Mark Bhagwandin	294	13	
UKIP	Nicholas Fell	288	13	
Green	Alistair Morris	208	9	
Liberal Democrats	Simon Bearder	113	5	
Turnout		2,250	28	
Labour win (new seat)				

=== North Hinksey ===
North Hinksey
Party	Candidate	Votes	%	±%
Liberal Democrats	Janet Godden	1,167	45	
Conservative	Eric Batts	686	27	
UKIP	Pam Gee	373	14	
Labour	James Douglas	204	8	
Green	Grant Nightingale	144	6	
Turnout		2,574	42	
Liberal Democrats win (new seat)				

=== Otmoor ===
Otmoor
Party	Candidate	Votes	%	±%
Conservative	Tim Hallchurch	767	41	
UKIP	Dickie Bird	452	24	
Labour	Andrew Hornsby-Smith	267	14	
Liberal Democrats	Nicholas Cotter	254	13	
Green	Graham Newell	152	8	
Turnout		1,892	23	
Conservative win (new seat)				

=== Ploughley ===
Ploughley
Party	Candidate	Votes	%	±%
Conservative	Catherine Fulljames	1,024	51	
UKIP	Sebastian Fairweather	507	25	
Green	Jenny Tamblyn	182	9	
Labour Co-op	Sean Woodcock	175	9	
Liberal Democrats	John Innes	115	6	
Turnout		2,003	31	
Conservative win (new seat)				

=== Rose Hill & Littlemore ===
Rose Hill & Littlemore
Party	Candidate	Votes	%	±%
Labour	Gill Sanders	1,051	63	
Conservative	Tim Patmore	274	17	
Green	Paul Skinner	255	15	
Liberal Democrats	Mark Wheeler	76	5	
Turnout		1,656	22	
Labour win (new seat)				

=== Shrivenham ===
Shrivenham
Party	Candidate	Votes	%	±%
Conservative	Yvonne Constance	1,261	52	
UKIP	David Moore	437	18	
Liberal Democrats	Stuart Brown	400	17	
Labour Co-op	Evelyne Godfrey	205	8	
Green	Ben Parr	115	5	
Turnout		2,418	38	
Conservative hold		Swing		

=== Sonning Common ===
Sonning Common
Party	Candidate	Votes	%	±%
Conservative	David Bartholomew	1,332	58	
UKIP	Peter Barnby	450	19	
Labour Co-op	David Winchester	341	15	
Green	Craig Simmons	185	8	
Turnout		2,308	37	
Conservative win (new seat)				

=== St Clement's & Cowley Marsh ===
St Clement's & Cowley Marsh
Party	Candidate	Votes	%	±%
Labour	Jamila Azad	751	41	
Green	Elise Benjamin	724	39	
Liberal Democrats	Graham Jones	162	9	
Conservative	Chip Sherwood	106	6	
UKIP	Stuart O'Reilly	98	5	
Independent	Pat Mylvaganam	10	1	
Turnout		1,851	25	
Labour win (new seat)				

=== St Margaret's ===
St Margaret's
Party	Candidate	Votes	%	±%
Liberal Democrats	John Howson	844	30	
Labour	James Fry	774	27	
Green	Ann Duncan	591	21	
Conservative	Vernon Porter	509	18	
UKIP	Franklyn Eveleigh	138	5	
Turnout		2,856	35	
Liberal Democrats win (new seat)				

=== Sutton Courtenay & Marcham ===
Sutton Courtenay & Marcham
Party	Candidate	Votes	%	±%
Liberal Democrats	Richard Webber	776	32	
Conservative	Gervase Duffield	749	31	
UKIP	Chris Parkes	529	22	
Labour Co-op	Sean McWhinnie	253	10	
Green	Adam Ramsay	104	4	
Turnout		2,411	31	
Liberal Democrats win (new seat)				

=== Thame & Chinnor ===
Thame & Chinnor (2)
Party	Candidate	Votes	%	±%
Conservative	Nick Carter	2,420	23	
Conservative	David Wilmshurst	1,824	18	
Labour	Mary Stiles	1,190	11	
UKIP	William Parkinson	1,149	11	
Liberal Democrats	David Bretherton	1,038	10	
UKIP	Michael Montgomery	937	9	
Liberal Democrats	David Laver	699	7	
Labour	Simon Stone	626	6	
Green	Colin Grenville	533	5	
Turnout		10,416	43	
Conservative win (new seat)				
Conservative win (new seat)				

=== University Parks ===
University Parks
Party	Candidate	Votes	%	±%
Green	Sam Coates	463	43	
Labour Co-op	Joseph Ottaway	297	27	
Conservative	Richard Treffler	207	19	
Liberal Democrats	Jane Mactaggart	81	7	
Turnout		1,086	16	
Green win (new seat)				

=== Wallingford ===
Wallingford
Party	Candidate	Votes	%	±%
Independent	Lynda Atkins	1,103	44	
UKIP	Lee Upcraft	492	20	
Conservative	Alan Thompson	435	17	
Labour	George Kneeshaw	247	10	
Green	Andrea Powell	139	6	
Liberal Democrats	Catherine Webber	86	3	
Turnout		2,502	38	
Independent win (new seat)				

=== Wheatley ===
Wheatley
Party	Candidate	Votes	%	±%
Liberal Democrats	Anne Purse	932	40	
Conservative	John Walsh	622	27	
UKIP	Dave Barnby	402	17	
Labour	Will Atkinson	209	9	
Green	Laura Rival	164	7	
Turnout		2,329	30	
Liberal Democrats win (new seat)				

=== Witney North & East ===
Witney North & East
Party	Candidate	Votes	%	±%
Conservative	Richard Langridge	1,094	39	
Labour	Duncan Hume	727	26	
UKIP	James Mawle	490	17	
Green	Stuart MacDonald	364	13	
Liberal Democrats	Ross Beadle	136	5	
Turnout		2,811	24	
Conservative hold		Swing		

=== Witney South & Central ===
Witney South & Central
Party	Candidate	Votes	%	±%
Labour Co-op	Laura Price	756	31	
UKIP	James Robertshaw	746	31	
Conservative	David Harvey	697	29	
Green	Freddie Peppiatt	132	5	
Liberal Democrats	David Dunmur	85	4	
Turnout		2,416	22	
Labour Co-op win (new seat)				

=== Witney West & Bampton ===
Witney West & Bampton
Party	Candidate	Votes	%	±%
Conservative	Simon Hoare	1,230	49	
UKIP	Erika Barnby	629	25	
Labour	Calvert McGibbon	351	14	
Green	Maurice Fantato	175	7	
Liberal Democrats	Gillian Workman	138	5	
Turnout		2,523	25	
Conservative win (new seat)				

=== Wolvercote & Summertown ===
Wolvercote & Summertown
Party	Candidate	Votes	%	±%
Liberal Democrats	Jean Fooks	1,386	50	
Conservative	Ken Bickers	571	21	
Green	Dick Wolff	442	16	
Labour	Michael Taylor	357	13	
Turnout		2,756	35	
Liberal Democrats win (new seat)				

=== Woodstock ===
Woodstock
Party	Candidate	Votes	%	±%
Conservative	Ian Hudspeth	1,209	41	
Liberal Democrats	Julian Cooper	712	24	
UKIP	Charles Bennett	480	16	
Labour	Nathaniel Miles	284	10	
Green	John O'Regan	237	8	
Turnout		2,922	30	
Conservative win (new seat)				

=== Wroxton & Hook Norton ===
Wroxton & Hook Norton
Party	Candidate	Votes	%	±%
Conservative	George Reynolds	1,709	55	
UKIP	Claire Webb	527	17	
Labour	Perran Moon	458	15	
Green	Colin Clark	229	7	
Liberal Democrats	Peter Davis	175	6	
Turnout		3,098	36	
Conservative win (new seat)				
