= 2017 Oxfordshire County Council election =

2017 UK local government election

← 2013	4 May 2017	2021 →

All 63 seats to Oxfordshire County Council 32 seats needed for a majority
- Turnout: 38.5%

	First party	Second party	Third party
Party	Conservative	Labour	Liberal Democrats
Seats won	31	14	13
Seat change	Steady	▼1	▲2
Popular vote	80,438	43,172	47,799
Percentage	41.3%	22.2%	24.5%
Swing	▲6.8%	▲0.9%	▲8.6%
	Fourth party	Fifth party	Sixth party
Party	Independent	Henley Residents	Green
Seats won	4	1	0
Seat change	Steady	▲1	▼2
Popular vote	6,689	1,747	13,978
Percentage	3.4%	0.9%	7.2%
Swing	▲0.4%	▲0.4%	▼1.8%
- Map showing the results of the 2017 Oxfordshire County Council elections.
Council control before election
No Overall Control (Con minority)
Council control after election
No Overall Control (Con/Ind coalition)

The 2017 Oxfordshire County Council election took place on 4 May 2017 as part of the 2017 local elections in the United Kingdom. All 63 councillors were elected from 61 electoral divisions which returned either one or two county councillors each by first-past-the-post voting for a four-year term of office.

== Results - Summary ==
Oxfordshire County Council election, 2017
Party	Seats	Gains	Losses	Net gain/loss	Seats %	Votes %	Votes	+/−
Conservative	31	3	3	0	49.2	41.3	80,438	+6.8
Liberal Democrats	13	2	0	+2	20.6	24.5	47,799	+8.6
Labour	14	2	3	-1	22.2	22.2	43,172	+0.9
Green	0	0	2	-2	0	7.2	13.978	-1.8
Independent	4	0	0	0	6.4	3.4	6,689	+0.4
Henley Residents	1	1	0	+1	1.6	0.9	1,747	+0.4
UKIP	0	0	0	0	0	0.5	1,056	-15.4

== Aftermath ==
The Conservatives won the same number of seats as they did in 2013, one seat short of a majority.

For the past four years, the Conservatives had been able to govern in a minority administration with the support of three of the four independent councillors - Lynda Atkins, Mark Gray and Les Sibley. In 2016, one of these independents, Cllr. Atkins, left the alliance.

All three of these independent councillors were re-elected in these elections, alongside Cllr Neville Harris, who was elected for the first time in 2013 but had previously declined to support the Conservatives.

After talks with the independent councillors, two - Mark Gray and Les Sibley - agreed to continue to support the Conservatives with Cllr. Gray given the cabinet role as member for local communities. This gave the Conservative/Independent coalition a majority of 33 out of the 63 seats.

== Division Results ==
=== Abingdon East ===
Abingdon East
Party	Candidate	Votes	%	±%
Liberal Democrats	Alison Rosemary Rooke *	1,699	53.1	+6.3
Conservative	David James Pope	1,102	34.4	+7.9
Labour	Louis Francis McEvoy	224	7.0	−1.7
Green	Paul Timothy Norton	178	5.6	−0.7
Majority				
Turnout		3,203	42.4	+7.4
Liberal Democrats hold		Swing	-0.8	

=== Abingdon North ===
Abingdon North
Party	Candidate	Votes	%	±%
Liberal Democrats	Emily Jane Smith	2,029	50.6	+19.2
Conservative	Sandy Lovatt *	1,494	37.2	−1.4
Labour	Jon Bounds	291	7.3	−1.1
Green	Cheryl Karen Briggs	198	4.9	−2.4
Majority				
Turnout		4,012	45.1	+12.1
Liberal Democrats gain from Conservative		Swing	+10.3	

=== Abingdon South ===
Abingdon South
Party	Candidate	Votes	%	±%
Liberal Democrats	Neil Fawcett *	1,559	46.3	+9.6
Conservative	Mike Badcock	1,308	38.8	+10.5
Labour	George Douglas Ryall	319	9.5	−7.2
Green	Jim Broadbent	184	5.5	+0.3
Majority				
Turnout		3,370	40.1	+5.7
Liberal Democrats hold		Swing	-0.5	

=== Banbury Calthorpe ===
Banbury Calthorpe
Party	Candidate	Votes	%	±%
Conservative	Eddie Reeves	1,294	52.47	+21.4
Labour Co-op	Joe Walsh	825	33.45	+1.5
Liberal Democrats	Brent Jackson	213	8.64	+4.2
Green	Bernard Geoffrey Dod	134	5.43	+0.3
Majority				
Majority		469	19.02	
Turnout		2,466	29	+10
Conservative gain from Labour		Swing	+10.0	

=== Banbury Grimsbury & Castle ===
Banbury Grimsbury & Castle
Party	Candidate	Votes	%	±%
Labour	Hannah Louise Banfield	1,098	48.18	+5.0
Conservative	Paul Austin Sargent	819	35.94	+3.8
Liberal Democrats	Dave Wiles	148	6.5	+3.7
UKIP	Jason Williams	113	5.0	−12.5
Green	Jack Arthur Barton	101	4.43	+/−0
Majority		279	12.24	
Turnout		2,279	26	+2
Labour hold		Swing	+0.6	

=== Banbury Hardwick ===
Banbury Hardwick
Party	Candidate	Votes	%	±%
Conservative	Tony Ilott	1,131	43.22	+14.0
Labour Co-op	Surinder Dhesi *	1,076	41.12	+6.3
Liberal Democrats	Alistair Charles Craig	165	6.30	+2.1
UKIP	Sara Louise Corr	148	5.66	−22.2
Green	Andy Aris	97	3.71	−0.1
Majority		55	2.10	
Turnout		2,617	26	+3
Conservative gain from Labour Co-op		Swing	+3.9	

=== Banbury Ruscote ===
Banbury Ruscote
Party	Candidate	Votes	%	±%
Labour Co-op	Mark David Cherry	1,194	58.33	+14.3
Conservative	David Frederick Beverly	574	28.04	+1.3
UKIP	Linda Michelle Wren	125	6.11	−17.9
Liberal Democrats	Bette Melling	86	4.20	N/A
Green	Christopher John Manley	68	3.32	−2.0
Majority		620	30.29	
Turnout		2,047	22	−1
Labour Co-op hold		Swing	+6.5	

=== Barton, Sandhills & Risinghurst ===
Barton, Sandhills & Risinghurst
Party	Candidate	Votes	%	±%
Labour	Glynis Mary Phillips *	1,087	48.6	−2.5
Conservative	Cath Convery	432	19.3	+7.9
Liberal Democrats	Steve Wheeler	287	12.8	+1.2
Independent	Chaka Artwell	254	11.4	New
Green	Symon James Hill	175	7.8	+0.2
Turnout		2,235	33.0	+9.1
Labour hold		Swing	-5.2	

=== Benson & Cholsey ===
Benson & Cholsey
Party	Candidate	Votes	%	±%
Independent	Mark Stuart Gray *	1645	49.7	+3.3
Conservative	Caroline Anne Newton	1077	32.5	+11.3
Labour	Jim Merritt	313	9.5	+3.5
Liberal Democrats	Adrian Lee Cull	277	8.4	New
Turnout		3312	31	−6
Independent hold		Swing	-4.0	

=== Berinsfield & Garsington ===
Berinsfield & Garsington
Party	Candidate	Votes	%	±%
Conservative	Elizabeth Lorraine Lindsay-Gale *	1579	54.7	+7.4
Green	Robin Francis Bennett	543	18.8	+7.9
Liberal Democrats	Simon Geoffrey Davenport Thompson	418	14.5	+8.6
Labour Co-op	Evelyne Godfrey	348	12.0	−2.6
Turnout		2888	28	−8
Conservative hold		Swing	-0.3	

=== Bicester North ===
Bicester North
Party	Candidate	Votes	%	±%
Conservative	Lawrie Stratford *	1302	55.3	+16.0
Labour	Margaret Elizabeth Lyon	535	22.7	+5.5
Liberal Democrats	Daniel Morgan Murphy	358	15.2	+9.6
UKIP	Bob Massingham	161	6.8	−19.5
Turnout		2356	25	+3
Conservative hold		Swing	+5.3	

=== Bicester Town ===
Bicester Town
Party	Candidate	Votes	%	±%
Conservative	Michael Frederick Waine *	1454	61.1	+12.3
Labour	Sarah Elizabeth Haydon	585	24.6	+0.3
Green	Robert Joseph Nixon	176	7.4	+3.1
Liberal Democrats	Conor McKenzie	166	7.0	+4.0
Turnout		2381	28	0
Conservative hold		Swing	+6.0	

=== Bicester West ===
Bicester West
Party	Candidate	Votes	%	±%
Independent	Les Sibley *	1559	62.8	+10.9
Conservative	Debbie Pickford	452	18.2	−1.4
Labour	Chris Howells	270	10.9	−1.9
Liberal Democrats	Chris Tatton	74	3.0	+2.3
UKIP	Toni Renee Harris	68	2.7	−10.3
Green	Liz Taylor	58	2.3	+0.3
Turnout		2481	29	−2
Independent hold		Swing	+6.2	

=== Bloxham & Easington ===
Bloxham & Easington
Party	Candidate	Votes	%	±%
Conservative	Kieron Paul Mallon *	1744	60.8	+7.2
Labour	Susan Christie	587	20.5	+5.4
Liberal Democrats	Peter Davis	239	8.3	+3.3
Green	Non Wyn Kinchin-Smith	174	6.1	+1.3
UKIP	Brian Crockett	126	4.4	−17.0
Turnout		2870	28	−5
Conservative hold		Swing	+0.9	

=== Burford & Carterton North ===
Burford & Carterton North
Party	Candidate	Votes	%	±%
Conservative	Nicholas Anthony Field-Johnson	1375	66.8	+17.7
Liberal Democrats	Edward Mortimer	335	16.3	+5.5
Labour Co-op	Dave Wesson	219	10.6	+1.6
Green	Rosanna Pearson	128	6.2	−0.7
Turnout		2057	29	+5
Conservative hold		Swing	+6.1	

=== Carterton South & West ===
Carterton South & West
Party	Candidate	Votes	%	±%
Conservative	Pete Handley *	1691	69.5	+17.3
Labour	Moira Christine Swann	290	11.9	+1.0
Liberal Democrats	Ivan Aguado Melet	218	9.0	+4.5
Green	Anthony Edward Barrett	139	5.7	+0.2
UKIP	David Jack Holms McLeod	95	3.9	−23.0
Turnout		2433	28	−9
Conservative hold		Swing	+8.2	

=== Chalgrove & Watlington ===
Chalgrove & Watlington
Party	Candidate	Votes	%	±%
Conservative	Steve Harrod	1884	54.0	−3.7
Liberal Democrats	Sue Cooper	1224	35.1	+17.3
Labour	P'nina Lesley Drye	225	6.5	−6.1
Green	Robert James Henry Paynter	153	4.4	−7.5
Turnout		3486	31	−4
Conservative hold		Swing	-10.5	

=== Charlbury & Wychwood ===
Charlbury & Wychwood
Party	Candidate	Votes	%	±%
Liberal Democrats	Liz Leffman	2105	52.3	+22.8
Conservative	Rodney Scott Rose *	1579	39.2	−0.2
Labour	Sian Priscilla Florence O'Neill	210	5.2	−3.6
Green	Celia Jocelyn Kerslake	132	3.3	−3.9
Turnout		4026	50	+19
Liberal Democrats gain from Conservative		Swing	+11.5	

=== Chipping Norton ===
Chipping Norton
Party	Candidate	Votes	%	±%
Conservative	Hilary Rose Biles *	1635	45.2	−3.9
Labour Co-op	Geoff Saul	1231	34.1	+3.2
Liberal Democrats	Andy Graham	584	16.2	+13.6
Green	Claire Elliane Lasko	98	2.7	−1.8
UKIP	Jim Stanley	66	1.8	−11.2
Turnout		3614	44	+15
Conservative hold		Swing	-3.6	

=== Churchill & Lye Valley ===
Churchill & Lye Valley
Party	Candidate	Votes	%	±%
Labour Co-op	Liz Brighouse *	1,339	61.6	−2.6
Conservative	Johnson Mackline Kyeswa	373	17.1	+3.0
Green	Steven Mark Dawe	264	12.1	−2.9
Liberal Democrats	Peter Charles Coggins	199	9.1	+2.4
Turnout		2,175	26.7	+8.0
Labour Co-op hold		Swing	-2.8	

=== Cowley ===
Cowley
Party	Candidate	Votes	%	±%
Labour	John Leo Sanders *	1,363	45.6	−9.5
Green	Hazel Frances Dawe	717	24.0	+5.6
Independent	Judith Anne Harley	340	11.4	New
Conservative	Derron Jarell	335	11.2	−9.3
Liberal Democrats	Harry Samuels	234	7.8	+1.8
Turnout		2,989	35.6	+13.9
Labour hold		Swing	-7.6	

=== Deddington ===
Deddington
Party	Candidate	Votes	%	±%
Conservative	Arash Ali Fatemian *	2154	58.3	+11.9
Labour	Annette Murphy	509	13.8	−0.3
Liberal Democrats	Ian Richard Thomas	451	12.2	+5.7
Green	Aaron James Bliss	434	11.7	−2.9
UKIP	Alan Paul Harris	146	4.0	−14.4
Turnout		3694	32	−3
Conservative hold		Swing	+6.1	

=== Didcot East & Hagbourne ===
Didcot East & Hagbourne
Party	Candidate	Votes	%	±%
Conservative	Simon Richard Clarke	1164	47.8	+11.0
Labour	Denise MacDonald	685	28.1	+3.5
Liberal Democrats	Les Hopper	588	24.1	+14.2
Turnout		2437	25	−5
Conservative hold		Swing	+3.8	

=== Didcot Ladygrove ===
Didcot Ladygrove
Party	Candidate	Votes	%	±%
Independent	Neville Frank Harris *	965	46.1	+7.7
Conservative	Bill Service	495	23.7	−8.4
Liberal Democrats	Hayleigh Marie Gascoigne	441	21.1	+16.9
Labour	Pam Siggers	191	9.1	−3.5
Turnout		2092	30	0
Independent hold		Swing	+8.1	

=== Didcot West ===
Didcot West
Party	Candidate	Votes	%	±%
Conservative	Alan Roy Thompson	1215	42.4	+18.6
Labour	Nick Hards *	1048	36.6	+5.0
Liberal Democrats	Veronika Maria Williams	465	16.2	+9.7
Green	Tim Eden	137	4.8	+2.4
Turnout		2865	24	−9
Conservative gain from Labour		Swing	+6.8	

=== Eynsham ===
Eynsham
Party	Candidate	Votes	%	±%
Conservative	Charles Christopher Bruce Mathew *	1716	44.3	+1.7
Liberal Democrats	Timothy Martin Bearder	1621	41.9	+31.2
Labour	Elsa Louise Dawson	347	9.0	−6.0
Green	Nicholas Goodwin	188	4.6	−6.3
Turnout		3872	47	+18
Conservative hold		Swing	-14.8	

=== Faringdon ===
Faringdon
Party	Candidate	Votes	%	±%
Conservative	Judy Heathcoat *	1374	51.8	−1.8
Liberal Democrats	David Andrew Grant	1033	38.9	+34.3
Labour	Stephen Smith	247	9.3	−10.9
Turnout		2654	38	+12
Conservative hold		Swing	-18.1	

=== Goring ===
Goring
Party	Candidate	Votes	%	±%
Conservative	Kevin Bulmer *	1918	58.1	+11.1
Liberal Democrats	Laura Rose Coyle	601	18.2	+8.3
Labour	Dave Bowen	393	11.9	+3.8
Green	Jim Dowling	389	11.8	−0.8
Turnout		3301	28	+1
Conservative hold		Swing	+1.4	

=== Grove & Wantage ===
Grove & Wantage
Party	Candidate	Votes	%	±%
Liberal Democrats	Jenny Hannaby *	2403	46.8	
Liberal Democrats	Zoé Anne Patrick *	2153	41.9	
Conservative	Steve Trinder	1958	38.1	
Conservative	Ben Mabbett	1738	33.9	
Labour	Jean Elizabeth Nunn-Price	745	14.5	
Green	Kevin Alan Harris	436	8.5	
Labour	George Etherington	127	2.5	
Turnout		5134	27	−9
Liberal Democrats hold		Swing	+4	
Liberal Democrats hold		Swing	+0.3	

=== Hanborough & Minster Lovell ===
Hanborough & Minster Lovell
Party	Candidate	Votes	%	±%
Conservative	Liam Martin Simon Walker	1814	51.7	+8.0
Labour	Merilyn Elizabeth Davies	812	23.1	+7.9
Liberal Democrats	Andy Crick	727	20.7	+9.6
Green	Andy Wright	159	4.5	−3.5
Turnout		3512	43	+16
Conservative hold		Swing	+0.1	

=== Headington & Quarry ===
Headington & Quarry
Party	Candidate	Votes	%	±%
Liberal Democrats	Roz Smith *	2,014	54.7	+15.8
Labour	Bill Asquith	1,122	30.4	−7.5
Conservative	Duncan Valentine Hatfield	392	10.6	+1.4
Green	Miranda Shaw	157	4.3	−1.5
Turnout		3,685	45.5	+10.1
Liberal Democrats hold		Swing	+11.7	

=== Hendreds & Harwell ===
Hendreds & Harwell
Party	Candidate	Votes	%	±%
Conservative	Mike Fox-Davies	1683	54.6	+6.9
Liberal Democrats	Jim Loder	568	18.4	+6.7
Labour	Stephen Edwin Dominic Webb	537	17.4	−3.0
Green	Nicholas Simon Freestone	296	9.6	New
Turnout		3084	31	−8
Conservative hold		Swing	+0.1	

=== Henley-on-Thames ===
Henley-on-Thames
Party	Candidate	Votes	%	±%
Henley Residents	Stefan John Gawrysiak	1747	47.8	+19.2
Conservative	David Roger Nimmo Smith *	1362	37.2	+4.1
Liberal Democrats	David John Thomas	250	6.8	+3.5
Labour	Jackie Walker	166	4.5	+0.1
Green	Elisabeth Marjorie Geake	133	3.6	+1.1
Turnout		3658	29	−11
Henley Residents gain from Conservative		Swing	+7.6	

=== Iffley Fields & St Mary's ===
Iffley Fields & St Mary's
Party	Candidate	Votes	%	±%
Labour	Helen Theresa Evans	1,525	46.5	+4.0
Green	Arthur David Williams *	1,326	40.5	−5.2
Liberal Democrats	Andy McKay	222	6.8	+3.1
Conservative	Simon James Bazley	181	5.5	+0.0
Turnout		3,254	48.0	+16.2
Labour gain from Green		Swing	+4.6	

=== Isis ===
Isis
Party	Candidate	Votes	%	±%
Labour	Sobia Afridi	1,559	55.3	+3.2
Liberal Democrats	Nicholas John Harding	501	17.8	+10.7
Conservative	Alex Curtis	409	14.5	−2.4
Green	Doug Kohler	336	11.9	−11.4
Turnout		2,805	40.7	+12.7
Labour hold		Swing	+3.2	

=== Jericho & Osney ===
Jericho & Osney
Party	Candidate	Votes	%	±%
Labour	Susanna Pressel *	1,667	58.6	−1.3
Liberal Democrats	Jonathan David Adcock	455	16.0	+10.1
Green	Lois Knight Muddiman	418	14.7	−7.3
Conservative	Jason John Richard Fiddaman	269	9.5	−2.3
UKIP	David Hearn	32	1.1	New
Turnout		2,841	40.5	+13.3
Labour hold		Swing	-1.3	

=== Kennington & Radley ===
Kennington & Radley
Party	Candidate	Votes	%	±%
Liberal Democrats	Bob Johnston *	1818	51.9	+2.1
Conservative	Eric Batts	1270	36.2	+1.5
Labour Co-op	Martin Abraham Stott	220	6.3	−1.9
Green	Christopher Roy Henderson	196	5.6	−1.7
Turnout		3504	42.7	+10.2
Liberal Democrats hold		Swing	+0.3	

=== Kidlington South ===
Kidlington South
Party	Candidate	Votes	%	±%
Conservative	Maurice Billington *	1672	57	+9
Liberal Democrats	Samuel John Hubbard	560	19	+8
Labour	Cath Arakelian	544	18	+4
Green	Fiona Valerie Mawson	182	6	−3
Turnout		2958	32	+1
Conservative hold		Swing	+9	

=== Kingston & Cumnor ===
Kingston & Cumnor
Party	Candidate	Votes	%	±%
Conservative	Anda Maruta Fitzgerald-O'Connor	2064	57	+12
Liberal Democrats	Jerry Avery	864	24	+15
Labour	Bella Bond	397	11	0
Green	Gerard Matthew Cullum Lewis	272	8	+1
Turnout		3597	33	−6
Conservative hold		Swing	+12	

=== Kirtlington & Kidlington North ===
Kirtlington & Kidlington North
Party	Candidate	Votes	%	±%
Conservative	Carmen Griffiths	1,817	48	+14
Liberal Democrats	Dawn Susan Glatz	1,440	38	18
Labour	Nick Walker	410	11	−8
Green	Ian Michael Middleton	152	4	−3
Turnout		3,819	45	+6
Conservative hold		Swing	+14	

=== Leys ===
Leys
Party	Candidate	Votes	%	±%
Labour	Deborah McIlveen	1,227	71.8	−8.7
Conservative	Linkson Andrae Sherman Jack	275	16.1	+8.6
Liberal Democrats	Rosemary Anne Beatrice Morlin	98	5.7	+2.3
Green	Elizabeth Ellen McHale	95	5.6	−1.8
Turnout		1,695	19.9	+1.9
Labour hold		Swing	-8.7	

=== Marston & Northway ===
Marston & Northway
Party	Candidate	Votes	%	±%
Labour	Mark Robert Lygo *	1,374	48.1	+2.7
Conservative	Mark Bhagwandin	695	24.3	+11.3
Liberal Democrats	Maria Bourbon	473	16.6	+11.6
Green	Alistair David Pryce Morris	293	10.3	+1.1
Turnout		2,835	38.5	+10.9
Labour hold		Swing	+2.7	

=== North Hinksey ===
North Hinksey
Party	Candidate	Votes	%	±%
Liberal Democrats	Judy Roberts	1767	52.8	+7.8
Conservative	Dina Black	1058	31.6	+4.6
Labour	Richard George Llewellyn Kendall	321	9.6	+1.6
Green	Anne-Marie Heslop	198	5.9	−0.1
Turnout		3344	44.3	+2.3
Liberal Democrats hold		Swing	+7.8	

=== Otmoor ===
Otmoor
Party	Candidate	Votes	%	±%
Conservative	Dan Sames	1693	61.1	+20.1
Labour	Michael Nixon	473	17.1	+3.1
Liberal Democrats	Liz Barker	369	13.3	0.3
Green	Roger David Nixon	235	8.5	0.5
Turnout		2770	37.0	+14.0
Conservative hold		Swing	+20.1	

=== Ploughley ===
Ploughley
Party	Candidate	Votes	%	±%
Conservative	Ian Corkin	1395	50.5	−0.5
Independent	Catherine Ann Fulljames	637	23.1	−
Labour	Steven John Uttley	245	8.9	−0.1
Liberal Democrats	Dillie Keane	228	8.3	+2.3
Green	Jenny Tamblyn	135	4.9	−4.1
UKIP	Dickie Bird	122	4.4	−20.6
Turnout		2762	42	+11
Conservative hold		Swing	-0.5	

=== Rose Hill and Littlemore ===
Rose Hill & Littlemore
Party	Candidate	Votes	%	±%
Labour	Gill Sanders *	1,410	59.9	−2.9
Conservative	Daniel Stafford	462	19.6	+3.2
Liberal Democrats	David William Bowkett	259	11.0	+6.5
Green	Abdul Hakeem Rafiq	196	8.3	−6.9
Turnout		2,327	30.1	+8.5
Labour hold		Swing	-2.9	

=== Shrivenham ===
Shrivenham
Party	Candidate	Votes	%	±%
Conservative	Yvonne Jean Constance *	1874	64.6	+12.6
Labour Co-op	Sarah Caroline Church	441	15.2	+7.2
Liberal Democrats	Andrew Crawford	390	13.4	−3.6
Green	Joanna Louise Shipley	196	6.8	+1.8
Turnout		2901	37.8	−0.2
Conservative hold		Swing	+12.6	

=== Sonning Common ===
Sonning Common
Party	Candidate	Votes	%	±%
Conservative	David Christopher Bartholomew *	1930	70.6	+12.6
Liberal Democrats	Lucio Fumi	442	16.2	−
Labour Co-op	Veronica Treacher	363	13.3	−1.7
Turnout		2735	35.5	−1.5
Conservative hold		Swing	+12.6	

=== St Clement's and Cowley Marsh ===
St Clement's & Cowley Marsh
Party	Candidate	Votes	%	±%
Labour	Jamila Begum Azad *	1,170	50.1	+9.6
Green	Nuala Ann Young	726	31.1	−8.0
Liberal Democrats	Graham Roderick Jones	247	10.6	+1.8
Conservative	Timothy Douglas Patmore	177	7.6	+1.9
Turnout		2,320	37.9	+13.1
Labour hold		Swing	+9.6	

=== St Margaret's ===
St Margaret's
Party	Candidate	Votes	%	±%
Liberal Democrats	John Orrell Howson *	1,460	41.2	+11.8
Labour	James Fry	1,355	38.3	+11.3
Conservative	Penelope Anne Lenon	541	15.3	−2.5
Green	Al Wilson	176	5.0	−15.6
Turnout		3,532	49.8	+14.5
Liberal Democrats hold		Swing	+11.8	

=== Sutton Courtenay & Marcham ===
Sutton Courtenay & Marcham
Party	Candidate	Votes	%	±%
Liberal Democrats	Richard John Webber *	1,345	45	+13
Conservative	Stuart Philip Davenport	1,311	43.8	+12.8
Labour	Coral Ann Avril Plumb	239	8	−2
Green	Craig Simmons	96	3.2	−0.8
Turnout		2,991	38.4	+7.4
Liberal Democrats hold		Swing	+13	

=== Thame & Chinnor ===
Thame & Chinnor
Party	Candidate	Votes	%	±%
Conservative	Nick Carter *	2,959	52.8	
Conservative	Jeannette Ann Matelot Green	2,781	49.7	
Liberal Democrats	Kate Michelle Gregory	1,609	28.7	
Liberal Democrats	Gaby Oatway	1,461	26.1	
Labour	David Matthew Bailey	750	13.4	
Labour	Simon Stone	597	10.7	
Green	Louisa Mary Wilkinson	391	7.0	
Green	Ali Gordon-Creed	328	5.9	
Turnout		5,601	26%	
Conservative hold		Swing	+6.7	
Conservative hold		Swing	+6.7	

=== University Parks ===
University Parks
Party	Candidate	Votes	%	±%
Labour	Emma Christina Turnbull	691	41.8	+14.5
Liberal Democrats	Lucinda Greta Olivia Chamberlain	400	24.2	+16.7
Green	Benjamin Raphael Carter	352	21.3	−21.2
Conservative	Gary William Dixon	199	12.0	−7.0
Turnout		1,642	32.7	+16.5
Labour gain from Green		Swing	+17.9	

=== Wallingford ===
Wallingford
Party	Candidate	Votes	%	±%
Independent	Lynda Susan Atkins *	1,143	39.4	−4.6
Conservative	Leo Docherty	699	24.1	+7.1
Liberal Democrats	David Rouane	379	13.1	+10.1
Labour	George William Kneeshaw	363	12.5	+2.5
Green	Sue Ap-Roberts	318	11	+5
Turnout		2,902	36.9	−1.1
Independent hold		Swing	-4.6	

=== Wheatley ===
Wheatley
Party	Candidate	Votes	%	±%
Liberal Democrats	Kirsten Renee Johnson	1,372	45.2	+5.2
Conservative	John Patrick Walsh	1,304	42.9	+15.9
Labour	John Gerard Mercer	361	11.9	+2.9
Turnout		3,037	41.4	+11.4
Liberal Democrats hold		Swing	+5.2	

=== Witney North & East ===
Witney North & East
Party	Candidate	Votes	%	±%
Conservative	Suzanne Elizabeth Bartington	1,756	53	+14
Labour	Trevor Ian License	854	25.8	−0.2
Liberal Democrats	Gillian Elizabeth Workman	451	13.6	+8.6
Green	Stuart Sutherland MacDonald	254	7.7	−5.3
Turnout		3,315	36.4	+12.4
Conservative hold		Swing	+14	

=== Witney South & Central ===
Witney South & Central
Party	Candidate	Votes	%	±%
Labour Co-op	Laura Margaret Price *	1,361	45.6	+14.6
Conservative	Alan Keith Beames	1,235	41.4	+12.4
Liberal Democrats	Jake Ryan Acock	257	8.6	+4.6
Green	Andy King	133	4.5	−0.5
Turnout		2,986	35.4	+13.4
Labour Co-op hold		Swing	+14.6	

=== Witney West & Bampton ===
Witney West & Bampton
Party	Candidate	Votes	%	±%
Conservative	Ted Fenton	1,820	62.7	+13.7
Liberal Democrats	Christopher John Blount	517	17.8	+12.8
Labour	Calvert Charles Stuart McGibbon	390	13.4	−0.6
Green	Alma Ann Tumilowicz	174	6	−1
Turnout		2,901	34.9	+9.9
Conservative hold		Swing	+13.7	

=== Wolvercote and Summertown ===
Wolvercote & Summertown
Party	Candidate	Votes	%	±%
Liberal Democrats	Christopher Paul Buckley	1909	53.2	+3.3
Conservative	Kenneth Gerald Bickers	804	22.4	+1.8
Labour	Lucas Bertholdi-Sadd	550	15.3	+2.5
Green	Sarah Janet Edwards	323	9.0	−6.9
Turnout		3,586	47.8	+12.6
Liberal Democrats hold		Swing	+3.3	

=== Woodstock ===
Woodstock
Party	Candidate	Votes	%	±%
Conservative	Ian Donald Hudspeth *	1,694	48	+7
Liberal Democrats	Julian Craig Cooper	1,348	38	+14
Labour	Dave Baldwin	324	9	−1
Green	David James Chanter	182	5	−3
Turnout		3,548	44	+14
Conservative hold		Swing	+7	

=== Wroxton and Hook Norton ===
Wroxton and Hook Norton
Party	Candidate	Votes	%	±%
Conservative	George Anthony Reynolds *	2,477	65	+10
Labour	Anne Felicia Cullen	569	15	0
Liberal Democrats	Julian Greenwood	500	13	+7
Green	Shaun Edward Greenslade-Hibbert	249	7	0
Turnout		3,795	37	+1
Conservative hold		Swing	+10	

== By-elections 2017-2021 ==
=== Iffley Fields and St. Mary's ===
Iffley Fields and St. Mary's, 18 October 2018
Party	Candidate	Votes	%	±%
Labour	Damian Joel Haywood	1,162	48.6	2.1 ▲
Green	Arthur David Williams	1,087	45.4	4.9 ▲
Conservative	Paul John Sims	100	4.2	1.3 ▼
Liberal Democrats	Josie Proctor	43	1.8	5.0 ▼
Turnout		2,392	33.0	15.0 ▼
Labour hold		Swing	1.4 ▼	

=== Grove & Wantage ===
Grove & Wantage, 15 November 2018
Party	Candidate	Votes	%	±%
Liberal Democrats	Nicola Jane Murdoch Hanna	1,925	47.9	6.0 ▲
Conservative	Benjamin David Hugh Mabbett	1,447	36.0	2.1 ▼
Labour	David Joseph Gernon	459	11.4	0.5 ▼
Green	Kevin Alan Harris	185	4.6	3.9 ▼
Turnout		4,016	27.9	7.8 ▼
Liberal Democrats hold		Swing	4.1 ▲	

=== Wheatley ===
Wheatley, 29 November 2018
Party	Candidate	Votes	%	±%
Liberal Democrats	Timothy Martin Bearder	1,380	61.0	15.8 ▲
Conservative	John Patrick Walsh	705	31.2	11.7 ▼
Labour	Michael Nixon	178	7.9	4.0 ▼
Turnout		2,263	31.0	10.4 ▼
Liberal Democrats hold		Swing	13.8 ▲	

=== Wallingford ===
Wallingford, 28 November 2019
Party	Candidate	Votes	%	±%
Green	Pete Sudbury	998	40.9	29.9 ▲
Conservative	Adrian Lloyd	755	31.0	6.9 ▲
Independent	Elaine Hornsby	483	19.8	New
Labour	George William Kneeshaw	202	8.3	4.2 ▼
Turnout		2,438	30.2	6.7 ▼
Green gain from Independent		Swing	23.0 ▲	
