= 2023 South Oxfordshire District Council election =

2023 English local election

- 4 May 2023

All 36 seats to South Oxfordshire District Council 19 seats needed for a majority
- Turnout: 36.7%

	First party	Second party	Third party
Leader	David Rouane	Robin Bennett	Stefan Gawrysiak
Party	Liberal Democrats	Green	Henley Residents
Last election	12 seats, 27.8%	5 seats, 13.8%	3 seats, 4.9%
Seats won	21	8	3
Seat change	▲9	▲3	Steady
Popular vote	27,852	12,241	5,143
Percentage	35.8%	15.7%	6.6%
Swing	▲8.0%	▲1.9%	▲1.7%
	Fourth party	Fifth party
Leader	Mocky Khan	Jane Murphy
Party	Labour	Conservative
Last election	3 seats, 10.4%	10 seats, 29.3%
Seats won	3	1
Seat change	Steady	▼9
Popular vote	6,597	24,051
Percentage	8.5%	30.9%
Swing	▼1.9%	▲1.6%
- Winner of each seat at the 2023 South Oxfordshire District Council election
Leader before election
David Rouane
Liberal Democrat
No overall control
Leader after election
David Rouane
Liberal Democrat

The 2023 South Oxfordshire District Council election took place on 4 May 2023 to elect members of South Oxfordshire District Council in Oxfordshire, England. This was on the same day as other local elections across England.

Prior to the election the council was under no overall control, being run by a Liberal Democrat and Green coalition. The Liberal Democrats won a majority of seats at this election, although chose to continue to operate in partnership with the Greens.

== Summary ==
=== Election result ===
The Liberal Democrats gained control (from No Overall Control) at this election. The Conservatives lost all except one seat at this election, with the Lib Dems and Green Party making gains. Labour and the Henley Residents Group retained three seats each.

2023 South Oxfordshire District Council election
Party	Candidates	Seats	Gains	Losses	Net gain/loss	Seats %	Votes %	Votes	+/−
Liberal Democrats	24	21	9	0	▲9	58.3	35.8	27,852	+8.0
Green	12	8	3	0	▲3	22.2	15.7	12,241	+1.9
Labour	10	3	0	0	Steady	8.3	8.5	6,597	–1.9
Henley Residents	3	3	0	0	Steady	8.3	6.6	5,143	+1.7
Conservative	36	1	0	9	▼9	2.8	30.9	24,051	+1.6
Independent	3	0	0	3	▼3	0.0	1.5	1,154	–10.8
SDP	2	0	0	0	Steady	0.0	0.7	515	N/A
Reform	2	0	0	0	Steady	0.0	0.3	257	N/A

== Ward results ==
The Statement of Persons Nominated, which details the candidates standing in each ward, was released by South Oxfordshire District Council following the close of nominations on 5 April 2023.

* = sitting councillor in this ward prior to election

=== Benson and Crowmarsh ===
Benson & Crowmarsh (2 seats)
Party	Candidate	Votes	%	±%
Liberal Democrats	Sue Cooper*	1,589	63.2	+5.1
Green	Andrea Powell*	1,534	61.0	+9.7
Conservative	Felix Bloomfield	799	31.8	–1.3
Conservative	Gary Flux	719	28.6	–2.6
Turnout		2,514	37.7	–5.6
Registered electors		6,664		
Liberal Democrats hold				
Green hold				

=== Berinsfield ===
Berinsfield
Party	Candidate	Votes	%	±%
Green	Robin Bennett*	761	80.0	+20.8
Conservative	Bob Dhillon	190	20.0	–2.8
Majority		571	60.0	
Turnout		964	32.9	–4.1
Registered electors		2,928		
Green hold		Swing	▲11.8	

=== Chalgrove ===
Chalgrove
Party	Candidate	Votes	%	±%
Liberal Democrats	David Turner*	929	86.3	–0.8
Conservative	Jit Patel	147	13.7	+0.8
Majority		782	72.6	
Turnout		1,083	37.4	–5.8
Registered electors		2,895		
Liberal Democrats hold		Swing	▼0.8	

=== Chinnor ===
Chinnor (2 seats)
Party	Candidate	Votes	%	±%
Liberal Democrats	Ed Sadler	1,354	54.3	+20.5
Green	Ali Gordon-Creed	1,334	53.5	N/A
Conservative	Louise Heathcote	1,082	43.4	–4.3
Conservative	James Endean-Mills	919	36.9	–7.0
Turnout		2,492	34.9	+4.0
Registered electors		7,147		
Liberal Democrats gain from Conservative				
Green gain from Conservative				

=== Cholsey ===
Cholsey (2 seats)
Party	Candidate	Votes	%	±%
Liberal Democrats	Anne-Marie Simpson*	1,634	53.4	+11.0
Liberal Democrats	Ben Manning	1,387	45.3	N/A
Independent	Sue Roberts	912	29.8	N/A
Conservative	Jane Murphy*	808	26.4	–18.8
Conservative	Paul Jackson	697	22.8	–14.0
SDP	Kyn Pomlett	188	6.1	N/A
Turnout		3,059	42.1	+3.3
Registered electors		7,264		
Liberal Democrats hold				
Liberal Democrats gain from Conservative				

=== Didcot North East ===
Didcot North East (3 seats)
Party	Candidate	Votes	%	±%
Liberal Democrats	David Rouane*	1,471	55.7	+29.9
Liberal Democrats	Andrew Tinsley	1,237	46.9	+14.9
Liberal Democrats	Zia Mohammed	1,213	45.9	+20.4
Conservative	Andrea Warren*	739	28.0	+4.0
Conservative	Alan Thompson*	731	27.7	+5.5
Conservative	Annah Francisco	665	25.2	+4.2
Labour	Craig Wilson	548	20.8	–0.1
Labour	George Ryall	493	18.7	+3.6
Labour	Phil Wheeler	425	16.1	+2.3
Turnout		2,640	33.4	–1.7
Registered electors		7,894		
Liberal Democrats hold				
Liberal Democrats gain from Independent				
Liberal Democrats hold				

=== Didcot South ===
Didcot South (3 seats)
Party	Candidate	Votes	%	±%
Labour Co-op	Mocky Khan*	1,237	45.9	+8.6
Labour Co-op	Denise Macdonald	1,056	39.2	+6.7
Labour Co-op	Axel Macdonald*	926	34.3	+2.9
Conservative	Anthony Dearlove	765	28.4	–1.8
Green	Sarah Nohre	702	26.0	–4.8
Liberal Democrats	Jim Loder	635	23.6	–5.0
Conservative	Tom Wiltshire	611	22.7	–5.0
Conservative	Thomas Skuse	590	21.9	–2.0
Liberal Democrats	Hugh Macdonald	500	18.5	–9.7
SDP	Owen Edwards	327	12.1	N/A
Reform	Peter Shields	106	3.9	N/A
Turnout		2,696	28.4	+0.4
Registered electors		9,492		
Labour Co-op hold				
Labour Co-op hold				
Labour Co-op hold				

=== Didcot West ===
Didcot West (2 seats)
Party	Candidate	Votes	%	±%
Conservative	Ian Snowdon*	791	41.2	+0.5
Liberal Democrats	Tony Worgan	630	32.8	+6.2
Green	Adam Grindey	577	30.1	+2.3
Conservative	Lee Marsden	574	29.9	–3.4
Labour	James Broadbent	566	29.5	–2.0
Labour	Nick Hards	509	26.5	+0.2
Turnout		1,920	32.4	+3.4
Registered electors		5,933		
Conservative hold				
Liberal Democrats gain from Conservative				

=== Forest Hill and Holton ===
Forest Hill & Holton
Party	Candidate	Votes	%	±%
Liberal Democrats	Tim Bearder*	837	71.9	+15.7
Conservative	Greg Flynn	327	28.1	–5.9
Majority		510	43.8	
Turnout		1,189	43.3	+1.9
Registered electors		2,749		
Liberal Democrats hold		Swing	▲10.8	

=== Garsington and Horspath ===
Garsington & Horspath
Party	Candidate	Votes	%	±%
Liberal Democrats	Sam James-Lawrie	414	38.9	+15.9
Conservative	Fiona Ardern	257	24.1	–25.9
Independent	Sue Lawson	242	22.7	N/A
Labour	Stuart Macbeth	109	10.2	–4.3
Green	James Meyer-Bejdl	43	4.0	–8.5
Majority		157	14.8	
Turnout		1,068	37.8	+3.0
Registered electors		2,828		
Liberal Democrats gain from Conservative		Swing	▲20.9	

=== Goring ===
Goring
Party	Candidate	Votes	%	±%
Liberal Democrats	Maggie Filipova-Rivers*	1,098	73.3	+27.3
Conservative	Kevin Bulmer	400	26.7	–12.5
Majority		698	46.6	
Turnout		1,520	48.1	+4.4
Registered electors		3,162		
Liberal Democrats hold		Swing	▲19.9	

=== Haseley Brook ===
Haseley Brook
Party	Candidate	Votes	%	±%
Liberal Democrats	Georgina Heritage	741	59.7	+15.3
Conservative	Richard Newman	501	40.3	–6.5
Majority		240	19.4	
Turnout		1,250	37.6	–1.0
Registered electors		3,322		
Liberal Democrats gain from Conservative		Swing	▲10.9	

=== Henley-on-Thames ===
Henley-on-Thames (3 seats)
Party	Candidate	Votes	%	±%
Henley Residents	Stefan Gawrysiak*	1,934	59.7	–1.8
Henley Residents	Ken Arlett*	1,652	51.0	–2.4
Henley Residents	Kellie Hinton*	1,557	48.0	–6.3
Conservative	Lorraine Hillier	1,014	31.3	+0.6
Conservative	Dave Adkins	793	24.5	–3.6
Green	Helen Fraser	730	22.5	N/A
Conservative	Hugh Legh	664	20.5	–3.7
Liberal Democrats	John Powell	612	18.9	+6.3
Turnout		3,241	34.3	–6.2
Registered electors		9,444		
Henley Residents hold				
Henley Residents hold				
Henley Residents hold				

=== Kidmore End and Whitchurch ===
Kidmore End & Whitchurch
Party	Candidate	Votes	%	±%
Green	Peter Dragonetti*	717	62.5	N/A
Conservative	Jim Donahue	430	37.5	+12.9
Majority		287	25.0	
Turnout		1,145	40.3	–0.4
Registered electors		2,840		
Green gain from Independent		Swing	N/A	

Dragonetti had previously stood as an independent, but was re-elected to the seat this time as a Green Party councillor.

=== Sandford and the Wittenhams ===
Sandford & the Wittenhams
Party	Candidate	Votes	%	±%
Green	Sam Casey-Rerhaye*	895	74.0	+0.6
Conservative	Edwin Samu	315	26.0	–0.6
Majority		580	48.0	
Turnout		1,225	39.0	–4.9
Registered electors		3,144		
Green hold		Swing	▲0.6	

=== Sonning Common ===
Sonning Common (2 seats)
Party	Candidate	Votes	%	±%
Liberal Democrats	Leigh Rawlins*	1,250	55.4	+30.5
Liberal Democrats	Mike Giles	1,135	50.3	N/A
Conservative	David Bartholomew*	979	43.4	–0.4
Conservative	Bruce Harrison	902	39.9	+7.5
Turnout		2,258	39.0	–1.0
Registered electors		5,788		
Liberal Democrats gain from Independent				
Liberal Democrats gain from Conservative				

Rawlins was elected in 2019 as an independent

=== Thame ===
Thame (3 seats)
Party	Candidate	Votes	%	±%
Liberal Democrats	Kate Gregory*	1,943	57.7	+14.7
Liberal Democrats	David Bretherton*	1,939	57.6	+15.2
Liberal Democrats	Pieter-Paul Barker*	1,862	55.3	+22.1
Conservative	David Dodds	1,093	32.5	+4.5
Conservative	William Hall	793	23.6	–4.0
Conservative	Dylan Thomas	765	22.7	–4.3
Labour	Steven Hartridge	728	21.6	+7.2
Turnout		3,366	34.1	–1.3
Registered electors		9,872		
Liberal Democrats hold				
Liberal Democrats hold				
Liberal Democrats hold				

=== Wallingford ===
Wallingford (2 seats)
Party	Candidate	Votes	%	±%
Green	James Barlow	2,032	76.4	+25.2
Liberal Democrats	Katharine Keats-Rohan	1,762	66.2	+26.2
Conservative	Adrian Lloyd	609	22.9	–0.3
Conservative	Chidinma Okolo	363	13.6	–8.8
Turnout		2,660	41.5	+2.2
Registered electors		6,412		
Green hold				
Liberal Democrats hold				

=== Watlington ===
Watlington
Party	Candidate	Votes	%	±%
Liberal Democrats	Freddie Van Mierlo	916	69.6	+21.1
Conservative	Harry Petano-Heathcote	400	30.4	–21.1
Majority		516	39.2	
Turnout		1,330	40.9	–1.1
Registered electors		3,255		
Liberal Democrats gain from Conservative		Swing	▲21.1	

=== Wheatley ===
Wheatley
Party	Candidate	Votes	%	±%
Liberal Democrats	Alexandrine Kantor*	774	66.6	+2.4
Conservative	Lizzie Tully	389	33.4	+7.3
Majority		385	33.2	
Turnout		1,179	36.1	+0.2
Registered electors		3,270		
Liberal Democrats hold		Swing	▼2.5	

=== Woodcote and Rotherfield ===
Woodcote & Rotherfield (2 seats)
Party	Candidate	Votes	%	±%
Green	Jo Robb*	1,529	58.2	+16.0
Green	James Norman	1,387	52.8	+13.2
Conservative	Julian Kingsbury	1,028	39.1	–10.3
Conservative	Pauline Vahey	902	34.3	–4.5
Reform	David Carpin	151	5.8	N/A
Turnout		2,626	40.2	+4.6
Registered electors		6,527		
Green hold				
Green gain from Conservative				

== Changes 2023-2027 ==
=== By-elections ===
==== Cholsey ====
Cholsey by-election: 4 December 2024
Party	Candidate	Votes	%	±%
Liberal Democrats	Crispin Topping	949	62.2	+16.1
Conservative	Alan Thompson	362	23.7	+0.9
SDP	Kyn Pomlett	116	7.6	+2.3
Labour	Jim Broadbent	71	4.7	N/A
Independent	Karen Shoobridge	28	1.8	N/A
Majority		587	38.5	N/A
Turnout		1,533	20.5	–21.6
Registered electors		7,481		
Liberal Democrats hold		Swing	▲7.6	

Wheatley

Wheatley by-election: 1 May 2025
Party	Candidate	Votes	%	±%
Liberal Democrats	Peter Ramsdale	573	45.6	−21
Conservative	Daniel Masters	428	34.1	+1.2
Green	Amanda Rowe-Jones	148	11.8	N/A
Labour	Craig Wilson	79	6.3	N/A
Majority		145	11.5	−24.6
Turnout		1,256	38.2	+2.1
Registered electors		3,292		
Liberal Democrats hold		Swing	▼9.9	

Watlington

Watlington by-election: 1 May 2025
Party	Candidate	Votes	%	±%
Liberal Democrats	Benjamin Higgins	679	45.7	−23.9
Conservative	Richard Riley	585	39.4	+9
Green	Lucie Ponsford	174	11.7	N/A
Labour	Nicholas Palmer	34	2.3	N/A
Majority		94	6.4	−32.8
Turnout		1485	43	+6.9
Registered electors		3,478		
Liberal Democrats hold		Swing	▼16.5	
