= Henley Residents Group =

- Abbreviation: HRG
- Leader: Gill Dodds
- Founded: 1989; 37 years ago
- Registered: 5 September 2001; 24 years ago
- Headquarters: Henley-on-Thames
- Henley Town Council: 11 / 16
- South Oxfordshire District Council: 3 / 36
- Oxfordshire County Council: 1 / 63

Website
- hrg.org.uk

Henley Residents Group (HRG) is a local political party in Oxfordshire, England.

== Formation ==
The group was formed in 1989 in to oppose a planned town centre development in Henley, Oxfordshire, in which Waitrose planned to increase the size of its store, demolishing the town's Regal Cinema. HRG campaigned against this and, unhappy at the Conservative Party's support for the scheme, stood for election in Henley in the 1991 local elections, winning eight seats on Henley Town Council, and three seats on South Oxfordshire District council. The plan was subsequently modified to include a replacement three screen cinema.

== Elections ==
HRG had a majority on Henley Town Council for 22 out of the 27 years between 1991 and 2018.

The party lost control of the town council in the 2015 election.

After two by-election successes in 2017, HRG had 8 out of 16 town council seats, with the rest being held by the Conservatives.

At the 2017 Oxfordshire County Council election, HRG gained the Henley-on-Thames seat from the Conservative party, giving the party its first county councillor.

At the 2019 South Oxfordshire District Council election, the party won all three Henley seats on the district council: holding one seat and gaining the other two from the Conservatives. They also won 12 of the 16 seats available at the town council election, with every candidate they stood being elected.

At the 2021 county council election, the party held its seat, increasing its vote share by 14.5% to 62.3%.

At the 2023 district council election, the party retained its three district councillors. It also won a record 13 seats on the town council.

== Beliefs ==
HRG says it supports a mixed economy, a sustainable environment and affordable housing.
