= Northey =

Northey may refer to:

Surname

- Alfred Northey (1838–1911), English clergyman and cricketer
- Andy Northey (born 1972), English rugby league and rugby union player
- Benjamin Northey (born 1970), Australian conductor
- Bill Northey (born 1959), Iowan politician, a member of the Republican Party
- Craig Northey (born 1962), Canadian musician, film and TV composer
- Edward Northey (barrister) (1652–1743), senior British barrister and politician
- Edward Northey (British Army officer), GCMG, CB (1868–1953), senior British Army officer of the First World War
- George Northey (cricketer) (1835–1906), English cricketer and soldier
- John Northey (born 1943), former Australian rules football player and coach
- Richard Northey, ONZM (born 1945), New Zealand politician
- Ron Northey (1920–1971), American professional baseball player and coach
- Sarah Northey, British silver medalist in synchronized swimming at the 1990 Commonwealth Games
- Scott Northey (born 1946), American baseball player
- William Northey (1872–1963), Canadian hockey player
- William Northey FRS (1722–1770), English politician

Middle name

- Neville Northey Burnard (1818–1878), Cornish sculptor best known for his portrait figures
- Henry Northey Hooper (1799–1865), 19th-century American manufacturer of decorative lighting, Civil War artillery, bells and chimes
- William Northey Hooper (1809–1878), co-founder in 1835 of Ladd & Co., the first large scale sugar producer in Hawaii
- Frank Northey Sleeman or Frank Sleeman (1915–2000), Lord Mayor of Brisbane from 1976 to 1982
- Lewis Northey Tappan (1831–1880), abolitionist, politician, and Colorado pioneer and entrepreneur

Geography

- Northey Island, island in the estuary of the River Blackwater, Essex, England
- Northeye, an abandoned medieval settlement in East Sussex, England

== See also ==
- Norther
- Northerly
- Northlea
- Northney
- Northway (disambiguation)
