= Northway =

Northway may refer to:

== Places ==
Canada

- Camp Northway, the oldest summer camp for girls in Canada

United Kingdom

- Northway, Devon, England
- Northway, Gloucestershire, England
- Northway, Oxford, England
- Northway, Somerset, England
- Northway, Swansea, Wales

United States

- Northway, Alaska, a village
- Northway Junction, Alaska, a village
- Northway Village, Alaska, a village
- Northway Mall, a shopping mall in Anchorage, Alaska
- Northway Shopping Center, a shopping mall in Colonie, New York
- The Shoppes at Northway, a shopping mall in Ross Township, Pennsylvania
- Adirondack Northway, the segment of Interstate 87 between Albany, New York, and the Canada–US border

== People ==
Notable people with the Northway surname include:

- Doug Northway (born 1955), American swimmer
- Edward Northway (1901–1966), English cricketer
- Mary Louise Northway (1909–1987), Canadian psychologist
- Reginald Northway (1906–1936), Sri Lanka-born cricketer in England
- Stephen A. Northway (1833–1898), American lawyer and politician

== Other ==
- Northway Bank, a community bank in New Hampshire
- Northway Books, a British publisher specialising in books about jazz
