= 2025 Oxfordshire County Council election =

2025 English local election

- 1 May 2025

All 69 seats to Oxfordshire County Council 35 seats needed for a majority
- Turnout: 35.6% (▼4.8 pp)
	First party	Second party	Third party
Leader	Liz Leffman	Liz Brighouse	Eddie Reeves
Party	Liberal Democrats	Labour	Conservative
Leader's seat	Charlbury & Wychwood	Churchill & Lye Valley	Cropredy & Hook Norton (lost)
Last election	21 seats, 25.8%	16 seats, 21.4%	21 seats, 36.9%
Seats before	20	14	19
Seats won	36	12	10
Seat change	▲16	▼2	▼9
Popular vote	57,679	24,604	40,867
Percentage	30.1%	12.8%	21.3%
	Fourth party	Fifth party	Sixth party
Leader	Ian Middleton	Felix Bloomfield	Anne Gwinnett
Party	Green	Reform	IOA
Leader's seat	Kidlington East	Wallingford (lost)	None
Last election	3 seats, 12.0%	0 seats, 0.2%	Did not exist
Seats before	3	2	0
Seats won	7	1	1
Seat change	▲4	▼1	▲1
Popular vote	22,919	34,148	5,161
Percentage	12.0%	17.8%	2.7%
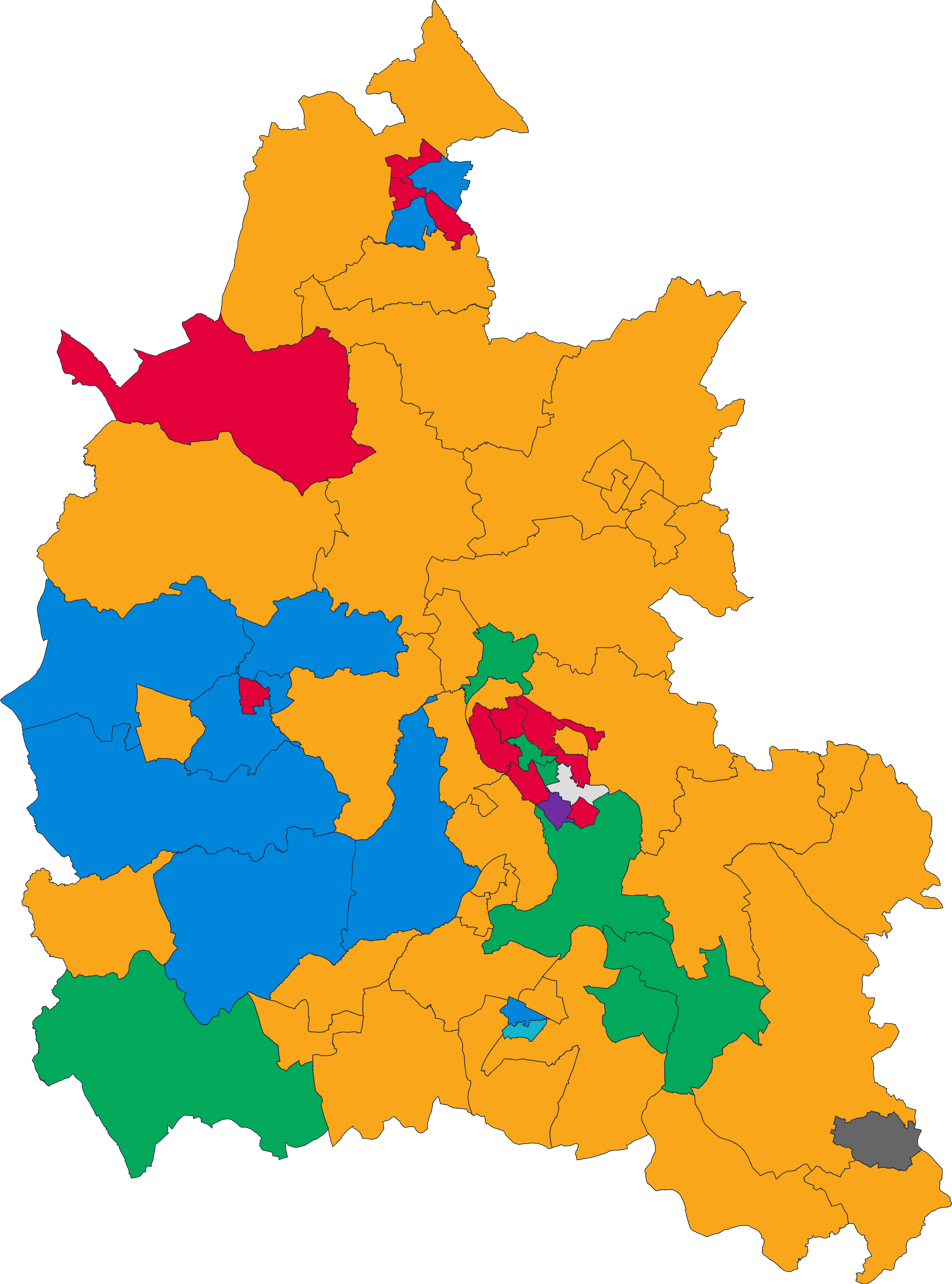
- Map showing the results of the 2025 Oxfordshire County Council election

- Council composition after the election
Leader before election
Liz Leffman
Liberal Democrat
No overall control
Leader after election
Liz Leffman
Liberal Democrats

The 2025 Oxfordshire County Council election was held on 1 May 2025 to elect members to Oxfordshire County Council in Oxfordshire, England. All 69 seats were elected. This was on the same day as a by-election for the Oxford City Council ward of Headington Hill and Northway, as well as other local elections nationwide. The council had been under no overall control prior to the election, being run by a Liberal Democrat and Green Party coalition, led by Liberal Democrat councillor Liz Leffman. The election saw the Liberal Democrats win overall control of the council for the first time.

== Background ==
The council had been under no overall control since 2013. Following the previous full council election in 2021, a coalition of the Liberal Democrats, Labour, and the Green Party formed to run the council, led by Liberal Democrat councillor Liz Leffman. Labour withdrew from the coalition in September 2023, after which the Liberal Democrats and Greens ran the council as a minority administration.

The 2025 election was held under new ward boundaries.

== Previous council composition ==
After 2021 election		Before 2025 election	
Party	Seats	Party	Seats
Liberal Democrats	21	Liberal Democrats	20
Conservative	21	Conservative-Independent Alliance	19
Labour	16	Labour	14
Green	3	Green	3
Henley Residents	1	Henley Residents	1
Independent	1	Independent	6

=== Changes 2021–2025 ===
- November 2022: Hannah Banfield (Labour) leaves party to sit as an independent
- January 2023: Michele Paule (Labour) resigns - by-election held March 2023
- March 2023: Trish Elphinstone (Labour) wins by-election
- September 2023: Damian Haywood (Labour) leaves party to sit as an independent
- December 2023: Sally Povolotsky (Liberal Democrats) leaves party to sit as an independent
- March 2024: Kevin Bulmer (Conservative) suspended from party
- May 2024: Richard Webber (Liberal Democrats) resigns - by-election held June 2024; Jane Murphy (Conservative) leaves party to sit as an independent
- June 2024: Peter Stevens (Liberal Democrats) wins by-election
- March 2025: Felix Bloomfield and Kevin Bulmer (both Conservative) join Reform UK.

== Summary ==
=== Election result ===
2025 Oxfordshire County Council election
Party	Candidates	Seats	Gains	Losses	Net gain/loss	Seats %	Votes %	Votes	+/−
Liberal Democrats	68	36			+16	52.2	30.08	57,679	
Labour	69	12			-2	17.4	12.83	24,604	
Conservative	69	10			-9	14.5	21.31	40,867	
Green	69	7			+4	10.1	11.95	22,919	
Reform	64	1			+1	1.4	17.81	34,148	
Independent	13	1			0	1.4	2.32	4,448	
IOA	9	1			+1	1.4	2.69	5,161	N/A
TUSC	7				0		0.09	173	
Animal Welfare	1				0		0.01	10	
Henley Residents	1	1			0	1.4	0.77	1,483	
Heritage	1				0		0.01	15	
Monster Raving Loony	1				0		0.01	37	
Oxford Community Socialists	1				0		0.08	147	
SDP	1				0		0.05	90	

== Aftermath ==
The Liberal Democrats won a majority of the seats at the elections. It was the first time the party had won a majority on the council. At the subsequent annual council meeting on 20 May 2025, a new cabinet consisting entirely of Liberal Democrats was appointed, with Liz Leffman retaining her position as leader of the council.

In May 2026, Cllr Leffman announced her intention to step down as council leader being replaced by Cllr Bearder later that same month.

== Changes in representation from May 2025 ==
- In May 2026 Lib Dem Cllr Higgins representing Watlington & Rotherfield left the Lib Dems to sit as an independent.
- In May 2026 Lib Dem Cllr Cotter representing Bicester South left the Lib Dems to sit as an independent.
- In June 2026 Independent Cllr Higgins representing Watlington & Rotherfield rejoined the Lib Dems.
- In July 2026, Lib Dem Cllr Boucher-Giles representing Chesterton and Launton resigned from the Council saying his family was moving abroad.
- Dr James Hartley won the subsequent by-election held 3 Sep 2026 with an increased majority (8.8%) over the Conservatives.

== Candidates by division ==
The Statements of Persons Nominated details the candidates confirmed to be standing in each division. An asterisk (*) indicates an incumbent councillor seeking re-election.

=== Cherwell ===
==== District summary ====
Cherwell district summary
Party	Seats	+/-	Votes	%	+/-
Liberal Democrats	10	▲9	11,113	26.3	+10.7
Labour	3	▲1	5,364	12.7	–10.2
Conservative	2	▼7	10,611	25.1	–23.3
Green	1	Steady	3,763	8.9	-0.6
Reform	0	Steady	9,215	21.8	+21.6
Independent	0	▼1	1,314	3.11	-0.3
Total	16	▲2	42,241		

Adderbury, Bloxham & Bodicote
Party	Candidate	Votes	%	±%
Liberal Democrats	David Hingley	1,156	35.5	
Conservative	Adam Nell	938	28.8	
Reform	Paul Jeffreys	786	24.1	
Labour	Dom Vaitkus	233	7.2	
Green	Linda Ward	143	4.4	
Majority		218	6.7	
Turnout		3,256	39.5	
Registered electors		8,265		
Liberal Democrats win (new seat)				

Banbury Calthorpe
Party	Candidate	Votes	%	±%
Labour	Isabel Creed	721	31.5	−0.9
Conservative	Ian Harwood	627	27.4	−20.6
Reform	Michael Wardle	535	23.4	New
Green	Samuel Burnett	221	9.7	−3.7
Liberal Democrats	Mark Chivers	183	8.0	+1.8
Majority		94	4.1	
Turnout		2,287	31.9	−5.1
Registered electors		7,186		
Labour gain from Conservative		Swing		

Banbury Easington
Party	Candidate	Votes	%	±%
Conservative	Kieron Mallon*	1,103	41.4	−16.2
Reform	John Brown	661	24.8	New
Labour Co-op	Anne Cullen	552	19.6	+1.0
Green	Philip Holt	162	6.1	−5.4
Liberal Democrats	Rob Pattenden	155	5.8	−6.6
Independent	Phil Richards	63	2.4	New
Majority		442	16.6	−22.4
Turnout		2666	39.6	
Registered electors		6,762		
Conservative hold		Swing		

Banbury Grimsbury & Castle
Party	Candidate	Votes	%	±%
Conservative	Paul Sargent	713	31.7	−2.2
Labour Co-op	Rebecca Biegel	696	30.9	−20.3
Independent	Cassi Bellingham	368	16.4	New
Liberal Democrats	Sophie Parker-Manuel	253	11.2	+5.3
Green	Karl Kwiatkowski	219	9.7	+0.7
Majority		17	0.8	
Turnout		2,294	26.4	−2.5
Registered electors		8,682		
Conservative gain from Independent				

Banbury Hardwick
Party	Candidate	Votes	%	±%
Labour Co-op	Andrew Crichton	567	29.5	−11.2
Reform	Stephen Hartley	512	26.6	+24.0
Conservative	Oliver Perera	430	22.4	−22.4
Liberal Democrats	Christophe Aramini	170	8.8	+4.6
Green	Chris Nelson	146	7.6	−0.1
Independent	Simon Garrett	98	5.1	New
Majority		55	2.9	
Turnout		1,923	23.3	−7.3
Registered electors		8,281		
Labour Co-op gain from Conservative		Swing		

Banbury Ruscote
Party	Candidate	Votes	%	±%
Labour Co-op	Mark Cherry*	847	36.5	−19.3
Reform	Peter Burns	712	30.7	New
Conservative	Taraji Ogunnubi	368	15.8	−22.0
Green	Ruthi Brandt	151	6.5	New
Liberal Democrats	Mark Petterson	125	5.4	−0.9
Independent	Julie Battison	119	5.1	New
Majority		135	5.8	−12.2
Turnout		2,322	26.1	−1.4
Registered electors		8,935		
Labour Co-op hold		Swing		

Bicester East
Party	Candidate	Votes	%	±%
Liberal Democrats	Sean Gaul	858	34.0	
Conservative	Sam Holland	728	28.9	
Reform	Andrew O'Gorman	578	22.9	
Labour	Jane Clements	190	7.5	
Green	Damien Maguire	167	6.6	
Majority		130	5.1	
Turnout		2,521	34.1	
Registered electors		7,403		
Liberal Democrats win (new seat)				

Bicester North
Party	Candidate	Votes	%	±%
Liberal Democrats	Matt Webb	951	36.3	+16.2
Reform	Alan Thomas	693	26.5	New
Conservative	Mitch Lee	588	22.5	−30.5
Labour	Babatunde Aribisala	204	7.8	−12.3
Green	Amanda Maguire	183	7.0	−6.8
Majority		258	9.8	
Turnout		2,619	32.5	
Registered electors		8,065		
Liberal Democrats gain from Conservative		Swing		

Bicester South
Party	Candidate	Votes	%	±%
Liberal Democrats	Nicholas Cotter	946	52.4	
Reform	Jeff Rigby	427	23.7	
Conservative	Lynn Pratt	234	13.0	
Labour	James Daulton	105	5.8	
Green	Robin Winslow	93	5.2	
Majority		519	28.7	
Turnout		1,805	29.2	
Registered electors		6,186		
Liberal Democrats win (new seat)				

Bicester West
Party	Candidate	Votes	%	±%
Liberal Democrats	John Shiri	669	29.7	+21.3
Independent	Les Sibley*	666	29.6	−22.0
Reform	George-Aurelian Popeseu	496	20.8	New
Conservative	Jake Whittingham	248	11.0	−13.8
Labour	Arjun Bais	121	5.4	−9.7
Green	Paul Radford	77	3.4	New
Majority		3	0.1	
Turnout		2,250	28.9	+2.11
Registered electors		7,793		
Liberal Democrats gain from Independent		Swing		

Chesterton & Launton
Party	Candidate	Votes	%	±%
Liberal Democrats	William Boucher-Giles	935	32.9	+24.5
Conservative	Sandy Dallimore	806	28.3	−37.1
Reform	Ian Hodgson	760	26.7	New
Green	John O'Regan	188	6.6	−5.3
Labour	Russell Hewer	156	5.5	−8.9
Majority		129	4.6	
Turnout		2,845	37.8	
Registered electors		7,535		
Liberal Democrats gain from Conservative		Swing		

Cropredy & Hook Norton
Party	Candidate	Votes	%	±%
Liberal Democrats	Christopher Brant	1,401	35.9	+22.4
Conservative	Eddie Reeves*	1,348	34.5	−28.2
Reform	Lynda Martin	740	19.0	New
Labour	Helen Oldfield	261	6.7	−17.1
Green	Jenny Tamblyn	154	3.9	New
Majority		53	1.4	
Turnout		3,904	46.6	
Registered electors		8,393		
Liberal Democrats gain from Conservative		Swing		

Deddington
Party	Candidate	Votes	%	±%
Liberal Democrats	Gareth Epps	1,050	34.1	+7.2
Conservative	Arash Fatemian*	870	28.3	−27.1
Reform	Paul Yoward	637	20.7	New
Labour	Sian Tohill-Martin	273	8.9	−8.8
Green	Aaron Bliss	249	8.1	New
Majority		180	5.8	
Turnout		3,079	39.8	
Registered electors		7,765		
Liberal Democrats gain from Conservative		Swing		

Kidlington East
Party	Candidate	Votes	%	±%
Green	Ian Middleton*	998	38.8	
Reform	Daniel Reeve	586	22.8	
Liberal Democrats	Gabriel Schenk	403	15.7	
Conservative	Zoe McLernon	399	15.5	
Labour	Lynne Parsons	184	7.2	
Majority		412	16.0	
Turnout		2,570	36.1	
Registered electors		7,147		
Green win (new seat)				

Kidlington North & Otmoor
Party	Candidate	Votes	%	±%
Liberal Democrats	Laura Gordon	1,275	40.4	
Conservative	Andrew Payne	818	25.9	
Reform	Tom Burgess	719	22.8	
Green	Fin MacEwan	183	5.8	
Labour	Naomi Karslake	163	5.2	
Majority		457	14.5	
Turnout		3,158	42.0	
Registered electors		7,531		
Liberal Democrats win (new seat)				

Kidlington West
Party	Candidate	Votes	%	±%
Liberal Democrats	Lesley McLean	556	30.2	
Green	Fiona Mawson	429	23.3	
Conservative	Nigel Simpson*	393	21.3	
Reform	Hamish McLay	373	20.2	
Labour	John Tanner	91	4.9	
Majority		127	6.9	
Turnout		1,842	37.7	
Registered electors		4,899		
Liberal Democrats win (new seat)				

=== Oxford ===
==== District summary ====
Oxford district summary
Party	Seats	+/-	Votes	%	+/-
Labour	7	▼4	10,920	31.0	–14.7
Green	2	▲2	6,338	18.0	-0.8
Liberal Democrats	2	▼1	5,358	15.2	-2.8
IOA	1	▲1	5,161	14.6	New
Independent	1	▲1	2,061	5.8	+2.3
Reform	0	Steady	3,332	9.5	New
Conservative	0	Steady	1,727	4.9	–8.8
TUSC	0	Steady	173	0.5	New
Oxford Community Socialists	0	Steady	147	0.4	New
Animal Welfare	0	Steady	10	<0.1	New
Total	13	▼1	35,247		

Bartlemas
Party	Candidate	Votes	%	±%
Green	Emily Kerr	1,367	48.6	
Labour Co-op	Thomas Boyd	635	22.6	
IOA	Zaheer Iqbal	461	16.4	
Reform	Claudia Davies	136	4.8	
Liberal Democrats	Tony Brett	131	4.7	
Conservative	Simon Bazley	65	2.3	
TUSC	Hannah Chapman	20	0.7	
Majority		732	26.0	
Turnout		2,815	31.5	
Registered electors		8,970		
Green win (new seat)				

Barton, Sandhills & Risinghurst
Party	Candidate	Votes	%	±%
Labour Co-op	Glynis Phillips*	647	36.0	−10.9
Reform	Malan Armson	448	24.9	New
Conservative	Louise Brown	205	11.4	−5.4
Liberal Democrats	Richard Whelan	196	10.9	−4.3
Green	Ray Hitchins	156	8.7	−2.9
Oxford Community Socialists	Jabu Nala-Hartley	147	8.2	New
Majority		199	11.1	−19.1
Turnout		1,799	28.2	−8.7
Registered electors		6,418		
Labour Co-op hold		Swing		

Churchill & Lye Valley
Party	Candidate	Votes	%	±%
Labour Co-op	Liz Brighouse*	834	34.3	−27.1
IOA	Ajaz Rehman	629	25.9	New
Reform	Jakub Zagdanski	388	16.0	New
Green	Duncan Watts	253	10.4	−2.5
Conservative	Mark Bhagwandin	163	6.7	−11.8
Liberal Democrats	Daniel Levy	137	5.6	−1.7
TUSC	James Giraldi	28	1.2	New
Majority		205	8.4	−34.5
Turnout		2,432	27.9	−0.2
Registered electors		8,767		
Labour Co-op hold		Swing		

Cowley
Party	Candidate	Votes	%	±%
Independent	Saj Malik	1,299	43.1	New
Labour	Mhairi Beken	704	23.3	−31.0
Green	James Thorniley	420	13.9	−3.3
Liberal Democrats	George Busby	249	8.3	+4.8
Reform	Elizabeth Fielder	224	7.4	New
Conservative	Fay Sims	65	2.2	−8.4
Independent	Pat Mylvaganam	29	1.0	New
TUSC	James Morbin	25	0.8	New
Majority		595	19.8	−17.3
Turnout		3,015	34.1	−7.2
Registered electors		8,868		
Independent gain from Labour		Swing		

Headington & Quarry
Party	Candidate	Votes	%	±%
Liberal Democrats	Roz Smith*	1,451	44.2	−1.3
Independent	Peter West	659	20.1	New
Labour	Sumukh Kaul	585	17.8	−18.5
Green	Stephen Hurt	283	8.6	+1.1
Reform	Jason Surrage	194	5.9	New
Conservative	Jennifer Jackson	80	2.4	−8.9
TUSC	Agnieszka Kowalska	30	0.9	New
Majority		792	24.1	+14.9
Turnout		3,282	41.4	−6.0
Registered electors		7,938		
Liberal Democrats hold		Swing		

Isis
Party	Candidate	Votes	%	±%
Labour Co-op	Brad Baines*	1,346	47.0	−6.3
Green	Neil Doig	842	29.4	+6.0
Reform	Nick Manners-Bell	286	10.0	New
Liberal Democrats	Rick Tanner	203	7.1	−4.8
Conservative	Amy Campbell	155	5.4	−5.5
TUSC	James Fernandes	33	1.2	New
Majority		504	17.6	−12.3
Turnout		2,865	38.3	−8.9
Registered electors		7,536		
Labour hold		Swing		

Jericho & Osney
Party	Candidate	Votes	%	±%
Labour	Susanna Pressel*	1,131	44.0	−14.6
Green	Chris Goodall	817	31.8	+12.4
Liberal Democrats	John Howson*	324	12.6	−0.1
Reform	Paul McClory	172	6.7	New
Conservative	Patricia Jones	126	4.9	−4.4
Majority		314	12.2	−27.0
Turnout		2,570	34.6	−7.6
Registered electors		7,472		
Labour hold		Swing		

Leys
Party	Candidate	Votes	%	±%
Labour	Imade Edosomwan*	753	38.6	−24.7
Reform	Komel Schesztak	461	23.6	New
IOA	Anthony Church	384	19.7	New
Green	David Newman	109	5.6	−3.7
Conservative	Paul Sims	98	5.0	−13.6
Independent	Michael Evans	74	3.8	New
Liberal Democrats	Rosemary Morlin	72	3.7	−1.8
Majority		192	15.0	−29.7
Turnout		1,951	23.2	+0.4
Registered electors		8,484		
Labour hold		Swing		

Marston & Northway
Party	Candidate	Votes	%	±%
Labour	Mark Lygo*	1,091	35.4	−7.5
IOA	Nasreen Majeed	913	29.6	New
Green	Alistair Morris	509	16.5	−10.5
Reform	Harry Knipe-Gibbs	261	8.5	New
Conservative	Duncan Hatfield	161	5.2	−16.0
Liberal Democrats	Eleonore Vogel	117	3.8	−3.6
TUSC	Rachel Cox	30	1.0	New
Majority		178	5.8	−10.1
Turnout		3,082	36.5	−8.5
Registered electors		8,475		
Labour hold		Swing		

Parks
Party	Candidate	Votes	%	±%
Green	Emma Garnett	687	45.8	+17.1
Labour	Louise Upton	365	24.3	−21.1
IOA	Emily Scaysbrook	265	17.1	New
Liberal Democrats	Dane Comerford	71	4.7	−12.1
Reform	Anna Avila Taylor	56	3.7	New
Conservative	Harriet Dolby	40	2.7	−6.4
Animal Welfare	Gavin Ridley	10	0.7	New
TUSC	Rosie Douglas-Brown	7	0.5	New
Majority		322	21.5	+4.7
Turnout		1,501	27.5	−10.2
Registered electors		5,457		
Green gain from Labour		Swing		

Rose Hill & Littlemore
Party	Candidate	Votes	%	±%
IOA	David Henwood	1,240	38.7	New
Labour Co-op	Trish Elphinstone*	1,124	35.1	−17.2
Reform	Ben McManus	373	11.6	New
Green	David Thomas	272	8.5	−4.6
Liberal Democrats	Peter Coggins	112	3.5	−1.9
Conservative	Vinay Raniga	81	2.5	−15.1
Majority		116	3.6	−31.2
Turnout		3,202	36.3	−1.3
Registered electors		8,859		
IOA gain from Labour Co-op		Swing		

Summertown & Walton Manor
Party	Candidate	Votes	%	±%
Labour Co-op	James Fry	1,398	37.5	+3.6
Liberal Democrats	Katherine Miles	1,215	32.6	−3.9
IOA	Mark Beer	383	10.3	New
Green	Indrani Sigamany	326	8.7	−5.1
Conservative	Penelope Lenon	262	7.0	−8.7
Reform	John Lord	147	3.9	New
Majority		183	4.9	
Turnout		3,731	44.6	
Registered electors		8,377		
Labour Co-op gain from Liberal Democrats		Swing		

Wolvercote & Cutteslowe
Party	Candidate	Votes	%	±%
Liberal Democrats	Andrew Gant*	1,080	36.0	−14.2
IOA	Inga Nicholas	886	29.5	New
Green	Philippa Lanchbery	317	10.6	−4.2
Labour	Charlotte Vinnicombe	307	10.2	−8.4
Conservative	Daniel Campbell	226	7.5	−8.9
Reform	Melinda Tilley	186	6.2	New
Majority		194	6.5	
Turnout		3,002	41.5	
Registered electors		7,257		
Liberal Democrats hold		Swing		

=== South Oxfordshire ===
==== District summary ====
South Oxfordshire district summary
Party	Seats	+/-	Votes	%	+/-
Liberal Democrats	9	▲5	14,287	29.7	+6.4
Green	3	▲1	6,430	13.4	-1.9
Conservative	1	▼5	9,737	20.3	–19.4
Reform	1	▲1	8,695	18.1	New
Henley Residents	1	Steady	1,483	3.1	-1.4
Labour	0	Steady	2,240	4.7	–8.7
SDP	0	Steady	90	0.2	+0.1
Monster Raving Loony	0	Steady	37	0.1	New
Total	15	▲2	48,029		

Benson & Crowmarsh
Party	Candidate	Votes	%	±%
Green	Gavin McLaughlin	1,070	33.8	New
Liberal Democrats	Julius Parker	930	29.4	−11.5
Reform	Pete Longman	579	18.3	New
Conservative	Julian Kingsbury	514	16.2	−25.2
Labour	Nick Walker	73	2.3	−13.4
Majority		140	4.4	
Turnout		3166	40.1	
Registered electors		7,917		
Green gain from Conservative		Swing		

Berinsfield & Garsington
Party	Candidate	Votes	%	±%
Green	Robin Jones*	703	36.8	−19.8
Reform	Julie Simpson	586	30.7	New
Conservative	Dylan Thomas	282	14.8	−20.8
Liberal Democrats	Ed Sadler	258	13.5	New
Labour	Oziegbe-Orhuwa Odiase	81	4.2	−3.5
Majority		117	6.1	
Turnout		1910	32.4	
Registered electors		5,905		
Green hold		Swing		

Chalgrove & Thame West
Party	Candidate	Votes	%	±%
Liberal Democrats	Judith Edwards	1,222	45.0	
Reform	Neil Garrod	696	25.7	
Conservative	Caroline Newton	617	22.7	
Green	Nick Breakspear	116	4.3	
Labour Co-op	Martin Stott	62	2.3	
Majority		526	19.3	
Turnout		2713	27.3	
Registered electors		7,275		
Liberal Democrats win (new seat)				

Chinnor
Party	Candidate	Votes	%	±%
Liberal Democrats	Georgina Heritage	965	31.8	
Green	Helena Richards	780	25.7	
Reform	Paul Clewlow	726	23.9	
Conservative	Paul Harrison	515	17.0	
Labour	Siobhan Lancaster	52	1.7	
Majority		185	6.1	
Turnout		3038	38.4	
Registered electors		7,934		
Liberal Democrats win (new seat)				

Cholsey & The Hagbournes
Party	Candidate	Votes	%	±%
Liberal Democrats	Johnny Hope-Smith	1,447	45.0	
Reform	Kieran Collins	678	21.1	
Conservative	Luke King	556	17.3	
Green	Helena Nunan	277	17.3	
Labour	Jim Broadbent	169	5.3	
SDP	Kyn Pomlett	90	2.8	
Majority		769	23.9	
Turnout		3217	36.1	
Registered electors		8,922		
Liberal Democrats win (new seat)				

Didcot Ladygrove
Party	Candidate	Votes	%	±%
Liberal Democrats	Tony Worgan	979	43.4	+3.1
Conservative	Andrea Warren	463	20.5	−17.7
Reform	Prem Kiran	432	19.1	New
Green	Adam Grindey	203	9.0	New
Labour Co-op	Denise MacDonald	181	8.0	−13.5
Majority		516	22.9	
Turnout		2258	32.4	
Registered electors		6,983		
Liberal Democrats hold		Swing		

Didcot South
Party	Candidate	Votes	%	±%
Reform	Hao Du	842	32.2	
Labour Co-op	Mocky Khan	627	23.9	
Liberal Democrats	Peter Kirby-Harris	550	21.0	
Conservative	Alan Thompson	400	15.3	
Green	Peter Sims	199	7.6	
Majority		215	8.3	
Turnout		2618	32.2	
Registered electors		8,147		
Reform win (new seat)				

Didcot West
Party	Candidate	Votes	%	±%
Conservative	Ian Snowdon*	1,192	48.5	−0.3
Reform	Dan Jackson	401	16.3	New
Labour Co-op	Laura Greatrex	380	15.5	−22.3
Liberal Democrats	Michael Pighills	361	14.7	+1.3
Green	Carys Morris	122	5.0	New
Majority		791	32.2	+21.2
Turnout		2456	33.9	
Registered electors		7,244		
Conservative hold		Swing		

Goring & Woodcote
Party	Candidate	Votes	%	±%
Liberal Democrats	Maggie Filipova-Rivers	1,611	46.7	+5.4
Conservative	Jim Donahue	946	27.4	−16.9
Reform	Doug Hulbert	586	17.0	New
Green	Caroline Pierrepont	245	7.1	New
Labour	Isobel Hollingsworth	61	1.8	−12.6
Majority		665	19.3	
Turnout		3449	42.4	
Registered electors		8,141		
Liberal Democrats gain from Conservative		Swing		

Henley
Party	Candidate	Votes	%	±%
Henley Residents	Stefan Gawrysiak*	1,483	50.1	−12.2
Conservative	James Cracknell	788	26.6	+0.8
Reform	John Halsall	421	14.2	New
Green	Elisabeth Geake	186	6.3	New
Labour	Stephen Harwood	81	2.7	−6.0
Majority		695	23.5	−13.0
Turnout		2959	37.1	
Registered electors		7,989		
Henley Residents hold		Swing		

Sonning Common & Henley South
Party	Candidate	Votes	%	±%
Liberal Democrats	Leigh Rawlins	1,209	41.7	New
Conservative	David Bartholomew*	933	32.2	−26.4
Reform	Martin Leach	550	19.0	New
Green	Stephen Matthews	143	4.9	−25.7
Labour	Tim Sadler	67	2.3	−6.4
Majority		276	9.5	
Turnout		2902	36.6	
Registered electors		7,945		
Liberal Democrats gain from Conservative		Swing		

Thame
Party	Candidate	Votes	%	±%
Liberal Democrats	Kate Gregory*	1,678	53.1	
Conservative	William Wilde	632	20.0	
Reform	Adrian Reynolds	552	17.5	
Green	Sue Martin-Downhill	207	6.6	
Labour	Klaudia Zaporowska	89	2.8	
Majority		1046	33.1	
Turnout		3158	34.0	
Registered electors		9,295		
Liberal Democrats win (new seat)				

Wallingford
Party	Candidate	Votes	%	±%
Green	James Barlow	1,350	42.5	−16.4
Liberal Democrats	Caroline Bucklow	806	25.3	New
Reform	Felix Bloomfield*	545	17.1	New
Conservative	Adrian Lloyd	368	11.6	−21.4
Labour	George Kneeshaw	111	3.5	−4.6
Majority		544	17.2	−8.7
Turnout		3180	40.4	
Registered electors		7,876		
Green hold		Swing		

Watlington & Rotherfield
Party	Candidate	Votes	%	±%
Liberal Democrats	Benjamin Higgins	1,000	31.3	
Conservative	Richard Newman	923	28.9	
Green	Dominic Hall	636	19.9	
Reform	Jordan Sears	537	16.8	
Labour Co-op	Kit Fotheringham	63	2.0	
Monster Raving Loony	James Bonner	37	1.2	
Majority		77	2.4	
Turnout		3196	40.5	
Registered electors		7,902		
Liberal Democrats win (new seat)				

Wheatley
Party	Candidate	Votes	%	±%
Liberal Democrats	Tim Bearder*	1,271	45.7	−14.9
Conservative	Daniel Masters	608	21.9	−8.7
Reform	Dorothy Owens	564	20.3	New
Green	Amanda Rowe-Jones	193	6.9	New
Labour	Samuel Karlin	143	5.1	−3.7
Majority		663	23.8	−6.2
Turnout		2779	39.5	
Registered electors		7,073		
Liberal Democrats hold		Swing		

=== Vale of White Horse ===
==== District summary ====
Vale of White Horse district summary
Party	Seats	+/-	Votes	%	+/-
Liberal Democrats	11	▲1	16,807	43.7	-2.7
Conservative	2	Steady	8,735	22.7	–14.3
Green	1	▲1	4,232	11.0	+4.4
Reform	0	Steady	5,343	13.9	+13.6
Labour	0	Steady	1,992	5.2	–2.9
Independent	0	Steady	892	2.3	+2.0
IOA	0	Steady	39	0.1	New
Total	14	▲2	38,452		

Abingdon East
Party	Candidate	Votes	%	±%
Liberal Democrats	Tom Greenaway	1,657	54.0	+3.0
Conservative	Vicky Jenkins	723	23.6	−7.0
Green	Aidan Reilly	532	17.3	+8.4
Labour	Moira Logie	157	5.1	−2.9
Majority		934	30.4	+10.0
Turnout		3,069	37.5	−4.1
Registered electors		7,586		
Liberal Democrats hold		Swing		

Abingdon North
Party	Candidate	Votes	%	±%
Liberal Democrats	Nathan Ley*	1,785	57.7	+6.5
Reform	Olga Sutton	564	18.2	New
Conservative	David Pope	408	13.2	−18.7
Green	Charles Couper	190	6.1	−1.0
Labour	Robert Blundell	148	4.8	−3.6
Majority		1,221	39.5	+20.2
Turnout		3,095	37.1	−6.9
Registered electors		8,350		
Liberal Democrats hold		Swing		

Abingdon South
Party	Candidate	Votes	%	±%
Liberal Democrats	Neil Fawcett*	1,214	42.3	−10.6
Independent	Christopher Cubby	728	25.3	New
Conservative	Chris Palmer	434	15.1	−19.2
Labour	Stephen Webb	253	8.8	−0.3
Green	David Tannahill	244	8.5	New
Majority		486	17.0	−1.6
Turnout		2,873	33.6	−5.0
Registered electors		8,575		
Liberal Democrats hold		Swing		

Charlton, Ardington & Hendreds
Party	Candidate	Votes	%	±%
Liberal Democrats	Jane Hanna*	1,280	47.0	
Reform	Christopher Armstrong	528	19.4	
Green	Sarah James	408	15.0	
Conservative	Patrick Wood	405	14.9	
Labour	Tim Roberts	101	3.7	
Majority		752	27.6	
Turnout		2,722	36.2	
Registered electors		7,533		
Liberal Democrats win (new seat)				

Drayton, Sutton Courtenay & Steventon
Party	Candidate	Votes	%	±%
Liberal Democrats	Peter Stevens*	1,157	42.3	
Conservative	Chris Campbell	623	22.8	
Reform	Kevin Bulmer*	608	22.2	
Green	Michel Grandjean	195	7.1	
Labour	Stephen Hale	153	5.6	
Majority		534	19.5	
Turnout		2,736	33.6	
Registered electors		8,163		
Liberal Democrats win (new seat)				

Faringdon
Party	Candidate	Votes	%	±%
Liberal Democrats	Bethia Thomas*	1,261	47.7	−7.8
Reform	Tim Perkin	577	21.8	New
Conservative	James Famakin	540	20.4	−15.2
Green	Katherine Foxhall	145	5.5	New
Labour	Chris Palmer	122	4.6	−4.3
Majority		684	25.9	+6.0
Turnout		2,645	35.0	−7.0
Registered electors		7,578		
Liberal Democrats hold		Swing		

Grove
Party	Candidate	Votes	%	±%
Liberal Democrats	Ron Batstone	886	42.3	
Reform	Martin Freeman	554	26.4	
Conservative	Tim Patmore	373	17.8	
Green	Adam Swallow	123	5.9	
Labour	Margaret Jones	122	5.8	
IOA	Andrew Cattell	39	1.9	
Majority		332	15.9	
Turnout		2,097	28.5	
Registered electors		7,367		
Liberal Democrats win (new seat)				

Harwell, Western Valley & Blewbury
Party	Candidate	Votes	%	±%
Liberal Democrats	Rebekah Fletcher	1,102	46.0	
Conservative	Cath Convery	546	22.8	
Reform	Christopher Maguire	439	18.3	
Green	Nicholas Freestone	182	7.6	
Labour	Luke Hislop	125	5.2	
Majority		556	23.2	
Turnout		2,394	37.4	
Registered electors		6,421		
Liberal Democrats win (new seat)				

Kennington & Radley
Party	Candidate	Votes	%	±%
Liberal Democrats	Diana Lugova	1,409	49.3	−4.1
Conservative	Daniel Stafford	748	26.2	−8.1
Green	Thomas Gaston	369	12.9	+5.9
Labour	Michele Paule	169	5.9	+0.6
Independent	Rhys Hathaway	164	5.7	New
Majority		661	23.1	+4.0
Turnout		2,859	33.0	−9.6
Registered electors		8,788		
Liberal Democrats hold		Swing		

Kingston & Stanford
Party	Candidate	Votes	%	±%
Conservative	Lee Evans	1,166	39.4	
Liberal Democrats	Hannah Griffin	939	31.7	
Reform	John Ranson	570	19.3	
Green	Matthew Carpenter	155	5.2	
Labour	Charlotte Rose	129	4.4	
Majority		227	7.7	
Turnout		2,959	39.0	
Registered electors		7,610		
Conservative win (new seat)				

Marcham & Cumnor
Party	Candidate	Votes	%	±%
Conservative	James Plumb	1,002	45.1	
Liberal Democrats	Ricky Treadwell	946	42.6	
Green	Annette Edwards	178	8.0	
Labour	Michael Boyd	94	4.2	
Majority		56	2.5	
Turnout		2,220	35.3	
Registered electors		6,376		
Conservative win (new seat)				

North Hinksey
Party	Candidate	Votes	%	±%
Liberal Democrats	Judy Roberts*	1,458	51.9	−2.2
Reform	Oliver-Tristan Barker	468	16.6	New
Conservative	Christopher Fox	453	16.1	−7.1
Green	Cheryl Briggs	250	8.9	+1.0
Labour Co-op	Toby James	182	6.5	−4.4
Majority		990	35.3	+4.4
Turnout		2,811	36.2	−8.3
Registered electors		7,818		
Liberal Democrats hold		Swing		

Shrivenham
Party	Candidate	Votes	%	±%
Green	Emma Markham	1,050	32.1	−7.9
Conservative	Gordon Lundie	956	29.3	−22.9
Reform	Sarah von Simson	824	25.2	New
Liberal Democrats	David Brook	333	10.2	New
Labour	Richard Johnson	103	3.2	−4.6
Majority		94	2.8	−9.4
Turnout		3,266	40.2	−3.6
Registered electors		8,148		
Green gain from Conservative		Swing		

Wantage West
Party	Candidate	Votes	%	±%
Liberal Democrats	Jenny Hannaby*	1,380	51.0	
Reform	Henry de Kretser	623	23.0	
Conservative	Craig Brown	358	13.2	
Green	Viral Patel	211	7.8	
Labour	Owen Heaney	134	5.0	
Majority		757	28.0	
Turnout		2,706	32.3	
Registered electors		8,405		
Liberal Democrats win (new seat)				

=== West Oxfordshire ===
==== District summary ====
West Oxfordshire district summary
Party	Seats	+/-	Votes	%	+/-
Conservative	5	▲1	10,110	29.9	–15.4
Liberal Democrats	4	▲1	10,141	30.0	+6.7
Labour	2	▼1	4,118	12.2	–7.6
Reform	0	Steady	7,178	21.1	+20.4
Green	0	Steady	2,083	6.2	-3.2
Independent	0	Steady	181	0.5	-0.9
Heritage	0	Steady	15	0.1	New
Total	11	▲1	33,826		

Bampton & Carterton South
Party	Candidate	Votes	%	±%
Conservative	Ted Fenton*	1,360	37.1	
Liberal Democrats	Alaric Smith	1,313	35.8	
Reform	Mark Bezerra Speeks	761	20.7	
Green	Dan Eisenhandler	136	3.7	
Labour	John Stansfield	100	2.7	
Majority		47	1.3	
Turnout		3,670	40.1	
Registered electors		9,185		
Conservative win (new seat)				

Brize Norton & Carterton East
Party	Candidate	Votes	%	±%
Liberal Democrats	Toyah Overton	661	33.7	
Conservative	Nick Leverton*	576	29.4	
Reform	Thomas Hogg	514	26.2	
Independent	Barry Ingleton	91	4.6	
Green	Sandra Simpson	55	2.8	
Labour Co-op	James Taylor	50	2.5	
Heritage	Stephen Breedon	15	0.8	
Majority		85	4.3	
Turnout		1,962	26.8	
Registered electors		7,336		
Liberal Democrats win (new seat)				

Burford & Carterton West
Party	Candidate	Votes	%	±%
Conservative	Nick Field-Johnson*	1,022	32.6	
Reform	Sarah Evans	914	29.2	
Liberal Democrats	Kathy Godwin	879	28.0	
Labour	Dave Wesson	109	3.5	
Green	Anthony Barrett	120	3.8	
Independent	David Cox	90	2.9	
Majority		143	4.6	
Turnout		3,134	35.4	
Registered electors		8,880		
Conservative win (new seat)				

Charlbury & Wychwood
Party	Candidate	Votes	%	±%
Liberal Democrats	Liz Leffman*	1,828	48.8	+1.5
Conservative	Emma Nell	769	20.5	−16.6
Reform	Stephen Gibbons	722	19.3	New
Green	Mary Robertson	255	6.8	−0.6
Labour	Robin Puttick	169	4.5	−3.7
Majority		1,059	28.3	+18.1
Turnout		3,743	41.1	−7.9
Registered electors		9,133		
Liberal Democrats hold		Swing		

Chipping Norton
Party	Candidate	Votes	%	±%
Labour Co-op	Geoff Saul*	965	33.6	−9.0
Conservative	David Rogers	755	26.3	−14.6
Reform	Henry Watt	668	23.2	New
Liberal Democrats	Leslie Channon	259	9.0	+3.4
Green	Claire Lasko	228	7.9	−3.0
Majority		210	7.3	+5.6
Turnout		2,875	34.5	−6.5
Registered electors		8,334		
Labour Co-op hold		Swing		

Eynsham
Party	Candidate	Votes	%	±%
Liberal Democrats	Dan Levy*	1,298	47.8	−1.9
Conservative	Lysette Nicholls	614	22.6	−19.9
Reform	Peter Lynn	495	18.2	New
Green	Frances Mortimer	175	6.4	New
Labour	Kate England	132	4.9	−2.9
Majority		684	25.2	+18.0
Turnout		2,714	41.9	−8.0
Registered electors		6,475		
Liberal Democrats hold		Swing		

Hanborough & Hailey
Party	Candidate	Votes	%	±%
Conservative	Liam Walker*	1,270	42.9	
Liberal Democrats	Hannah Massie	963	32.5	
Reform	James Gibbs	514	17.4	
Green	Sarah Marshall	126	4.3	
Labour	Sue Tanner	89	3.0	
Majority		307	10.4	
Turnout		2,962	43.4	
Registered electors		6,843		
Conservative win (new seat)				

Witney North & East
Party	Candidate	Votes	%	±%
Conservative	James Robertshaw	1,078	29.6	−0.8
Labour Co-op	Duncan Enright*	1,059	29.0	−11.1
Reform	Richard Langridge	710	19.5	+13.5
Green	Andrew Prosser	497	13.6	−9.9
Liberal Democrats	Liz Price	302	8.3	New
Majority		19	0.6	−9.1
Turnout		3,646	42.7	−2.8
Registered electors		8,553		
Conservative gain from Labour Co-op		Swing	5.15	

Witney South & Central
Party	Candidate	Votes	%	±%
Labour	Andrew Coles*	992	34.1	−9.2
Reform	Ben Durston	759	26.1	+24.8
Conservative	Jack Treloar	691	23.8	−15.9
Liberal Democrats	Paul Barrow	290	10.0	−3.7
Green	Harriet Marshall	177	6.1	−1.1
Majority		233	8.0	+4.4
Turnout		2,909	32.9	−4.1
Registered electors		8,856		
Labour hold		Swing		

Witney West & Ducklington
Party	Candidate	Votes	%	±%
Conservative	Thomas Ashby	1,075	37.9	
Liberal Democrats	Ben Morel-Allen	831	29.3	
Reform	Ross Kelly	612	21.6	
Labour Co-op	Georgia Meadows	225	7.9	
Green	Rosie Pearson	94	3.3	
Majority		244	8.6	
Turnout		2,837	35.5	
Registered electors		8,014		
Conservative win (new seat)				

Woodstock
Party	Candidate	Votes	%	±%
Liberal Democrats	Andy Graham*	1,517	45.0	−2.0
Conservative	Ian Hudspeth	900	26.7	−16.3
Reform	James Nash	509	15.1	New
Labour	Nick Melliss	228	6.8	−3.2
Green	Barry Wheatley	220	6.5	New
Majority		617	18.3	+14.3
Turnout		3,374	38.7	−10.7
Registered electors		8,752		
Liberal Democrats hold		Swing		

== Post-election changes ==
=== Chesterton & Launton ===
Chesterton & Launton by-election, 3rd September 2026
Party	Candidate	Votes	%	±%
Liberal Democrats	James Hartley	985	41.7	+8.9
Conservative	Sandy Dallimore	683	28.9	+0.6
Reform	Ian Hodgson	547	23.2	−3.5
Labour	Gregory Fish	75	3.2	−2.3
Green	Meri Mosharrafa	71	3.0	−3.6
Majority		302	12.8	+8.2
Turnout		2361	31.4	−6.4
Liberal Democrats hold		Swing		

== See also ==
- Oxfordshire County Council elections
