= 2026 Oxford City Council election =

Local election in Oxfordshire, England

- 7 May 2026

24 out of 48 seats to Oxford City Council 25 seats needed for a majority
	First party	Second party	Third party
Leader	Susan Brown	Chris Jarvis	Christopher Smowton
Party	Labour	Green	Liberal Democrats
Last election	20 seats, 38.2%	8 seats, 17.1%	9 seats, 15.2%
Seats before	21	9	9
Seats won	10	9	4
Seats after	20	13	9
Seat change	▼1	▲4	Steady
Popular vote	12,554	13,236	6,082
Percentage	29.3%	30.9%	14.2%
Swing	▼8.9%	▲13.8%	▼1.0%
	Fourth party	Fifth party
Leader	(Note: Ajaz Rehman was the leader of the Oxford Independent group and Sajjad Malik was the leader of the Real Independents group.)	David Henwood
Party	Independent	IOA
Last election	7 seats, 6.0%	4 seats, 15.5%
Seats before	5 (Note: Of the 5 Independent councillors, 2 sat in the Oxford Independent group, 2 sat in the Real Independents group, and 1 was non-aligned.)	4
Seats won	1	0
Seats after	2	4
Seat change	▼3	Steady
Popular vote	2,298	1,951
Percentage	5.4%	4.6%
Swing	▼0.6%	▼10.9%
- Winner of each seat at the 2026 Oxford City Council election
Leader before election
Susan Brown
Labour
No overall control (Note: Labour minority.)
Leader after election
Susan Brown
Labour
No overall control

The 2026 Oxford City Council election was held on 7 May 2026, alongside the other local elections across the United Kingdom being held on the same day, to elect 24 of 48 members of Oxford City Council in Oxfordshire, England.

Prior to the election, the council was under no overall control, with Labour being the largest party and running the council as a minority administration. The election saw the council remain under no overall control. Labour had a net loss of seats, but remained the largest party. Following the election, there were negotiations to see if an alliance or coalition which would command a majority could be formed. These negotiations were unsuccessful, and therefore Labour continued to run the council as a minority administration.

Due to ongoing local government reorganisation, this was the final election to Oxford City Council before it will be abolished and replaced by a successor unitary authority. Elections to the successor authority are due to take place in 2027.

== Summary ==
=== Background ===
In 2024, the council remained under no overall control with the Labour Party the largest party. The council election was not delayed after a debate.

=== Council composition ===
After 2024 election		Before 2026 election	
Party	Seats	Party	Seats
Labour	20	Labour	21
Liberal Democrats	9	Liberal Democrats	9
Green	8	Green	9
IOA	4	IOA	4
Independent	7	Independent	5

Changes 2024–2026:

- June 2024: Alistair Morris (Green) resigns – by-election held July 2024
- July 2024: Kate Robinson (Green) wins by-election
- March 2025: Barbara Coyne (Independent, elected as Labour) resigns – by-election held May 2025
- May 2025: James Taylor (Labour) nominally gains by-election from Labour
- January 2026: Edward Mundy (Independent, elected as Labour) joins Greens

=== Election result ===
2026 Oxford City Council election
Party	This election				Full council			This election		
Party	Candidates	Seats	Net	Seats %	Other	Total	Total %	Votes	Votes %	+/−
Labour	{{{candidates}}}	10	▼1	41.7	10	20	41.7	12,554	28.9	–9.3
Green	{{{candidates}}}	9	▲4	37.5	4	13	27.1	13,236	30.5	+13.4
Liberal Democrats	{{{candidates}}}	4	Steady	16.7	5	9	18.8	6,082	14.0	–1.2
IOA	{{{candidates}}}	0	Steady	0.0	4	4	8.3	2,522	5.8	–9.7
Independent	{{{candidates}}}	1	▼3	4.2	1	2	4.2	2,298	5.3	–0.7
Reform	{{{candidates}}}	0	Steady	0.0	0	0	0.0	4,008	9.2	N/A
Conservative	{{{candidates}}}	0	Steady	0.0	0	0	0.0	2,641	6.1	–0.9
Workers Party	{{{candidates}}}	0	Steady	0.0	0	0	0.0	29	0.1	±0.0
TUSC	{{{candidates}}}	0	Steady	0.0	0	0	0.0	25	0.1	–0.8

== Incumbents ==
Ward	Incumbent councillor	Party	Re-standing
Barton & Sandhills	Mike Rowley	Labour	Yes
Blackbird Leys	Lubna Arshad (Note: Elected at the 2024 Blackbird Leys by-election.)	Labour	Yes
Carfax & Jericho	Alex Hollingsworth	Labour	Yes
Churchill	Susan Brown	Labour	Yes
Cowley	Amar Latif (Note: Originally elected as a Labour councillor, but subsequently left the party to sit as an independent.)	Independent	No
Cutteslowe & Sunnymead	Laurence Fouweather	Liberal Democrats	Yes
Donnington	Rosie Rawle	Green	Yes
Headington	Christopher Smowton	Liberal Democrats	Yes
Headington Hill & Northway	James Taylor (Note: Elected at the 2025 Headington Hill & Northway by-election.)	Labour	Yes
Hinksey Park	Naomi Waite	Labour	No
Holywell	Edward Mundy	Green	No
Littlemore	Tiago Corais	Labour	Yes
Lye Valley	Ajaz Rehman	Independent	Yes (Note: In Cowley ward.)
Marston	Kate Robinson (Note: Elected at the 2024 Marston by-election.)	Green	Yes
Northfield Brook	Hosnieh Djafari-Marbini	Independent	No
Osney & St Thomas	Lois Muddiman	Green	Yes
Quarry & Risinghurst	Chewe Munkonge	Labour	Yes
Rose Hill & Iffley	Ed Turner	Labour	Yes
St Clement's	Jemima Hunt	Labour	No
St Mary's	Emily Kerr	Green	Yes
Summertown	Katherine Miles	Liberal Democrats	Yes
Temple Cowley	Sajjad Malik	Independent	Yes
Walton Manor	Louise Upton	Labour	Yes
Wolvercote	Jo Sandelson	Liberal Democrats	No

== Ward results ==
=== Barton & Sandhills ===
Barton & Sandhills
Party	Candidate	Votes	%	±%
Labour Co-op	Mike Rowley*	578	36.9	+1.0
Reform	Felix Bloomfield	336	21.5	N/A
Green	Tariq Saeed	237	15.1	N/A
Independent	Chaka Artwell	165	10.5	−21.3*
Conservative	Vernon Porter	124	7.9	−1.5
Liberal Democrats	Paul Rogers	96	6.1	−3.2
Workers Party	Boris Fedorov	29	1.9	N/A
Majority		242	15.4	+11.3
Turnout		1,569	33.9	+5.7
Registered electors		~4,628		
Labour Co-op hold				

* Change compared to 2024 when standing as an Independent Oxford Alliance candidate.

=== Blackbird Leys ===
Blackbird Leys
Party	Candidate	Votes	%	±%
Labour Co-op	Lubna Arshad*	588	48.5	+6.6
Reform	Kornel Schesztak	337	27.8	N/A
Green	Indigo Haynes	151	12.4	+7.2
Conservative	Fay Sims	71	5.9	−1.2
Liberal Democrats	Alexandrine Kantor	49	4.0	−0.1
TUSC	James Morbin	17	1.4	−3.7
Majority		251	20.7	N/A
Turnout		1,221	29.7	+9.6
Registered electors		~4,111		
Labour Co-op hold				

=== Carfax & Jericho ===
Carfax & Jericho
Party	Candidate	Votes	%	±%
Green	Sushila Dhall	811	50.2	▲23.7
Labour Co-op	Alex Hollingsworth*	523	32.4	▼24.2
Liberal Democrats	John Howson	123	7.6	▼1.7
Conservative	Harriet Dolby	84	5.2	▼2.4
Reform	Vittorio Cuneo-Flood	75	4.6	N/A
Majority		288	17.8	N/A
Turnout		1,616	48.9	▲14.8
Registered electors		~3,305		
Green gain from Labour Co-op		Swing	▲24.0	

=== Churchill ===
Churchill
Party	Candidate	Votes	%	±%
Labour	Susan Brown*	570	40.5	−10.9
Green	Ines Wilhelm	397	28.2	+15.2
Reform	Michael Sakkalli	231	16.4	N/A
Conservative	Tim Patmore	133	9.5	−7.4
Liberal Democrats	Peter Coggins	75	5.3	−3.4
Majority		173	12.3	–22.3
Turnout		1,417	29.5	+5.5
Registered electors		~4,803		
Labour hold		Swing	▼13.1	

=== Cowley ===
Cowley
Party	Candidate	Votes	%	±%
Green	Edward Mundy	1,031	46.2	▲40.9
Independent	Ajaz Rehman	565	25.3	N/A
Labour	Michael Boyd	291	13.0	▼15.6
Reform	Ian Szwajca	219	9.8	N/A
Liberal Democrats	George Busby	69	3.1	▼19.4
Conservative	Andrea Stephenson	58	2.6	▼0.4
Majority		466	20.9	N/A
Turnout		2,241	45.5	▲1.3
Registered electors		~4,925		
Green gain from Independent				

=== Cuttleslowe & Sunnymead ===
Cuttleslowe & Sunnymead
Party	Candidate	Votes	%	±%
Liberal Democrats	Laurence Fouweather*	1,044	44.5	+2.7
Green	Andrea Schiavi	396	16.9	+4.5
Conservative	David Cunningham	388	16.6	−3.3
Labour	Nancy Cartwright	351	15.0	−10.8
Reform	Michael Andrews	165	7.0	N/A
Majority		648	27.6	+11.6
Turnout		2,357	48.1	+7.7
Registered electors		~4,900		
Liberal Democrats hold		Swing	▼0.9	

=== Donnington ===
Donnington
Party	Candidate	Votes	%	±%
Green	Rosie Rawle*	986	51.1	▲11.7
Independent	Saqib Faradoon	468	24.3	N/A
Labour Co-op	Ralph Noble	267	13.8	▼16.3
Reform	Anna Taylor	109	5.7	N/A
Liberal Democrats	Graham Jones	58	3.0	▲1.1
Conservative	Simon Bazley	41	2.1	▼1.9
Majority		518	26.8	▲17.5
Turnout		1,936	43.3	▲8.1
Registered electors		~4,471		
Green hold				

=== Headington ===
Headington
Party	Candidate	Votes	%	±%
Liberal Democrats	Christopher Smowton*	927	41.6	+2.0
Labour	Emily Lygo	511	23.0	+0.3
Green	Neil Doig	422	19.0	+11.4
Conservative	James Jackson	185	8.3	+5.2
Reform	Sandhya Sunkara	181	8.1	N/A
Majority		416	18.6	+6.0
Turnout		2,238	48.8	+3.7
Registered electors		~4,586		
Liberal Democrats hold		Swing	▲0.9	

=== Headington Hill & Northway ===
Headington Hill & Northway
Party	Candidate	Votes	%	±%
Labour	James Taylor*	650	40.8	–12.9
IOA	Nasreen Majeed	427	26.8	N/A
Green	Sam Alston	238	14.9	–2.9
Reform	Tenson Jacob	137	8.6	N/A
Conservative	George Robinson	85	5.3	–11.6
Liberal Democrats	Eleonore Vogel	48	3.0	–8.6
TUSC	Agnieszka Kowalska	8	0.5	N/A
Majority		223	14.0	–22.0
Turnout		1,596	40.1	+10.3
Registered electors		~3,980		
Labour hold				

=== Hinksey Park ===
Hinksey Park
Party	Candidate	Votes	%	±%
Labour	Siobhan Lancaster	1,012	49.8	−1.2
Green	Hannah Scott	665	32.7	+14.0
Liberal Democrats	Rick Tanner	127	6.2	+0.9
Reform	Geoffrey Ager	122	6.0	N/A
Conservative	Amy Campbell	107	5.3	+2.0
Majority		347	17.1	–12.1
Turnout		2,040	47.8	+6.1
Registered electors		~4,268		
Labour hold		Swing	▼7.6	

=== Holywell ===
Holywell
Party	Candidate	Votes	%	±%
Green	Alfie Davis	808	68.0	▲21.9
Labour	Awab Kazuz	186	15.6	▼22.3
Liberal Democrats	Ian Bearder	120	10.1	▲0.1
Conservative	Harry Richardson	75	6.3	N/A
Majority		622	52.4	▲44.2
Turnout		1,197	46.0	▲10.7
Registered electors		~2,602		
Green hold		Swing	▲22.1	

=== Littlemore ===
Littlemore
Party	Candidate	Votes	%	±%
Labour	Tiago Corais*	726	42.6	+0.3
Independent	David Stares	400	23.5	N/A
Green	Tamsin Blaxter	251	14.7	+9.0
Reform	James Baker	210	12.3	N/A
Conservative	Daniel Stafford	89	5.2	N/A
Liberal Democrats	Liz Wood	27	1.6	−1.3
Majority		326	10.1	N/A
Turnout		1,708	38.1	+4.4
Registered electors		~4,483		
Labour hold				

=== Lye Valley ===
Lye Valley
Party	Candidate	Votes	%	±%
Green	James Thorniley	500	35.2	▲27.1
Labour	Stephen Harwood	474	33.3	▼6.7
Reform	Jakub Zagdanski	248	17.4	N/A
Conservative	Gary Dixon	124	8.7	▲4.0
Liberal Democrats	Maria Bourbon	76	5.3	▲2.1
Majority		26	1.9	N/A
Turnout		1,434	35.6	▼0.8
Registered electors		~4,028		
Green gain from Independent		Swing	▲16.9	

=== Marston ===
Marston
Party	Candidate	Votes	%	±%
Green	Kate Robinson*	969	41.3	▲4.3
IOA	Emily Scaysbrook	749	31.9	N/A
Labour	Charlotte Vinnicombe	369	15.7	▼29.0
Reform	Richard Lewin	146	6.2	N/A
Conservative	Duncan Hatfield	69	2.9	▼11.9
Liberal Democrats	Andy McKay	44	1.9	▼1.7
Majority		220	9.4	N/A
Turnout		2,348	51.8	▲8.9
Registered electors		~4,533		
Green hold				

=== Northfield Brook ===
Northfield Brook
Party	Candidate	Votes	%	±%
Labour Co-op	Trish Elphinstone	488	40.5	+0.2
Reform	Dianne Copestake	367	30.4	N/A
Green	David Newman	207	17.2	+10.2
Conservative	Paul Sims	82	6.8	−0.2
Liberal Democrats	Rosemary Morlin	62	5.1	+1.3
Majority		121	10.1	+9.4
Turnout		1,215	27.4	+5.0
Registered electors		~4,434		
Labour Co-op gain from Independent				

=== Osney & St Thomas ===
Osney & St Thomas
Party	Candidate	Votes	%	±%
Green	Lois Muddiman*	912	50.5	▲16.2
Labour	David Calonge	594	32.9	▼21.6
Reform	Rose-Marie Wheeler	114	6.3	N/A
Conservative	Louis Williams	101	5.6	▲0.5
Liberal Democrats	Harry Morgan	84	4.7	▼1.3
Majority		318	17.6	N/A
Turnout		1,811	42.9	▲5.1
Registered electors		~4,221		
Green hold		Swing	▲18.9	

=== Quarry & Risinghurst ===
Quarry & Risinghurst
Party	Candidate	Votes	%	±%
Labour	Chewe Munkonge*	943	37.4	+2.9
Liberal Democrats	Kai Zolleis	568	22.5	−12.2
Green	Stephen Hurt	344	13.6	+7.5
IOA	Alison Kahn	317	12.6	−7.9
Reform	Cristina Parau	255	10.1	N/A
Conservative	Edmund Johnstone	96	3.8	−0.4
Majority		375	14.9	N/A
Turnout		2,531	50.1	+1.7
Registered electors		~5,052		
Labour hold		Swing	▲7.6	

=== Rose Hill & Iffley ===
Rose Hill & Iffley
Party	Candidate	Votes	%	±%
Labour	Edward Turner*	952	46.9	+5.7
IOA	Zack Iqbal	458	22.6	−21.5
Green	Luke Barbanneau	299	14.7	+6.6
Reform	Prudence Dailey	203	10.0	N/A
Conservative	Suresh Lal	60	3.0	−0.1
Liberal Democrats	Geraldine Coggins	59	2.9	+0.1
Majority		494	24.3	N/A
Turnout		2,039	44.9	+1.3
Registered electors		~4,541		
Labour hold		Swing	▲13.6	

=== St Clements ===
St Clements
Party	Candidate	Votes	%	±%
Green	Ahalya Bala	875	58.2	▲25.3
Labour Co-op	Thomas Boyd	403	26.8	▼3.0
Reform	Martin Young	88	5.9	N/A
Conservative	Vinay Raniga	72	4.8	N/A
Liberal Democrats	Pippa Hitchcock	65	4.3	▲0.4
Majority		472	31.4	▲30.3
Turnout		1,503	39.0	▲0.1
Registered electors		~3,854		
Green gain from Labour		Swing	▲14.2	

=== St Mary's ===
St Mary's
Party	Candidate	Votes	%	±%
Green	Emily Kerr*	1,154	60.7	▲14.1
Labour	Toby James	473	24.9	▼2.2
Liberal Democrats	Richard Whelan	105	5.5	▲3.2
Reform	Paula MacFarlane	86	4.5	N/A
Conservative	Gloria Croxall	82	4.3	▲2.8
Majority		681	35.8	▲16.3
Turnout		1,916	31.4	▼6.5
Registered electors		~6,102		
Green hold		Swing	▲8.2	

=== Summertown ===
Summertown
Party	Candidate	Votes	%	±%
Liberal Democrats	Katherine Miles*	836	42.0	+3.7
Labour	Freda Wolfenden	486	24.4	−9.6
Green	James Hewett	318	16.0	+4.4
Conservative	Christopher Fox	254	12.8	−3.3
Reform	Fee Yin	96	4.8	N/A
Majority		350	17.6	+13.4
Turnout		1,992	50.0	+8.6
Registered electors		~5,984		
Liberal Democrats hold		Swing	▲6.7	

=== Temple Cowley ===
Temple Cowley
Party	Candidate	Votes	%	±%
Independent	Saj Malik*	700	39.3	−9.3
Green	Heather Stallard	535	30.0	+22.9
Labour	Joseph McManners	331	18.6	−17.3
Reform	Michael Sargent	109	6.1	N/A
Liberal Democrats	Tony Brett	69	3.9	±0.0
Conservative	Patricia Jones	39	2.2	−0.6
Majority		165	9.3	–3.3
Turnout		1,786	37.4	–1.0
Registered electors		~4,775		
Independent hold		Swing	▼15.7	

=== Walton Manor ===
Walton Manor
Party	Candidate	Votes	%	±%
Labour	Louise Upton*	664	38.5	−19.4
Liberal Democrats	Joanne Bowlt	443	25.7	+8.7
Green	Zelalemawee Asheber	422	24.5	+8.5
Conservative	Penelpe Lenon	134	7.8	−1.3
Reform	David Lincoln	60	3.5	N/A
Majority		221	12.8	–28.1
Turnout		1,728	37.4	–4.8
Registered electors		~4,620		
Labour hold		Swing	▼14.1	

=== Wolvercote ===
Wolvercote
Party	Candidate	Votes	%	±%
Liberal Democrats	Elizabeth Turkson-Wood	908	43.0	−7.3
IOA	Richard Garbutt	571	27.0	N/A
Green	Cristina Palamini	308	14.6	+4.4
Labour	Bev Humberstone	124	5.9	−17.0
Reform	Stuart Jolley	114	5.4	N/A
Conservative	Paul Morris	88	4.2	−12.3
Majority		337	16.0	–11.3
Turnout		2,118	54.4	+16.9
Registered electors		~3,893		
Liberal Democrats hold				
