= George Northey =

George Northey may refer to:

- George Northey (footballer) (1883–?), footballer for Southampton
- George Northey (cricketer) (1835–1906), English cricketer and British Army officer
