= 2024 Oxford City Council election =

Local election in Oxford, UK

- 2 May 2024

25 out of 48 seats to Oxford City Council 25 seats needed for a majority

	First party	Second party	Third party
Leader	Susan Brown	Christopher Smowton	Chris Jarvis
Party	Labour	Liberal Democrats	Green
Last election	32 seats, 43.9%	9 seats, 16.9%	6 seats, 18.3%
Seats before	22	9	6
Seats won	11	5	4
Seats after	20	9	8
Seat change	▼2	Steady	▲2
Popular vote	15,260	6,052	6,823
Percentage	38.2%	15.2%	17.1%
Swing	▼5.7%	▼1.7%	▼1.2%
	Fourth party	Fifth party
Party	Independent	IOA
Last election	1 seat, 12.3%	N/A
Seats before	11	0
Seats won	1	4
Seats after	7	4
Seat change	▼4	▲4
Popular vote	2,406	6,200
Percentage	6.0%	15.5%
Swing	▼6.3%	N/A
- Winner of each seat at the 2024 Oxford City Council election
Leader before election
Susan Brown
Labour
No overall control
Leader after election
Susan Brown
Labour
No overall control

The 2024 Oxford City Council election was held on Thursday 2 May 2024, alongside the other local elections being held in the United Kingdom on the same day. The councillors elected will serve a four-year term ending in 2028.

== Background ==
Oxford City Council elects half of its councillors to every two years to serve four-year terms. However, the seats up for election in 2024 were last elected in 2021, due to the COVID-19 pandemic.

At the previous election in 2022, Labour held its majority on the council, however, they lost three seats to bring the total number of Labour councillors to 32. In October 2023, Labour lost control of the council due to nine councillors resigning in opposition to Keir Starmer's refusal to call for a ceasefire in the Gaza war. By the time of the election, the council remained under no overall control, with a Labour leader. Robert Ford suggested in The Guardian that Oxford would be a key testing ground of dissatisfaction from Labour's left wing and from Muslim and young progressive voters.

== Summary ==
Oxford City Council's composition following the 2024 election.

Following the election, the council remained under no overall control. Labour made a net loss of a further two seats, but remained the largest party on the council. They continued to run the council as a minority administration after the election. The Green Party gained two seats. There was a net loss of four independent councillors. A new local party, the Independent Oxford Alliance (IOA), which had only been created earlier in 2024, won four seats.

=== Election result ===
2024 Oxford City Council election
Party	This election				Full council			This election		
Party	Candidates	Seats	Net	Seats %	Other	Total	Total %	Votes	Votes %	+/−
Labour	25 (Note: Including four Labour and Co-operative candidates.)	11	▼2	44.0	9	20	41.7	15,260	38.2	–5.7
Liberal Democrats	24	5	Steady	20.0	4	9	18.8	6,052	15.2	–1.7
Green	24	4	▲2	16.0	4	8	16.7	6,823	17.1	–1.2
Independent	6	1	▼4	4.0	6	7	14.6	2,406	6.0	–6.3
IOA	11	4	▲4	16.0	0	4	8.3	6,200	15.5	N/A
Conservative	21	0	Steady	0.0	0	0	0.0	2,777	7.0	–1.0
TUSC	10	0	Steady	0.0	0	0	0.0	371	0.9	+0.3
Workers Party	1	0	Steady	0.0	0	0	0.0	31	0.1	N/A

== Ward results ==
=== Barton and Sandhills ===
Barton and Sandhills
Party	Candidate	Votes	%	±%
Labour	Asima Qayyum	454	35.9	–16.9
IOA	Chaka Artwell	402	31.8	+12.5
Independent	Jabu Nala-Hartley*	173	13.7	N/A
Conservative	Eric Sukumaran	119	9.4	–6.2
Liberal Democrats	Paul Rogers	118	9.3	–1.4
Majority		52	4.1	
Turnout		1,266	28.2	+1.4
Labour hold		Swing	▼14.7	

=== Blackbird Leys ===
Blackbird Leys
Party	Candidate	Votes	%	±%
Labour	Linda Smith	423	45.8	–29.5
Labour	Lubna Arshad	411	44.6	–30.7
Independent	Michael Evans	369	40.0	N/A
Independent	Suzette McLean	340	36.8	N/A
Conservative	Patricia Jones	72	7.8	N/A
Green	Cynthia Muthoni	53	5.8	–2.9
TUSC	Sam Bennett	52	5.6	–2.2
Green	David Thomas	43	4.6	–4.1
Liberal Democrats	Alexandrine Kantor	41	4.4	–3.8
TUSC	Agnieszka Kowalska	40	4.4	–3.4
Turnout			20.1	
Labour hold				
Labour hold				

=== Carfax and Jericho ===
Carfax and Jericho
Party	Candidate	Votes	%	±%
Labour Co-op	Lizzy Diggins*	689	56.6	+0.4
Green	Emma Garnett	323	26.5	+1.1
Liberal Democrats	Jessica Frankopan	113	9.3	–2.5
Conservative	Alexander Elliott	92	7.6	+0.9
Majority		366	30.1	
Turnout		1,217	34.1	–2.6
Labour Co-op hold		Swing	▼0.4	

=== Churchill ===
Churchill
Party	Candidate	Votes	%	±%
Labour	Mark Lygo*	572	51.4	–6.5
Conservative	Mark Bhagwandin	188	16.9	+2.4
Green	Duncan Watts	145	13.0	–0.3
TUSC	James Morbin	111	10.0	+4.2
Liberal Democrats	Peter Coggins	97	8.7	+0.2
Majority		384	34.5	
Turnout		1,113	24.0	–2.6
Labour hold		Swing	▼4.5	

=== Cowley ===
Cowley
Party	Candidate	Votes	%	±%
IOA	Ian Yeatman	842	39.2	N/A
Labour	Mark Hull	614	28.6	–19.4
Liberal Democrats	Scott Urban	484	22.5	+19.9
Green	Sam Alston	113	5.3	–4.3
Conservative	Luke King	64	3.0	–3.1
TUSC	Alex Chapman	30	1.4	N/A
Majority		228	10.6	
Turnout		2,147	44.2	+1.4
IOA gain from Labour				

=== Cutteslowe and Sunnymead ===
Cutteslowe and Sunnymead
Party	Candidate	Votes	%	±%
Liberal Democrats	Andrew Gant*	834	41.8	–13.7
Labour	Charlotte Vinnicombe	515	25.8	+3.5
Conservative	Sam McNeil	397	19.9	+6.8
Green	John Fox	247	12.4	+3.3
Majority		319	16.0	
Turnout		1,993	40.4	–3.7
Liberal Democrats hold		Swing	▼8.6	

=== Donnington ===
Donnington
Party	Candidate	Votes	%	±%
Green	Max Morris	701	39.4	–0.5
Labour	Toby James	536	30.1	–1.3
IOA	Halima Banaras	414	23.3	N/A
Conservative	Simon Bazley	72	4.0	+0.3
Liberal Democrats	Pippa Hitchcock	34	1.9	±0.0
TUSC	Kerensa Hone	22	1.2	N/A
Majority		165	9.3	
Turnout		1,779	35.2	–11.4
Green hold		Swing	▲0.4	

=== Headington ===
Headington
Party	Candidate	Votes	%	±%
Liberal Democrats	Mohammed Altaf-Khan*	847	39.6	–8.4
Independent	Peter West	577	27.0	N/A
Labour	Sumukh Kaul	485	22.7	–14.5
Green	Ray Hitchins	163	7.6	+1.2
Conservative	Harjot Bajaj	67	3.1	–4.0
Majority		270	12.6	
Turnout		2,139	45.1	–1.3
Liberal Democrats hold				

=== Headington Hill and Northway ===
Headington Hill and Northway
Party	Candidate	Votes	%	±%
Labour	Nigel Chapman*	653	53.7	+5.0
Green	Stephen Hurt	216	17.8	+8.7
Conservative	Alexander Horsfall-Turner	205	16.9	+10.8
Liberal Democrats	Hana Packford	141	11.6	+5.5
Majority		437	36.0	
Turnout		1,215	29.8	–9.2
Labour hold		Swing	▼1.9	

=== Hinksey Park ===
Hinksey Park
Party	Candidate	Votes	%	±%
Labour	Anna Railton*	917	51.0	–10.9
IOA	Benjamin Christopher	391	21.7	N/A
Green	Nuala Young	337	18.7	–1.7
Liberal Democrats	Rick Tanner	95	5.3	–6.4
Conservative	Simon Howell	59	3.3	–2.7
Majority		526	29.2	
Turnout		1,799	41.7	–0.9
Labour hold				

=== Holywell ===
Holywell
Party	Candidate	Votes	%	±%
Green	Dianne Regisford	452	46.1	+9.7
Labour	Colin Cook	372	37.9	–11.8
Liberal Democrats	Heather Judge	98	10.0	–4.0
Independent	Emily Scaysbrook	59	6.0	N/A
Majority		80	8.2	
Turnout		981	35.3	+2.5
Green gain from Labour		Swing	▲10.8	

=== Littlemore ===
Littlemore
Party	Candidate	Votes	%	±%
IOA	Anne Stares	814	47.2	N/A
Labour	Sandy Douglas*	730	42.3	–2.0
Green	Tamsin Blaxter	98	5.7	–0.8
Liberal Democrats	Eleonore Vogel	50	2.9	–0.5
TUSC	Rachel Cox	32	1.9	N/A
Majority		84	4.9	
Turnout		1,724	33.7	–6.6
IOA gain from Labour				

=== Lye Valley ===
Lye Valley
Party	Candidate	Votes	%	±%
IOA	Judith Harley	654	44.1	+9.1
Labour	Inka Oshodi	593	40.0	–1.3
Green	James Thorniley	120	8.1	–2.0
Conservative	Timothy Patmore	70	4.7	–4.4
Liberal Democrats	Beverley Joshua	47	3.2	–1.3
Majority		61	4.1	
Turnout		1,484	36.4	+4.0
IOA gain from Labour		Swing	▲5.2	

=== Marston ===
Marston
Party	Candidate	Votes	%	±%
Labour	Mary Clarkson*	868	44.7	+8.3
Green	Kate Robinson	718	37.0	–10.0
Conservative	Duncan Hatfield	288	14.8	+1.4
Liberal Democrats	Daniel Levy	69	3.6	+0.4
Majority		150	7.7	
Turnout		1,943	42.9	–8.7
Labour hold		Swing	▲9.2	

=== Northfield Brook ===
Northfield Brook
Party	Candidate	Votes	%	±%
Labour	Simon Ottino	392	40.3	–26.3
IOA	Susana De Sousa	385	39.6	N/A
Green	David Newman	68	7.0	–1.3
Conservative	Paul Sims	68	7.0	–7.0
Liberal Democrats	Rosemary Morlin	37	3.8	–3.1
TUSC	Rosie Douglas-Brown	23	2.4	–1.9
Majority		7	0.7	
Turnout		973	22.4	+1.8
Labour hold				

=== Osney and St Thomas ===
Osney and St Thomas
Party	Candidate	Votes	%	±%
Labour	Susanna Pressel*	902	54.5	+8.0
Green	Sarah Edwards	567	34.3	–13.4
Liberal Democrats	Adrian Rosser	100	6.0	N/A
Conservative	Caleb Van Ryneveld	85	5.1	–0.7
Majority		335	20.3	
Turnout		1,654	37.8	–6.8
Labour hold		Swing	▲10.7	

=== Quarry and Risinghurst ===
Quarry and Risinghurst
Party	Candidate	Votes	%	±%
Liberal Democrats	Roz Smith*	868	34.7	+9.8
Labour Co-op	James Taylor	861	34.5	–22.7
IOA	Sandra Ramcharan	512	20.5	N/A
Green	Liz Taylor	153	6.1	–1.9
Conservative	Daniel Stafford	105	4.2	–5.6
Majority		7	0.3	
Turnout		2,499	48.4	+1.5
Liberal Democrats hold		Swing	▲16.3	

=== Rose Hill and Iffley ===
Rose Hill and Iffley
Party	Candidate	Votes	%	±%
IOA	David Henwood	870	44.1	N/A
Labour	Michele Paule	814	41.2	–5.3
Green	Heather Stallard	159	8.1	–5.7
Conservative	Jennifer Jackson	61	3.1	–3.3
Liberal Democrats	Katherine Norman	56	2.8	–1.9
TUSC	Ruben Simwogerere	14	0.7	±0.0
Majority		56	2.8	
Turnout		1,974	43.6	+3.0
IOA gain from Labour				

=== St Clement's ===
St Clement's
Party	Candidate	Votes	%	±%
Green	Alex Powell	524	32.9	+12.3
IOA	Sal Naqvi	507	31.8	N/A
Labour	Jesse Erlam	475	29.8	–16.2
Liberal Democrats	Geraldine Coggins	62	3.9	–3.2
TUSC	James Bonner	25	1.6	–0.1
Majority		17	1.1	N/A
Turnout		1,593	38.9	+3.3
Green gain from Labour				

=== St Mary's ===
St Mary's
Party	Candidate	Votes	%	±%
Green	Chris Jarvis*	890	46.6	+1.3
Labour	Matthew Leigh	518	27.1	–2.0
IOA	John Skinner	409	21.4	–0.7
Liberal Democrats	Richard Whelan	43	2.3	–1.2
Conservative	George Robinson	28	1.5	N/A
TUSC	Orlando Munoz	22	1.2	N/A
Majority		372	19.5	
Turnout		1,910	37.9	–4.9
Green hold		Swing	▲1.7	

=== Summertown ===
Summertown
Party	Candidate	Votes	%	±%
Liberal Democrats	Theodore Jupp	662	38.3	–8.1
Labour	Paul Shuter	589	34.0	–1.8
Conservative	David Pope	278	16.1	+5.0
Green	Indrani Sigamany	201	11.6	+4.9
Majority		73	4.2	
Turnout		1,730	41.4	–6.9
Liberal Democrats hold		Swing	▼3.2	

=== Temple Cowley ===
Temple Cowley
Party	Candidate	Votes	%	±%
Independent	Mohammed Azad	888	48.6	+1.2
Labour Co-op	Charlie Hicks	657	35.9	–4.1
Green	Richard Scrase	129	7.1	+0.9
Liberal Democrats	Tony Brett	71	3.9	+0.7
Conservative	Fay Sims	52	2.8	–0.4
Workers Party	Boris Fedorov	31	1.7	N/A
Majority		231	12.6	
Turnout		1,828	38.4	–1.9
Independent gain from Labour		Swing	▲2.7	

=== Walton Manor ===
Walton Manor
Party	Candidate	Votes	%	±%
Labour Co-op	James Fry*	837	57.9	+7.1
Liberal Democrats	Liz Wade	246	17.0	–11.6
Green	Chris Goodall	232	16.0	+4.4
Conservative	Penelope Lenon	131	9.1	+0.1
Majority		591	40.9	
Turnout		1,446	42.2	–0.9
Labour Co-op hold		Swing	▲9.4	

=== Wolvercote ===
Wolvercote
Party	Candidate	Votes	%	±%
Liberal Democrats	Steve Goddard*	839	50.3	–5.4
Labour	Andrew Siantonas	383	22.9	+1.9
Conservative	Daniel Campbell	276	16.5	+2.7
Green	Philippa Lanchbery	171	10.2	+0.7
Majority		456	27.3	
Turnout		1,669	37.5	–10.3
Liberal Democrats hold		Swing	▼3.7	

== By-elections ==
=== Marston ===
Marston by-Election 18 July 2024
Party	Candidate	Votes	%	±%
Green	Kate Robinson	640	34.5	−3.5
IOA	Nasreen Majeed	596	32.1	New
Labour	Charlotte Vinnicombe	495	26.7	–18.0
Conservative	Duncan Hatfield	70	3.8	–11.0
Liberal Democrats	Kathy Norman	55	3.0	–0.6
Majority		44	2.4	
Turnout		1,856	39.4	−3.5
Green hold		Swing		

=== Headington Hill & Northway ===
Headington Hill & Northway by-election: 1 May 2025
Party	Candidate	Votes	%	±%
Labour	James Taylor	461	36.8	–16.9
IOA	Nasreen Majeed	445	35.5	N/A
Green	Stephen Hurt	158	12.6	–5.2
Conservative	Eric Sukumaran	98	7.8	–9.1
Liberal Democrats	Hana Packford	62	4.9	–6.7
TUSC	Agnieszka Kowalska	30	2.4	N/A
Majority		16	1.3	–34.7
Turnout		1,254	31.3	+1.5
Labour hold				
