= Fred Bakewell =

English cricketer

Personal information
- Full name: Alfred Harry Bakewell
- Born: 2 November 1908; Walsall, Staffordshire, England
- Died: 23 January 1983 (aged 74); Westbourne, Dorset, England
- Batting: Right-handed
- Bowling: Right-arm medium

International information
- National side: England
- Test debut: 27 June 1931 v New Zealand
- Last Test: 20 August 1935 v South Africa

Career statistics
Competition	Test	First-class
Matches	6	250
Runs scored	409	14,570
Batting average	45.44	33.96
100s/50s	1/3	31/74
Top score	107	257
Balls bowled	18	1,601
Wickets	0	22
Bowling average	–	57.77
5 wickets in innings	–	0
10 wickets in match	–	0
Best bowling	–	2/17
Catches/stumpings	3/–	225/–
- Source: Cricinfo, 16 April 2023

Alfred Harry "Fred" Bakewell (2 November 1908 – 23 January 1983) was an English cricketer. Playing for Northamptonshire and England, he was an opening batsman who was renowned as one of the most exciting players of his time, largely owing to his unorthodox methods, which allowed him to play some of the most brilliant innings in county cricket, despite the fact that his county, Northamptonshire, was exceptionally weak throughout his career: he was always the only class batsman in the team in the years before his career was ended by a serious car accident in 1936.

His stance was perhaps the most "two-eyed" known in the history of the game, with his right shoulder typically turned so far round as to be facing mid-off, and he gripped the bat with the hands at the extreme ends of the handle. Such a stance would naturally lead to a defensive player who only had strokes on the leg side and would be dull and ugly. Bakewell, however, owing to his superb footwork and amazing dexterity in moving the bat, could and did easily place himself far wide of the leg stump for a ball on off stump. This allowed Bakewell to produce some of the most remarkable strokes, such as cutting sharp off-breaks pitched on middle stump and difficult hooks of short-pitched balls. Though his defence was suspect in his early days, he did work on this problem with considerable success.

He first played for Northamptonshire in 1928, and made an immediate impact with five catches on his first-class debut against Essex – Bakewell remained one of the best close fielders throughout his career, taking eight catches in the return with Essex. In 1929 he reached 1000 runs and the following year made a brilliant 204 against Somerset. With Jack Hobbs having retired the following year, Bakewell was seen as the best young prospect open the England innings with the incomparable Herbert Sutcliffe. He batted well until he allowed himself to be run out rather than Sutcliffe, but did not retain his place.

In 1933, however, Bakewell reached his highest point, twice in successive matches breaking the record for Northamptonshire's highest innings, and doing so in spectacular style with seemingly impossible strokes. Against the short, fast "bodyline" bowling of Manny Martindale in the third Test, Bakewell's dexterity allowed him to play a skillful, even solid innings of 107 – his only Test hundred, but sufficient to give him an average of 45 for six Tests. He was not at his best in a 1933–1934 tour of India and Ceylon, and the weaknesses of his unorthodox style against leg spin meant he did not get a chance against the Australians in 1934.

In 1935, though he had such poor support that Northamptonshire only twice reached 300 in an innings and in one game against Worcestershire he scored 141 out of 199 before being ninth out, Bakewell improved considerably upon his 1934 form and played with considerable success in two Tests against South Africa. Northamptonshire's dependence upon him was starkly seen in that he averaged 42 an innings and nobody else did better than 23. The following year he was not as consistent, but in the last match he played a magnificent unbeaten innings of 241 against the strong bowling of Derbyshire – who had sealed their only ever County Championship title – to almost give Northamptonshire an elusive victory.

However, on the return journey from Chesterfield a horrible accident occurred when the car in which Bakewell and teammate Reggie Northway were travelling flipped over. Northway was killed and Bakewell's right arm was so badly damaged that, despite considerable efforts at rehabilitating this arm through extremely specialised treatment (involving electric shocks designed to restore consciousness) during 1937 and 1938, he was never able to play cricket again, although hopes for his recovery existed as late as 1939. Indeed, he vanished completely from the public eye for the rest of his life.
