= Independent Oxford Alliance =

Political party in Oxford

- Leader: Anne Gwinnett
- Registered: January 30, 2024
- Ideology: Localism; Opposition to LTNs
- Colors: Purple and Yellow
- Oxford City Council: 4 / 48
- Oxfordshire County Council (Oxford seats): 1 / 13

Website
- https://independentoxfordalliance.org/

The Independent Oxford Alliance (IOA) is a British political party based in Oxford founded in 2023 to contest the 2024 Oxford City Council election. It currently has four members on the city council and one on Oxfordshire County Council, and unsuccessfully ran a candidate in Oxford East at the 2024 United Kingdom general election.

The party is opposed to the use of low traffic neighbourhoods (LTNs) to reduce car use within Oxford, as well as other related measures such as bus gates and the expansion of the Oxford zero emission zone.

== History ==
The Independent Oxford Alliance was launched in November 2023 but was not formally registered with the Electoral Commission until 30 January 2024.

In the run up to the 2024 Oxford City Council election the party was criticised in an open letter by Anneliese Dodds, the incumbent MP for Oxford East, and Susan Brown, the leader of the council, for posts made on social media by party chair Anne Gwinnett and candidate for Barton and Sandhills Chaka Artwell. Dodds called the behaviour of some senior figures in the party "appalling", saying the views expressed by these individuals would "shock the vast majority of Oxford residents". Gwinnet called the letter an attempt to "distract attention" and "a coordinated political attack".

In the 2024 city council elections the party stood candidates in 10 of the 24 wards, concentrating its efforts in East Oxford and Cowley. It won in four of them: Lye Valley, Rose Hill and Iffley, Littlemore, and Cowley.

At the 2024 general election, the party fielded a candidate in Oxford East: David Henwood, councillor for Rose Hill and Iffley. He came fifth with 2,381 votes, 6% of the total, saving his deposit.

The IOA also ran a candidate, Nasreen Majeed, in the July 2024 Marston by-election to Oxford City Council. Majeed came second with 32.1% of the vote, 44 votes short of the winning Green candidate Kate Robinson.

At the 2025 Oxfordshire County Council election, the IOA won one seat in the division of Rose Hill and Littlemore, represented by David Henwood. The party contested nine of the thirteen divisions within Oxford, receiving 5,161 votes in total. On the same day, the party contested the city council by election in Headington Hill and Northway. Nasreen Majeed, the IOA candidate, came second, 16 votes behind the winning Labour candidate James Taylor.

In the aftermath of the election the Independent Oxford Alliance, together with the Conservative Party and independent councillor Saj Malik, formed the "Oxfordshire Alliance" group within the county council. Oxfordshire Alliance sits as an opposition group on the council.

The party stood five candidates in the 2026 Oxford City Council election but won no additional seats on the council.

== Platform ==
The party has not published a formal manifesto but describes its five "shared priorities" as:

- transport
- housing
- care and wellbeing
- education
- "open for business"

== Electoral performance ==
=== UK general elections ===
Election	Constituency	Candidate	Position	Votes	%
2024	Oxford East	David Henwood	5th	2,381	6.1%

=== Oxford City Council elections ===
Election	Seats	±	Position	Total votes	%	Control
2024	4 / 48 (Note: 25 seats were up for election. The IOA stood in 10.)	▲4	4th	6,200	15.5%	No overall control
2026	4 / 48 (Note: 24 seats were up for election. The IOA stood in 5.)	Steady	4th	1,951	4.6%	No overall control

==== City Council by-elections ====
Year	Ward	Candidate	Position	Votes	%
2024	Marston	Nasreen Majeed	2nd	596	32.1
2025	Headington Hill and Northway	Nasreen Majeed	2nd	445	35.5

=== Oxfordshire County Council elections ===
Election	Seats	±	Position	Total votes	%	Control
2025	1 / 13 (Oxford seats) (Note: 69 seats were up for election in total, 13 of which cover Oxford.)	▲1	5th (Note: Joint with Reform UK and the Henley Residents Group.)	5,161	2.7%	Liberal Democrat majority
