= Tim Bearder =

British politician

Leader of Oxfordshire County Council

Tim Bearder is a British Liberal Democrat politician who serves as Leader of the Oxfordshire County Council since May 2026.

== Personal life ==
He was educated at Bicester Community College and Plymouth University before employment as a Broadcast Journalist with BBC News (Aug 2001 - Nov 2012), running The Download which later became BBC Introducing in Oxfordshire.

== Political career ==
A Lib Dem councillor on Oxfordshire County Council and that council's leader since May 2026, Bearder has been an active Liberal Democrat for many years (including as Adult Social Care lead) and stood for election 11 times. This includes standing for Police & Crime Commissioner. Actions since leading the county council have included withdrawing its support for the Thames Valley Mayoral Authority, (reinvigorating that campaign by writing to Andy Burnham), and successfully bringing an injunction against Raise the Colours. He has also served in Hampshire.
