= Oxfordshire County Council =

British administrative authority

Type
- Type: County council

Leadership
- Chair: Ted Fenton, Conservative since 12 May 2026
- Leader: Tim Bearder, Liberal Democrat since 20 May 2026
- Chief Executive: Martin Reeves since March 2023

Structure
- Seats: 69 councillors
- Political groups: Administration (35) Liberal Democrats (35) Other parties (34) Labour (12) Conservative (9) Green (7) Reform (1) Henley Residents (1) IOA (1) Independent (3)
- Length of term: 4 years

Elections
- Voting system: First past the post
- Last election: 1 May 2025

Motto
- Sapere aude (Dare to be wise)

Meeting place
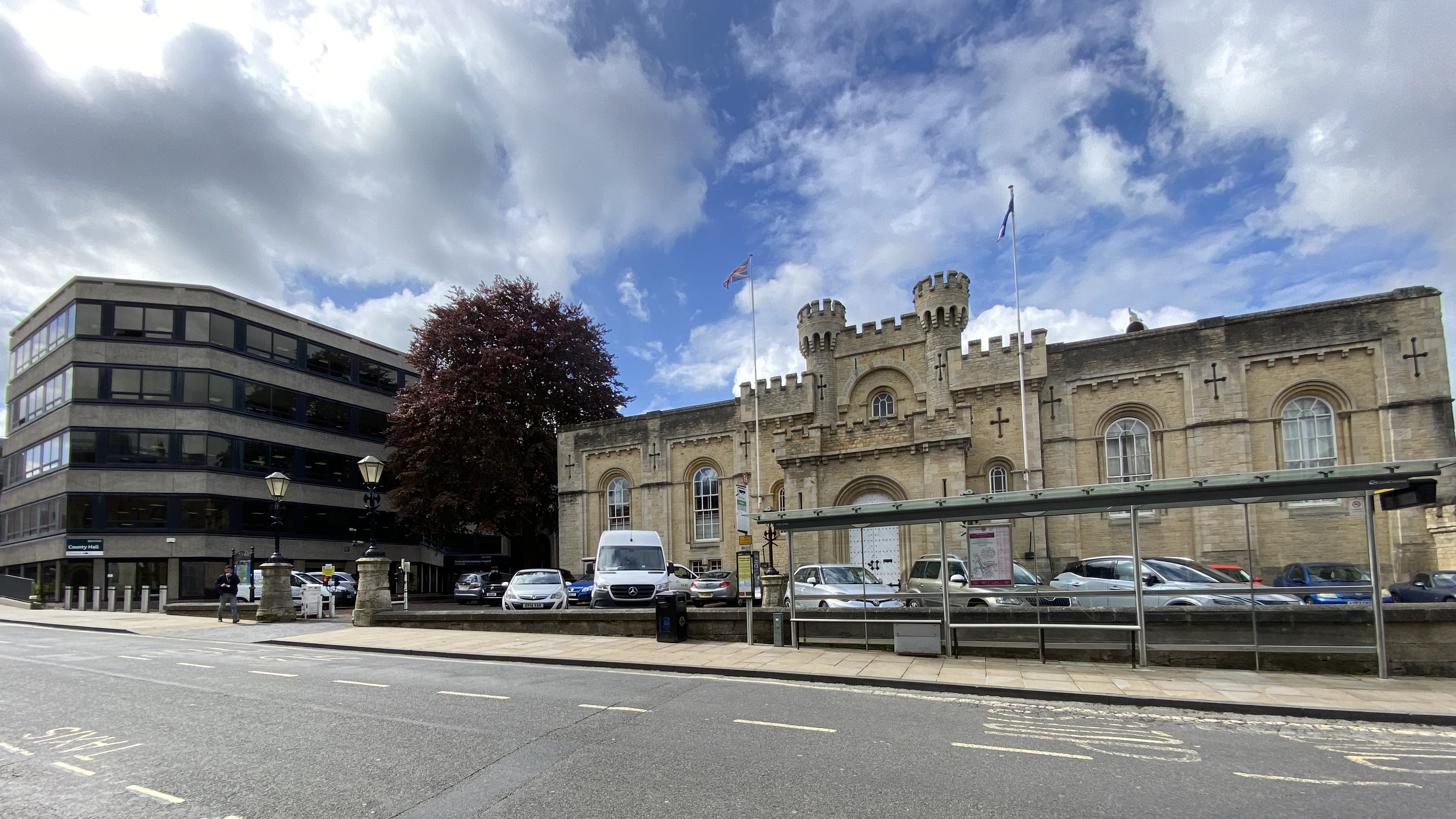
- County Hall, New Road, Oxford, OX1 1ND

Website
- www.oxfordshire.gov.uk

Oxfordshire County Council is the county council (upper-tier local authority) for the non-metropolitan county of Oxfordshire in the South East of England. Established in 1889, it is an elected body responsible for most strategic local government services in the county.

Oxfordshire County Council provides a wide range of services, including education (schools, libraries and youth services), social services, public health, highway maintenance, waste disposal, emergency planning, consumer protection and town and country planning for matters to do with minerals, waste, highways and education. This makes it one of the largest employers in Oxfordshire, with a gross expenditure budget of £856.2 million in 2021–22.

== History ==
Elected county councils were first introduced in England and Wales in 1889 as a result of the Local Government Act 1888, taking over administrative functions until then carried out by unelected magistrates at the quarter sessions.

The areas covered by county councils were termed administrative counties. They were based on the historic counties but subject to adjustments to ensure that each urban sanitary district was contained in a single administrative county, and excluding any boroughs considered large enough to run their own county-level functions, known as county boroughs. In Oxfordshire's case, there were three urban sanitary districts which straddled the county boundary prior to 1889: Banbury was partly in Northamptonshire, and Abingdon and Oxford both straddled the boundary between Oxfordshire and Berkshire. The county boundary was adjusted to place Banbury and Oxford entirely in Oxfordshire and Abingdon entirely in Berkshire.

The first elections were held in January 1889. Preliminary meetings were held during February and March 1889 at which several aldermen were elected. The council formally came into being on 1 April 1889, on which day it held its first official meeting at County Hall in Oxford, the courthouse which also served as the meeting place for the quarter sessions. Victor Child Villiers, 7th Earl of Jersey, a Conservative peer, was appointed the first chairman of the county council.

The city of Oxford was initially included in the administrative county, but seven months later, on 9 November 1889, the city became a county borough, making it independent from the county council and removing it from the administrative county, whilst remaining part of the geographical county of Oxfordshire.

Schools (both primary and secondary) were added to the County Council's responsibilities in 1902, and until the 1990s it was also responsible for operating Colleges of Further Education.

Local government was significantly reformed in 1974 under the Local Government Act 1972. Oxfordshire was redesignated as a non-metropolitan county and had its boundaries enlarged to gain an area between the River Thames and the Berkshire Downs hills which had previously been in Berkshire. The city of Oxford was also brought back under the county council's authority. The lower tier of local government was reorganised as part of the same reforms. Prior to 1974 it had comprised numerous boroughs, urban districts and rural districts. After 1974 the lower tier within the redefined Oxfordshire comprised five non-metropolitan districts: Cherwell, Oxford, South Oxfordshire, Vale of White Horse, and West Oxfordshire.

== Abolition ==
In July 2026, the UK Government announced that it intends to reorganise local government in Oxfordshire by April 2028. Three unitary authority areas will cover the county, one of which will straddle the boundary with Berkshire.

Greater Oxford will be larger than the current Oxford district and cover the city and its hinterland. Northern Oxfordshire will combine most of the current Cherwell and West Oxfordshire districts. Ridgeway will combine most of the current South Oxfordshire and Vale of White Horse districts and the West Berkshire district.

== Political control ==
The council was under Liberal Democrat majority control after the 2025 election but in 2026 two Liberal Democrats left the party, leaving the council under no overall control with the recent byelection it is now back under majority Libdem control..

Political control of the council since the 1974 reforms has been as follows:

| Party in control | Years |
|---|---|
| Conservative | 1974–1985 |
| No overall control | 1985–2005 |
| Conservative | 2005–2013 |
| No overall control | 2013–2025 |
| Liberal Democrats | 2025–2026 |
| No overall control | 2026–2026 |
| Liberal Democrats | 2026– |

=== Leadership ===
The leaders of the council since 2001 have been:

| Councillor | Party | From | To |
|---|---|---|---|
| Keith Mitchell | Conservative | 2001 | May 2012 |
| Ian Hudspeth | Conservative | 15 May 2012 | May 2021 |
| Liz Leffman | Liberal Democrats | 18 May 2021 | 12 May 2026 |
| Tim Bearder | Liberal Democrats | 20 May 2026 | |

=== Composition ===
Following the 2025 election and subsequent changes up to July 2026, the composition of the council was:

| Party | Seats |
|---|---|
| Liberal Democrats | 35 |
| Labour | 12 |
| Conservative | 9 |
| Green | 7 |
| Reform | 1 |
| Henley Residents | 1 |
| IOA | 1 |
| Independent | 3 |
| Total | 69 |

The Conservatives, the Independent Oxford Alliance councillor, and two independent councillors form the 'Oxfordshire Alliance' group. As this group and the Labour group have the same number of seats, there are therefore two official opposition groups on the council.

== Elections ==
Since 1889, members have been elected for a term of office, with elections held all together (initially every three years, later every four years) by the "first past the post" system. Until the 1970s, the elected members chose aldermen, whose term of office was for six years, and who once appointed were also voting members of the council. This form of membership was ended by the Local Government Act 1972, so that after 1974 only honorary (that is, non-voting) aldermen could be appointed.

The Local Government Boundary Commission for England (LGBCE) reviewed the electoral arrangements for Oxfordshire County Council in 2024.

The review decided that with effect from the elections on Thursday, 1 May 2025 and there would be 69 councillors, one for each of the new electoral divisions. This represents an increase of six councillors across the county.

== Premises ==
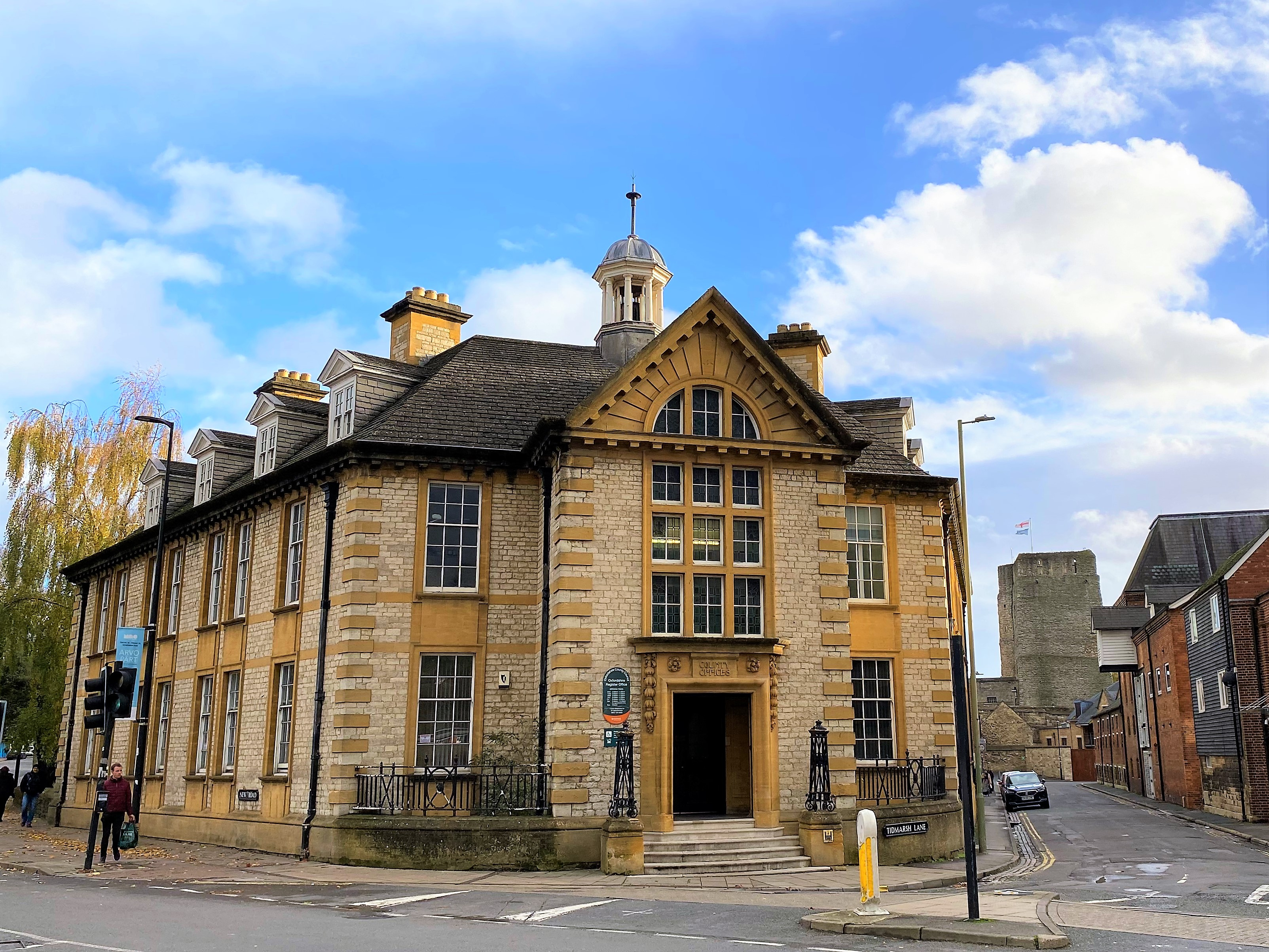
County Offices (now the Register Office), 1 Tidmarsh Lane: Council's main offices 1912–1973

The council is based at County Hall on New Road in Oxford. The old part of the building was a courthouse built in 1841, which had served as the meeting place of the quarter sessions which preceded the county council. In 1912 a new building called County Offices was built at the corner of New Road and Tidmarsh Lane to provide the council's offices; meetings continued to be held at County Hall.

The County Offices were replaced in 1973 when a large extension was added to the 1841 County Hall, bringing the council's main offices and meeting place onto the same site.

== Notable members ==
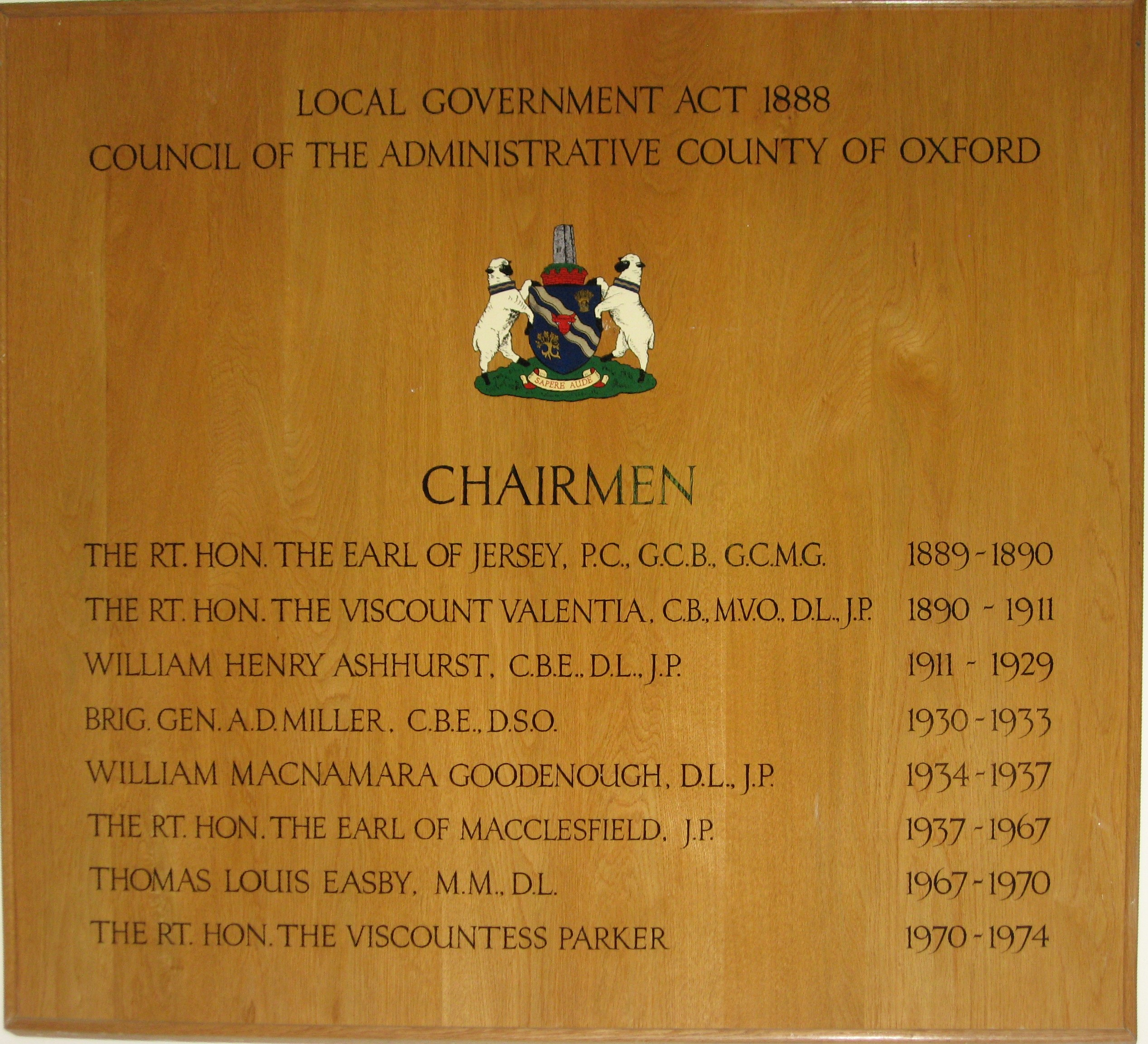
Oxfordshire County Council Chairs, 1889 to 1974

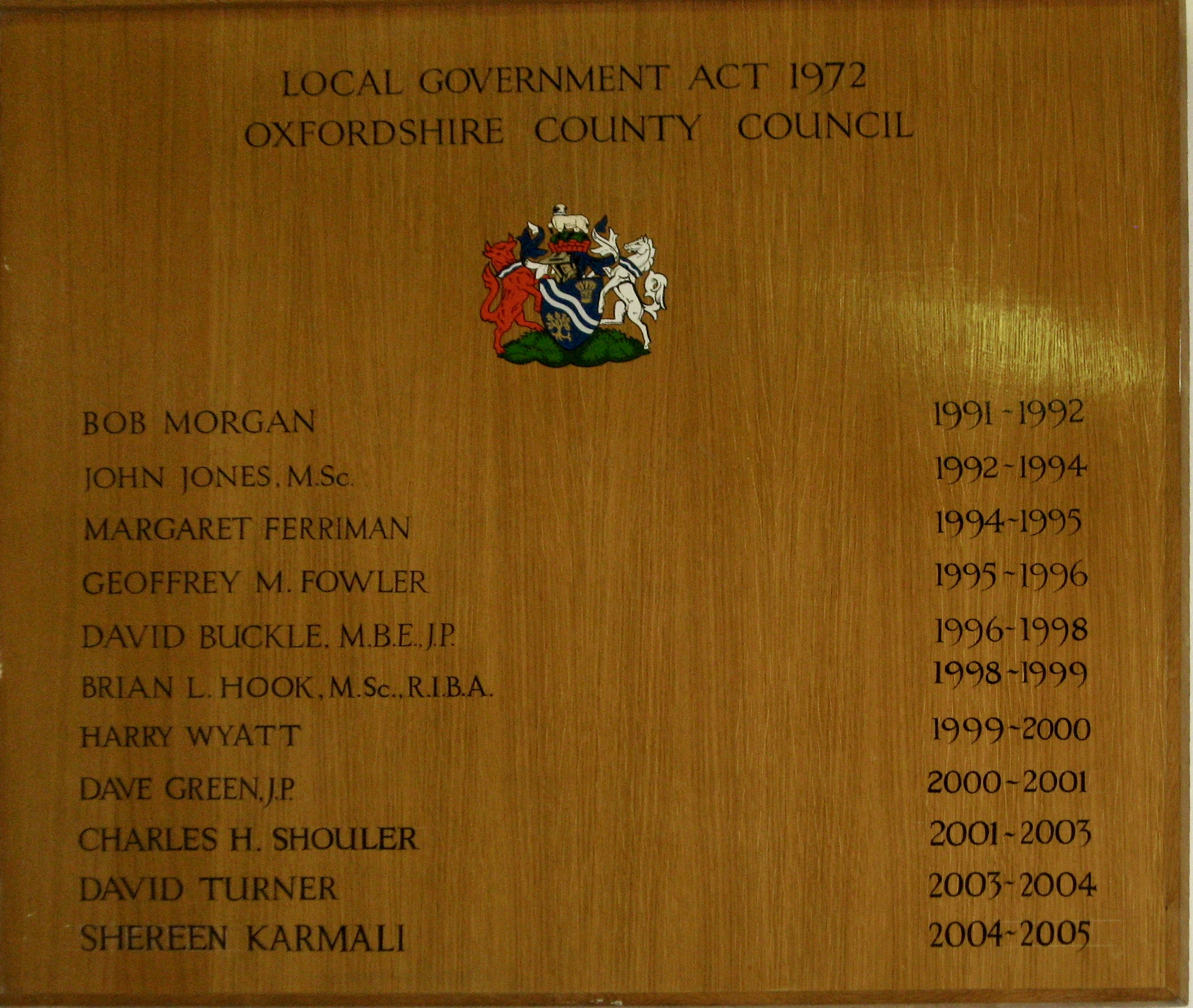
Oxfordshire County Council Chairs, 1991 to 2005

- Sir Jervoise Athelstane Baines, member 1917–22, later Indian Civil Service administrator
- Jonathan Baume, member 1974–77, trade unionist
- Catherine Bearder MEP, member
- Angela Billingham, member 1993–94, later Baroness Billingham
- William Bradshaw, Baron Bradshaw, member 1993–2008
- Peter Butler, member 1985–89, later Member of Parliament for North East Milton Keynes
- Sherman Stonor, 6th Baron Camoys, member
- Julia Drown, member 1989–96, later Member of Parliament for South Swindon
- Michael Patrick Fogarty, member 1981–89, academic
- Olive Gibbs, chairman 1974–1975 and 1981–1982
- Simon Hoare, member, later Member of Parliament for North Dorset
- John Howell, member 2004–09, later Member of Parliament for Henley
- Caroline Lucas, member 1993–97, later Member of Parliament for Brighton Pavilion
- George Parker, 7th Earl of Macclesfield, chairman 1937–70
- James Plaskitt, member 1985–97, later Member of Parliament for Warwick and Leamington
- Geoffrey Somerset, 6th Baron Raglan, member 1988–1993
- John Redwood, member 1973–77, later Member of Parliament for Wokingham
- Larry Sanders, member 2005–13, Green Party Spokesperson for Health and brother of US Senator Bernie Sanders

== Meat and dairy ban controversy ==
In 2021, the Liberal Democrat/Green/Labour administration moved a motion at Full Council to serve only plant-based (vegan) meals at all council-catered events and meetings, and vegan school meals in primary schools two days a week as part of its climate change action policy. The move was unsuccessfully fought by the Conservative opposition. This policy was controversial and drew protests from livestock farmers and TV presenter Jeremy Clarkson, who owns a farm in the county. As a result of the controversy, when the motion came to the council's Cabinet for ratification in March 2022, the proposals were scaled back to cover just seven council meetings and school meals only one day a week. In November 2022, the Conservatives unsuccessfully sought to cancel vegan meals at council-catered events, which cost £6,000 annually and are purchased from a Kidlington business which sources food from Woodstock.

== See also ==
- List of electoral wards in Oxfordshire
