= Reginald Northway =

English cricketer

Personal information
- Full name: Reginald Philip Northway
- Born: 14 August 1906; Ceylon
- Died: 26 August 1936 (aged 30); Kibworth, Leicestershire, England
- Batting: Right-handed
- Role: Batsman
- Relatives: Edward Northway (brother)

Domestic team information
- Years: Team
- 1929–1933: Somerset
- 1936: Northamptonshire
- FC debut: 8 June 1929 Somerset v Gloucestershire
- Last FC: 25 August 1936 Northants v Derbyshire

Career statistics
Competition	First-class
Matches	34
Runs scored	806
Batting average	15.50
100s/50s	0/2
Top score	75*
Catches/stumpings	5/–
- Source: CricketArchive, 23 August 2009

Reginald Philip Northway (14 August 1906 – 26 August 1936) was an English cricketer who played first-class cricket as an amateur for Somerset and Northamptonshire. He was born in Ceylon in 1906.

A defensive right-handed opening batsman and a good outfielder, Reggie Northway followed his older brother Edward in playing occasional games for Somerset from the 1929 season up to 1933. In his second match, against Cambridge University at Fenner's in 1930, he made an unbeaten 75 which remained his highest first-class score. He played in 12 first-class games for Somerset in 1930, but only a handful over the next three years.

Northway reappeared in first-class cricket for Northamptonshire in the 1936 season. Northamptonshire was a very weak side at this time, finishing last in the County Championship and failing to record a victory for four years from May 1935 to May 1939. Northway opened the batting for more than half of the matches in the 1936 season, batting alongside Fred Bakewell, the England Test batsman and the county's one genuine first-class player. In 17 matches he scored just 429 runs, with just one score of over 50 – a 58 against his former county, Somerset, at Bath, when he batted for three hours.

Northway is perhaps best remembered for the tragic end to his cricket career and that of his opening partner Bakewell. Travelling home from the final match of the season, where Northamptonshire had made a surprisingly good showing against the season's County Champions, Derbyshire, Northway's car overturned on the A6 road at Kibworth, Leicestershire. Northway was flung from the car and killed, his body being found in a roadside ditch. Bakewell, who had made an unbeaten 241 in Northamptonshire's second innings, had his arm crushed and despite optimism over several following years he never played first-class cricket again.
