= Alfred Northey =

English clergyman and cricketer

- Born: Alfred Edward Northey; 2 August 1838; Uxbridge, Middlesex, England
- Died: 24 January 1911 (aged 72); Torquay, Devon, England
- Occupation: Clergyman

Alfred Edward Northey (2 August 1838 – 24 January 1911) was an English clergyman and a cricketer who played first-class cricket for Cambridge University and for another amateur side between 1857 and 1860. He was born at Uxbridge, Middlesex and died at Torquay, Devon.

Northey was the son of Colonel W. B. Northey and was educated at Harrow School and Trinity College, Cambridge. He first played first-class cricket in a match for "the Gentlemen of Kent and Sussex" against the "Gentlemen of England" in 1857; as an opening batsman he made 23 and 32. He played only a single game for Cambridge University team in 1858, and in 1859, his single first-class match was the annual University Match against Oxford University in which he batted in the lower order. In 1860, he played three times for the university team and in the first of these appearances, against the Cambridge Town Club, he made an innings of 40 which was his highest first-class score. His last first-class game the University Match of 1860 in which he batted at No 9 in the first innings and did not bat at all in the second innings, when Cambridge won a very low-scoring game by three wickets.

Northey graduated from Cambridge University with a Bachelor of Arts degree in 1861 and was ordained as a priest in the Church of England. He was curate at All Saints' Church, Huntingdon from 1862 to 1864 and at St Martin-in-the-Fields in London from 1864 to 1869. From 1870 he was principal of Hockerill Training College for Schoolmistresses until he became vicar of Offley in Hertfordshire in 1881. Northey became the vicar at Rickmansworth in 1884 and remained there until 1898 when he retired; he was also rural dean of Watford from 1896. After retirement, he briefly acted as a chaplain in Tangier, Morocco and after settling in Devon was a licensed priest in the diocese of Exeter, though without an incumbency.

As a student to 1861 Northey was a captain in the 3rd Cambridgeshire Rifle Volunteers, part of the Volunteer Force. While at Hockerill, he published a book in 1872 on Pupil Teachers: Their Training and Instruction.
