= Edward Northway =

English cricketer

Personal information
- Full name: Edward George Northway
- Born: 30 October 1901; Ceylon
- Died: 4 August 1966 (aged 64); Marylebone, London, England
- Role: Batsman
- Relatives: Reginald Northway (brother)

Domestic team information
- Years: Team
- 1925–1926: Somerset
- 1927–1936: Royal Air Force
- FC debut: 23 May 1925 Somerset v Derbyshire
- Last FC: 28 August 1928 RAF v Royal Navy

Career statistics
Competition	First-class
Matches	11
Runs scored	265
Batting average	18.92
100s/50s	0/2
Top score	83
Catches/stumpings	4/–
- Source: CricketArchive, 27 November 2013

Edward George Northway (30 October 1901 – 4 August 1966) was a first-class cricketer for Somerset and for the Royal Air Force.

== Career ==
Northway played five County Championship matches for Somerset in 1925 and three in 1926 as a right-handed middle-order batsman. In only one game, his second, did he make any major impact. Playing against Worcestershire at Worcester, Northway joined Jack White with Somerset 43 for four wickets. He added 104 with White, "adopting stern defensive measures", according to Wisden, then stayed through to the end of the innings at 224, remaining unbeaten on 55. The total was enough for Somerset to win the match with an innings to spare.

In 1927 and 1928, Northway appeared for the Royal Air Force in first-class matches against other branches of the services. In the 1928 match with the Royal Navy at The Oval, opening the first innings, he made 83, which was his highest score in first-class cricket. As late as 1936, he was appearing for the RAF in non-first-class games.

Northway's younger brother, Reggie, also played for Somerset and for Northamptonshire and was killed in a road accident on the way back from a Northamptonshire match in 1936.
