= Northway, Oxford =

Housing Estate in Oxford, England

Coordinates: 51.771°N 1.221°W

Northway
- Housing Estate
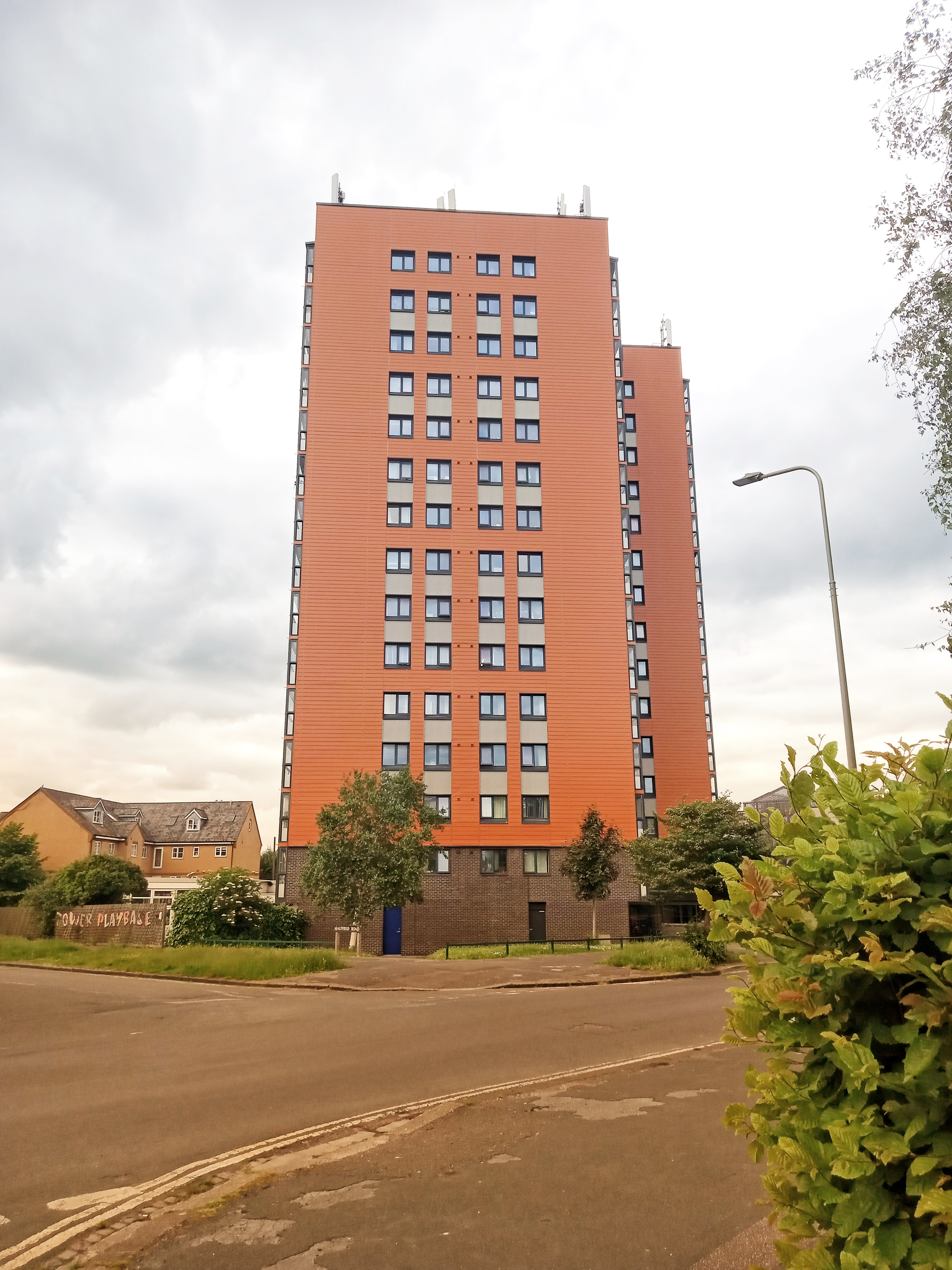
- Plowman Tower in Northway

- Location within Oxfordshire
- Population: 6,500 (Includes Headington Hill) (2021 Census)
- OS grid reference: SP538081
- District: Oxford
- Shire county: Oxfordshire
- Region: South East
- Country: England
- Sovereign state: United Kingdom
- Post town: Oxford
- Postcode district: OX3
- Dialling code: 01865
- Police: Thames Valley
- Fire: Oxfordshire
- Ambulance: South Central
- UK Parliament: Oxford East

Northway is a suburb in northeast Oxford, England, just inside the Oxford ring road. It is near Marston and the John Radcliffe Hospital. It mainly consists of social housing built by Oxford City Council in the 1950s, though many houses and apartments are now in private ownership.

To the southwest is Headley Way and to the northwest is Marsh Lane.

== History ==
Plowman Tower was built by Oxford City Council in 1965, it was the first tower block in Oxfordshire.

== Amenities ==
There is a Community Centre in Dora Carr Close and a Sports Centre in Maltfield Road. There is a Northway Evangelical Church.

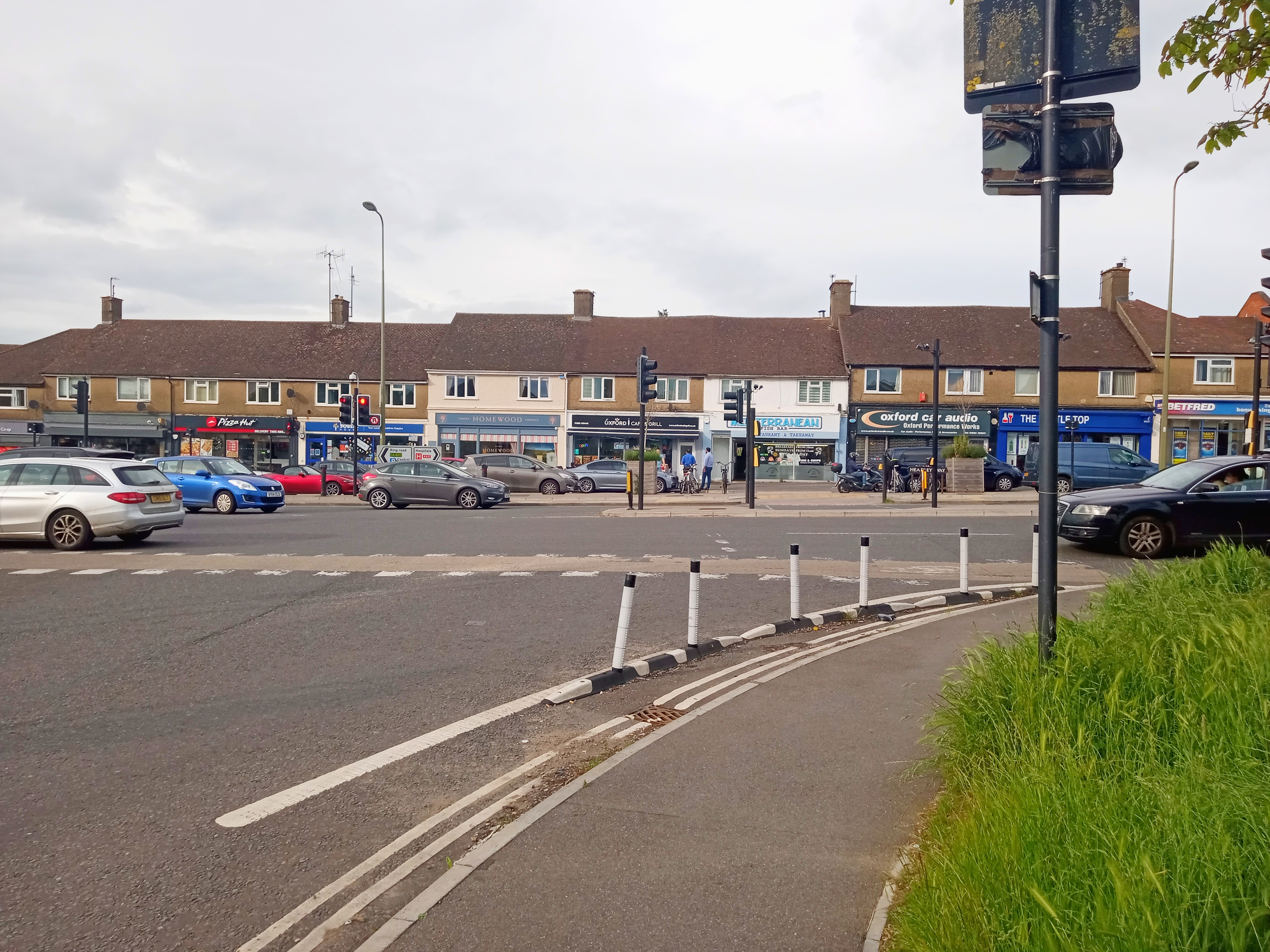
Cherwell Drive Shops
