= Mark Lygo =

61st Lord Mayor of Oxford
- In office 2020–2021
- Deputy: Steve Goddard
- Preceded by: Craig Simmons

Oxford City Councillor for Churchill, Marston and Northway
- Incumbent
- Assumed office May 2008

Personal details
- Born: Oxford
- Party: Labour
- Spouse: yes
- Children: 2
- Occupation: councillor
- Profession: manager

Mark Lygo is a British Labour Party politician and former Lord Mayor of Oxford, England, a position he held from November 2020 to May 2022. Since 2008 he has been a councillor of the Oxford City Council representing the Churchill, Marston and Northway wards for Labour. At the council he has been an executive board member for Sport, Play, Schools Liaison & Olympics.

Since 2013 he has also been an Oxfordshire County Councillor for the Marston & Northway Division in Oxford city, and he was voted Chair of Oxfordshire County Council for 2015/6

His other activities include local school governor, supporter of local charities, etc. He is also chairman of the amateur youth football club Quarry Rovers.

== See also ==
- List of mayors of Oxford
