= George Northey (cricketer) =

English cricketer and British Army officer (1835–1906)

Personal information
- Full name: George Wilbraham Northey
- Born: 28 January 1835; Epsom, Surrey, England
- Died: 12 March 1906 (aged 71); Box, Wiltshire, England
- Batting: Unknown

Career statistics
Competition	First-class
Matches	1
Runs scored	6
Batting average	3.00
100s/50s	–/–
Top score	5
Catches/stumpings	1/–
- Source: Cricinfo, 28 March 2020

George Wilbraham Northey DL JP (28 January 1835 – 12 March 1906) was an English first-class cricketer and British Army officer.

The son of Edward Richard Northey, he was born at Epsom in January 1835. He was a gentlemen cadet at Sandhurst in 1851, with him purchasing the rank of ensign in the Cameronians in September 1853. The following year he purchased the rank of lieutenant. Northey played first-class cricket in 1857, when he played for a combined Gentlemen of Kent and Sussex cricket team against the Gentlemen of England at Canterbury. Batting twice in the match, he was dismissed for a single run in the Gentlemen of Kent and Sussex first-innings by Cecil Fiennes, while in their second-innings he was dismissed for 4 runs by John Parker.

In August 1858, he was appointed to be an instructor of musketry. He married Louisa Barrow in September 1859, with the couple having thirteen children. The following year he was promoted to captain in February 1860 and was appointed an adjutant at a Depot Battalion in October 1864. He was promoted to major in October 1872, before being placed on the retired list in June 1881 with the honorary rank of lieutenant colonel. Northey was appointed as a deputy lieutenant for Wiltshire in April 1884, in addition to serving as a justice of the peace for the county. He was for many years the president of Lansdown Cricket Club at Bristol. Northey died in March 1906 at Ashley Manor at Box, Wiltshire.
