= Oxford City Council =

Local government for the city of Oxford in England

- Half of council elected every other year

Type
- Type: Non-metropolitan district council of Oxford
- Houses: Unicameral
- Term limits: None

History
- Founded: 1 April 1974

Leadership
- Lord Mayor: Chewe Munkonge, Labour since 20 May 2026
- Leader: Susan Brown, Labour since 29 January 2018
- Chief Executive: Caroline Green since February 2021

Structure
- Seats: 48 councillors
- Political groups: Administration (20) Labour (20) Other parties (28) Green (13) Liberal Democrats (9) IOA (4) Independent (2)

Elections
- Voting system: First past the post
- Last election: 7 May 2026
- Next election: TBD

Motto
- Fortis est Veritas (Latin)

Meeting place
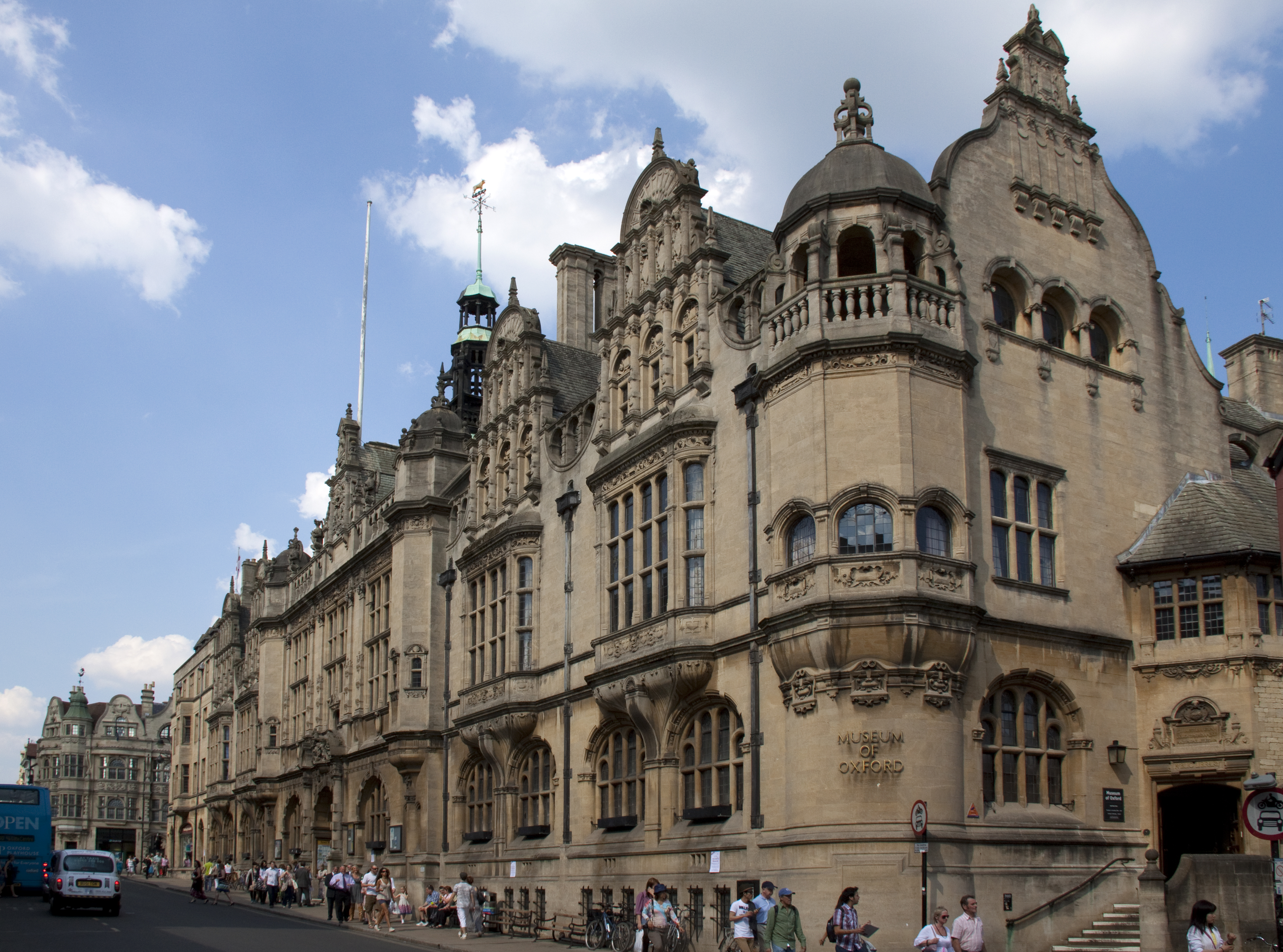
- Town Hall, St Aldate's, Oxford, OX1 1BX

Website
- www.oxford.gov.uk

Oxford City Council is the local authority for the city of Oxford in Oxfordshire, England. Oxford has had a council since medieval times, which has been reformed on numerous occasions. Since 1974, Oxford has been a non-metropolitan district, with county-level functions in the city provided by Oxfordshire County Council.

The city council has been under no overall control since 2023. It is based at Oxford Town Hall.

== History ==
Oxford was an ancient borough, being governed by a corporation from medieval times. The borough gained city status in 1542. It was reformed in 1836 under the Municipal Corporations Act 1835 to become a municipal borough. When elected county councils were created on 1 April 1889, Oxford was initially within the area of Oxfordshire County Council. Seven months later, on 9 November 1889, the city become a county borough, making it independent from the county council. In 1962 the council was given the right to appoint a Lord Mayor.

Local government was reformed across England and Wales in 1974 under the Local Government Act 1972, which established a two-tier structure of local government comprising upper-tier counties and lower-tier districts. Oxford became a non-metropolitan district, and county-level functions passed up to Oxfordshire County Council.

In early 2003, Oxford City Council submitted a bid to become a unitary authority. This was received by the Department for Communities and Local Government, but subsequently rejected.

In 2016, Oxfordshire County Council put forward a 'One Oxfordshire' proposal which would see Oxford City Council and the four other district councils in Oxfordshire abolished and replaced with a single unitary county council for Oxfordshire. In 2017, Oxford City Council voiced their opposition to the proposal, and it was subsequently dropped.

== Governance ==
Oxford City Council provides district-level services. County-level services are provided by Oxfordshire County Council. Some outer parts of the city are also included in civil parishes, which form an additional tier of local government for their areas.

=== Political control ===
The council has been under no overall control since 2023. Since then, it has been run by a Labour minority administration.

The first election to the reconstituted city council following the Local Government Act 1972 was held in 1973. It operated as a shadow authority alongside the outgoing authorities until it came into its powers on 1 April 1974. Political control of the council since then has been as follows:

Party in control	Years
Labour	1974–1976
Conservative	1976–1980
Labour	1980–2000
No overall control	2000–2002
Labour	2002–2004
No overall control	2004–2010
Labour	2010–2023
No overall control	2023–present

=== Leadership ===
Political leadership is provided by the leader of the council; the role of Lord Mayor is largely ceremonial and usually changes hands each year. The leaders since 1998 have been:

Councillor	Party	From	To
Stan Taylor	Labour		Sep 1998
John Tanner	Labour	Oct 1998	May 2000
Corinna Redman	Liberal Democrats	May 2000	May 2002
Alex Hollingsworth	Labour	13 May 2002	May 2006
John Goddard	Liberal Democrats	18 May 2006	May 2008
Bob Price	Labour	15 May 2008	29 Jan 2018
Susan Brown	Labour	29 Jan 2018	

=== Composition ===
Following the 2026 election, the composition of the council was:

Party	Councillors
Labour	20
Green	13
Liberal Democrats	9
Independent Oxford Alliance	2
Independent	2
Total	48

The next election is theoretically due in 2027 but the exact nature and timing of the election will be determined by proposed reforms to local government.

== Premises ==
The city council meets at the Town Hall on the street called St Aldate's in the city centre. The current building was completed in 1897, on a site which had been occupied by Oxford's guildhall since the thirteenth century. Between 1967 and 2022 the council had its main offices at St Aldate's Chambers at 113 St Aldate's, a 1930s building opposite the town hall, but continued to use the town hall for meetings. In 2022 the council moved its offices back into the town hall.

== Elections ==
Since the last boundary changes came into effect for the 2021 election, the council has comprised 48 councillors representing 24 wards, with each ward electing two councillors. Elections are held in alternate years, with half the council (one councillor for each ward) elected each time for a four-year term of office.

== Councillors ==
Oxford City Council is composed of the following councillors as of May 2026:

Note that Councillors notionally subject to re-election post-2028 are likely to in fact complete their terms in 2028 due to anticipated local government reorganisation.

Ward	Name	Party	Next Election	First elected
Barton and Sandhills	Asima Qayyum	Labour	2028	2024
Barton and Sandhills	Mike Rowley	Labour	2030	2010 (by-election)
Blackbird Leys	Lubna Arshad	Labour	2030	2018 (in Cowley Marsh)
Blackbird Leys	Linda Smith	Labour	2028	2014 (by-election)
Carfax and Jericho	Lizzie Diggins	Labour	2028	2021
Carfax and Jericho	Sushila Dhall	Green	2030	2004 (not continuously)
Churchill	Susan Brown	Labour	2030	2014
Churchill	Mark Lygo	Labour	2028	2008
Cowley	Ian Yeatman	IOA	2028	2024
Cowley	Edward Mundy	Green	2030	2021 (as Labour, in Holywell ward)
Cuttleslowe and Sunnymead	Andrew Gant	Liberal Democrats	2028	2014 (in Summertown)
Cuttleslowe and Sunnymead	Laurence Fouweather	Liberal Democrats	2030	2021
Donnington	Rosie Rawle	Green	2030	2022
Donnington	Max Morris	Green	2028	2024
Headington	Mohammed Altaf-Khan	Liberal Democrats	2028	2006 (in Headington Hill and Northway)
Headington	Christopher Smowton	Liberal Democrats	2030	2021
Headington Hill and Northway	James Taylor	Labour	2030	2025 (by-election)
Headington Hill and Northway	Nigel Chapman	Labour	2028	2016
Hinksey Park	Siobhan Lancaster	Labour	2030	2026
Hinksey Park	Anna Railton	Labour	2028	2022 (by-election)
Holywell	Dianne Regisford	Green	2028	2024
Holywell	Alfie Davis	Green	2030	2026
Littlemore	Anne Stares	IOA	2028	2024
Littlemore	Tiago Jorge de Assis Caldeira Cruz Corais	Labour	2030	2018
Lye Valley	Judith Harley	IOA	2028	2024
Lye Valley	James Thorniley	Green	2030	2026
Marston	Mary Clarkson	Labour	2028	1998
Marston	Kate Robinson	Green	2030	2024 (by-election)
Northfield Brook	Trish Elphinstone	Labour	2030	2026
Northfield Brook	Simon Ottino	Labour	2028	2024
Osney and St Thomas	Susanna Pressel	Labour	2028	1996
Osney and St Thomas	Lois Muddiman	Green	2030	2022
Quarry and Risinghurst	Roz Smith	Liberal Democrats	2028	2018
Quarry and Risinghurst	Chewe Munkonge	Labour	2030	2014 (by-election)
Rose Hill and Iffley	David Henwood	IOA	2028	2024
Rose Hill and Iffley	Edward Turner	Labour	2030	2002
St Clement's	Alex Powell	Green	2028	2024
St Clement's	Ahalya Bala	Green	2030	2026
St Mary's	Emily Kerr	Green	2030	2022
St Mary's	Chris Jarvis	Green	2028	2021
Summertown	Theodore Jupp	Liberal Democrats	2028	2024
Summertown	Katherine Miles	Liberal Democrats	2030	2021
Temple Cowley	Mohammed Azad	Independent	2028	2024
Temple Cowley	Sajjad Malik	Independent	2030	2004 (as a Liberal Democrat; later Labour)
Walton Manor	Louise Upton	Labour	2030	2013 (by-election)
Walton Manor	James Fry	Labour	2028	2012
Wolvercote	Steve Goddard	Liberal Democrats	2028	1996
Wolvercote	Elizabeth Turkson-Wood	Liberal Democrats	2030	2026

== Climate change ==
Oxford City Council became the first UK authority to divest from fossil fuel companies in September 2014.

In 2011, the council had reduced their carbon footprint by 25% against a baseline of 2005/6, and continues to reduce carbon emissions from its own estate by 5% year on year.

In 2014, Oxford City Council was named 'Most Sustainable Local Authority' in the Public Sector Sustainability Awards. That same year, both the city and the county council implemented its own low emission zone (LEZ) for buses, making it UK's second LEZ after London because buses accounted for up to 80% of emissions in the city.

The council leads the Low Carbon Oxford network, a collaboration of over 40 organisations working together to reduce emissions in the city by 40% by 2020.

In 2021, both councils agreed to implement a zero emission zone (ZEZ) which came into force in February 2022, the first of its kind in Britain.

They also lead onto delivering the annual Low Carbon Oxford Week festival, which uses culture, creativity and, community to inspire local people to take action on climate change. In 2015, the festival saw over 60 local organisations partner to deliver over 100 events across the city and attract over 40,000 visitors.

In 2023, Oxford City Council voted to serve plant-based, vegan food at council events. Butchers and animal farmers protested the vote, which came after a similar policy was adopted by the Oxfordshire County Council.

=== Energy Superhub Oxford ===
Energy Superhub Oxford is a power optimisation project at Redbridge park and ride. It includes a lithium-ion battery of 48MW/50MWh, a vanadium flow battery of 2MW/5MWh, 20 fast electric vehicle chargers for public use and ground-source heat pumps for residential properties.

== See also ==
- Oxford City Council elections
- Oxford Town Hall
- List of mayors of Oxford
