= Oxford City Council elections =

Local government elections in Oxfordshire, England

Oxford City Council in Oxford, England is elected every two years, with half of the 48 seats in the City Council up for election on each occasion. Elections are held in even-numbered years. Until 2002 the council was elected by thirds.

As vacancies arise between elections, by-elections are held to elect a replacement councillor.

== Council elections ==
Composition of the council
Year	Labour	Conservative	Liberal Democrats (Note: Includes totals for the predecessors of the Liberal Democrats, the Liberal Party and SDP (both of which participated in the Alliance).)	Green (Note: Includes totals for the predecessors of the Green Party of England and Wales, the Ecology Party and Green Party UK.)	IWCA	IOA	Independents & Others	Council control after election
Local government reorganisation; council established (45 seats)
1973	30	12	3	–	–	–	0	Labour
1976	15	30	0	0	–	–	0	Conservative
New ward boundaries (45 seats)
1979	19	26	0	0	–	–	0	Conservative
1980	24	21	0	0	–	–	0	Labour
1982	26	18	1	0	–	–	0	Labour
1983	28	15	2	0	–	–	0	Labour
1984	27	15	3	0	–	–	0	Labour
1986	30	11	4	0	–	–	0	Labour
1987	29	11	5	0	–	–	0	Labour
1988	30	10	5	0	–	–	0	Labour
1990	30	10	5	0	–	–	0	Labour
New ward boundaries (51 seats)
1991	37	9	5	0	–	–	0	Labour
1992	35	10	6	0	–	–	0	Labour
1994	36	7	7	1	–	–	0	Labour
1995	38	4	8	1	0	–	0	Labour
1996	39	0	9	3	0	–	0	Labour
1998	33	0	14	4	0	–	0	Labour
1999	28	0	16	7	0	–	0	Labour
2000	20	1	21	8	1	–	0	No overall control
New ward boundaries (48 seats) (Note: Changed from one-third to half council elections)
2002	29	0	15	3	1	–	0	Labour
2004	20	0	18	5	3	–	2	No overall control
2006	17	0	19	7	4	–	1	No overall control
2008	23	0	16	7	2	–	0	No overall control
2010	25	0	17	5	0	–	1	Labour
2012	29	0	13	5	0	–	1	Labour
2014	33	0	8	6	0	–	1	Labour
2016	35	0	8	4	0	–	1	Labour
2018	36	0	9	2	0	–	1	Labour
New ward boundaries (48 seats)
2021	34	0	9	3	–	–	2	Labour
2022	32	0	9	6	–	–	1	Labour
2024	20	0	9	8	–	4	7	No overall control
2026	20	0	9	13	–	4	2	No overall control

== Results maps ==
2002 results map

2004 results map

2006 results map

2008 results map

2010 results map

2012 results map

2014 results map

2016 results map

2018 results map

2021 results map

2022 results map

2024 results map

2026 results map

== By-election results ==
=== 2024-2028 ===
Headington Hill and Northway By-Election 1 May 2025
Party	Candidate	Votes	%	±%
Labour	James Taylor	461	36.8	−16.9
IOA	Nasreen Majeed	445	35.5	New
Green	Stephen Hurt	158	12.6	−5.2
Conservative	Eric Sukumaran	98	7.8	−9.1
Liberal Democrats	Hana Packford	62	4.9	−6.7
TUSC	Agnieszka Kowalska	30	2.4	New
Majority		16	1.3	−34.7
Turnout		1,259	31.3	+1.5
Labour hold		Swing		

Marston By-Election 18 July 2024
Party	Candidate	Votes	%	±%
Green	Kate Robinson	640	34.5	−3.5
IOA	Nasreen Majeed	596	32.1	New
Labour	Charlotte Vinnicombe	495	26.7	–18.0
Conservative	Duncan Hatfield	70	3.8	–11.0
Liberal Democrats	Kathy Norman	55	3.0	–0.6
Majority		44	2.4	
Turnout		1,856	39.4	−3.5
Green hold		Swing		

=== 2021-2024 ===
Littlemore By-Election 2 March 2023
Party	Candidate	Votes	%	±%
Labour	Sandy Douglas	607	44.9	+0.6
Independent	Michael Evans	507	37.5	+2.9
Conservative	Timothy Patmore	135	10.0	−1.5
Green	David Thomas	65	4.8	−1.7
Liberal Democrats	Theo Jupp	26	1.9	−1.5
TUSC	Rachel Cox	12	0.9	+0.9
Majority		594	36.0	
Turnout		1,363	33	
Labour hold		Swing		

Hinksey Park By-Election 29 September 2022
Party	Candidate	Votes	%	±%
Labour	Anna Railton	801	51.3	−10.6
Green	Alex Powell	305	19.5	−0.9
Independent	Deborah Glass Woodin	270	17.3	+17.3
Liberal Democrats	Rick Tanner	118	7.6	−4.1
Conservative	Jennifer Saunders	60	3.8	−2.2
TUSC	Callum Joyce	8	0.5	+0.5
Majority		594	36.0	
Turnout		1562	36	
Labour hold		Swing		

=== 2016-2021 ===
Wolvercote By-Election 6 December 2018
Party	Candidate	Votes	%	±%
Liberal Democrats	Liz Wade	998	60.5	−0.5
Conservative	Jenny Jackson	404	24.5	+1.0
Labour	Ibrahim el-Hendi	162	9.8	−0.1
Green	Sarah Edwards	86	5.2	−0.5
Majority		594	36.0	
Turnout		1,650		
Liberal Democrats hold		Swing		

Headington By-Election 19 July 2018
Party	Candidate	Votes	%	±%
Liberal Democrats	Stef Garden	949	60.9	−0.4
Labour	Simon Ottino	419	26.9	−0.2
Conservative	Georgina Gibbs	124	8.0	+1.7
Green	Ray Hitchins	67	4.3	−1.1
Majority		530	34.0	
Turnout		1,559		
Liberal Democrats hold		Swing		

Barton and Sandhills By-Election 4 May 2017
Party	Candidate	Votes	%	±%
Labour	Mark Ladbrooke	698	47.1	−2.6
Conservative	Peter Saville	284	19.2	+6.9
Independent	Chaka Artwell	203	13.7	−3.0
Liberal Democrats	Steve Wheeler	194	13.1	+4.4
Green	Symon Hill	103	7.0	+1.2
Majority		414	27.9	
Turnout		1,482		
Labour hold		Swing		

=== 2012-2016 ===
Northfield Brook By-Election 22 October 2015
Party	Candidate	Votes	%	±%
Labour	Jennifer Pegg	509	77.9	+6.3
UKIP	Joe Lawes	60	9.2	+9.2
Conservative	Gary Dixon	47	7.2	−4.3
Green	Lucy Ayrton	28	4.3	−7.0
TUSC	James Morbin	9	1.4	+1.4
Majority		449	68.8	
Turnout		653		
Labour hold		Swing		

Northfield Brook By-Election 27 November 2014
Party	Candidate	Votes	%	±%
Labour	Sian Taylor	401	70.6	−1.0
Conservative	Gary Dixon	65	11.4	−0.1
Green	Ann Duncan	50	8.8	−2.5
TUSC	James Morbin	34	6.0	+6.0
Liberal Democrats	Michael Tait	18	3.2	−2.4
Majority		336	59.2	
Turnout		568		
Labour hold		Swing		

Blackbird Leys By-Election 27 November 2014
Party	Candidate	Votes	%	±%
Labour	Linda Smith	509	75.7	+8.4
UKIP	Dave Slater	91	13.5	−7.0
Conservative	Berk Bektas	27	4.0	−1.7
Green	Elizabeth McHale	21	3.1	−1.4
TUSC	Stella Collier	13	1.9	+1.9
Liberal Democrats	Lesley Mallinder	11	1.6	−0.4
Majority		418	62.2	
Turnout		672		
Labour hold		Swing		

Quarry & Risinghurst By-Election 18 September 2014
Party	Candidate	Votes	%	±%
Labour	Chewe Munkonge	782	42.3	−1.3
Liberal Democrats	Roz Smith	615	33.2	+7.8
Conservative	Katharine Harborne	222	12.0	−7.2
Green	Liz Taylor	186	10.0	−1.7
English Democrat	Julia Gasper	43	2.3	+2.3
Majority		167	9.1	
Turnout		1848	38	
Labour hold		Swing		

Carfax By-Election 4 September 2014
Party	Candidate	Votes	%	±%
Labour	Alex Hollingsworth	168	44.2	+11.9
Liberal Democrats	Tony Brett	101	26.6	+3.3
Green	Richard Scrase	63	16.6	−9.8
Conservative	Maryam Ahmed	24	6.3	−11.6
UKIP	Kenrick Bird	24	6.3	+6.3
Majority		67	17.6	
Turnout		380	8.6	
Labour hold		Swing		

Cowley By-Election 17 July 2014
Party	Candidate	Votes	%	±%
Labour	David Henwood	512	39.4	−11.9
Green	Hazel Dawe	269	20.7	−2.1
Independent	Artwell	257	19.8	+19.8
Conservative	Katharine Harborne	152	11.7	−4.5
UKIP	Ian Macdonald	72	5.5	+5.5
Liberal Democrats	Prakash Sharma	39	3.0	−13.2
Majority		243	18.7	
Turnout		1301	28	
Labour hold		Swing		

North By-Election 19 September 2013
Party	Candidate	Votes	%	±%
Labour	Louise Upton	367	34.7	+18.0
Liberal Democrats	Tim Bearder	330	31.2	−13.4
Green	Sushila Dhall	262	24.7	+10.6
Conservative	John Walsh	100	9.4	−15.1
Majority		37	3.5	
Turnout		1059	23	
Labour gain from Liberal Democrats		Swing		

=== 2008-2012 ===
Headington Hill and Northway By-Election 26 March 2009
Party	Candidate	Votes	%	±%
Labour	Roy Darke	548	38.3	+2.0
Conservative	Marc Borja	443	31.0	−2.6
Liberal Democrats	Ruth Beer	378	26.4	+2.4
Green	Katherine Wedell	62	4.3	−1.8
Majority		105	7.3	
Turnout		1431	32.9	+1.7
Labour hold		Swing		

Holywell By-Election 12 June 2008
Party	Candidate	Votes	%	±%
Liberal Democrats	Mark Mills	188	40.4	−5.0
Conservative	Paul Sargent	112	24.1	+1.6
Labour	Sarah Hutchinson	93	20.0	+6.4
Green	Chip Sherwood	72	15.5	−3.0
Majority		76	16.3	
Turnout		465	11.7	−15.2
Liberal Democrats hold		Swing		

=== 2004-2008 ===
Lye Valley By-Election 21 September 2006
Party	Candidate	Votes	%	±%
Labour	Bob Timbs	784	52.8	+8.4
Liberal Democrats	Nathan Pyle	487	32.8	−10.2
Conservative	Judith Harley	150	10.1	+10.1
Green	Larry Sanders	64	4.3	−8.4
Majority		297	20.0	
Turnout		1,485	31.0	
Labour hold		Swing		

Hinksey Park By-Election 27 July 2006
Party	Candidate	Votes	%	±%
Labour	Oscar Van Nooijen	676	45.6	−3.2
Green	Lilian Sherwood	436	29.4	−0.6
Liberal Democrats	Nathan Pyle	217	14.6	+5.7
Conservative	Caroline Ten Holter	155	10.4	−1.8
Majority		240	16.2	
Turnout		1,484	33.5	
Labour hold		Swing		

Jericho & Osney By-Election 8 December 2005
Party	Candidate	Votes	%	±%
Labour	Colin Cook	713	44.0	+10.7
Liberal Democrats	John Ballance	437	27.0	−12.1
Green	Athene Reiss	355	21.9	+6.6
Conservative	Patricia Jones	115	7.1	−5.2
Majority		276	17.0	
Turnout		1,620	33.1	
Labour gain from Liberal Democrats		Swing		

Northfield Brook By-Election 21 July 2005
Party	Candidate	Votes	%	±%
Labour	Carole Roberts	592	54.7	+8.2
Ind. Working Class	Delvise Saunders	300	27.7	−12.8
Liberal Democrats	Rosemary Morlin	141	13.0	+5.0
Conservative	Patricia Jones	31	2.9	−2.9
Green	Susan Tibbles	19	1.7	−3.3
Majority		451	27.0	
Turnout		1,083	26.1	
Labour hold		Swing		

Blackbird Leys By-Election 5 May 2005
Party	Candidate	Votes	%	±%
Labour	Rae Humberstone	969	50.0	
Ind. Working Class	Kelly Webster	566	29.2	
Conservative	Stuart Hand	176	9.1	
Liberal Democrats	Nathan Pyle	172	8.9	
Green	Susan Tibbles	54	2.8	
Majority		403	20.8	
Turnout		1,937	48.6	
Labour hold		Swing		

Carfax By-Election 21 October 2004
Party	Candidate	Votes	%	±%
Green	Sushila Dhall	203	33.3	−3.6
Liberal Democrats	Pamela Bones	175	28.7	−2.5
Labour	Bill Turner	161	26.4	+7.9
Conservative	Michael Davis	71	11.6	−1.8
Majority		28	4.6	
Turnout		610	14.9	
Green hold		Swing		

=== 2000-2004 ===
Blackbird Leys By-Election 11 October 2001
Party	Candidate	Votes	%	±%
Labour	Molly Florey	634	69.4	+8.0
Liberal Democrats	Bernard Gowers	138	15.1	+5.1
Conservative	David Brown	103	11.3	−7.2
Green	Patricia Dickson	38	4.2	−5.8
Majority		496	54.3	
Turnout		913	11.3	
Labour hold		Swing		

Central By-Election 7 June 2001
Party	Candidate	Votes	%	±%
Liberal Democrats	Antony Brett	1,165	33.4	
Green	Paul Williams	995	28.5	
Conservative	Richard Sage	692	19.8	
Labour	Joel Brookfield	635	18.2	
Majority		170	4.9	
Turnout		3,487		
Liberal Democrats gain from Green		Swing		

=== 1996-2000 ===
Old Marston and Risinghurst By-Election 9 September 1999
Party	Candidate	Votes	%	±%
Liberal Democrats		719	43.7	−7.1
Labour		506	30.7	+2.8
Conservative		352	21.4	+3.8
Green		69	4.2	+0.5
Majority		213	13.0	
Turnout		1,646	33.0	
Liberal Democrats hold		Swing		

West By-Election 4 September 1997
Party	Candidate	Votes	%	±%
Labour		512	32.7	−12.8
Liberal Democrats		511	32.6	+14.3
Green		405	25.8	+3.7
Conservative		139	8.9	−5.2
Majority		1	0.1	
Turnout		1,567	26.8	
Labour hold		Swing		

Quarry By-Election 4 September 1997
Party	Candidate	Votes	%	±%
Liberal Democrats		780	50.2	+21.7
Labour		462	29.7	−8.4
Conservative		259	16.7	−10.0
Green		54	3.5	−3.2
Majority		318	20.5	
Turnout		1,555	25.5	
Liberal Democrats gain from Labour		Swing		

Old Marston and Risinghurst By-Election 4 September 1997
Party	Candidate	Votes	%	±%
Liberal Democrats		478	41.9	+30.5
Labour		385	33.7	−24.6
Conservative		222	19.5	−4.8
Green		56	5.0	−1.1
Majority		93	8.2	
Turnout		1,141	23.0	
Liberal Democrats gain from Labour		Swing		

== See also ==
- Elections in the United Kingdom
