= 2010 Oxford City Council election =

2010 UK local government election

Results of the 2010 Oxford City Council election

Elections for Oxford City Council were held on Thursday 6 May 2010. As Oxford City Council is elected by halves, one seat in each of the 24 wards was up for election.

Labour gained two seats (Barton and Sandhills ward from the Liberal Democrats and Northfield Brook ward from the Independent Working Class Association), the Liberal Democrats also gained two seats (Carfax and St Clement's ward, both from the Green Party). As a result of this election, Labour gained control of the city council, with 25 out of 48 seats.

A general election was held on the same day, which accounts for the higher turnout (61.7%).

== Election results ==
Oxford local election result 2010
Party	Seats	Gains	Losses	Net gain/loss	Seats %	Votes %	Votes	+/−
Labour	13	2	0	+2	54.2	34.5	23,716	−0.1
Liberal Democrats	9	2	1	+1	37.5	30.6	21,038	+7.8
Green	2	0	2	−2	8.3	14.0	9,637	−2.9
Conservative	0	0	0	0	0	19.6	13,490	−0.6
UKIP	0	0	0	0	0	0.2	136	New
Independent	0	0	0	0	0	1.0	671	−0.6

Note: one Independent is standing in 2010, compared with three in 2008 and two in 2006. No candidates representing the Independent Working Class Association are standing in this election. No UKIP candidates were standing in 2008.

This result has the following consequences for the total number of seats on the Council after the elections:

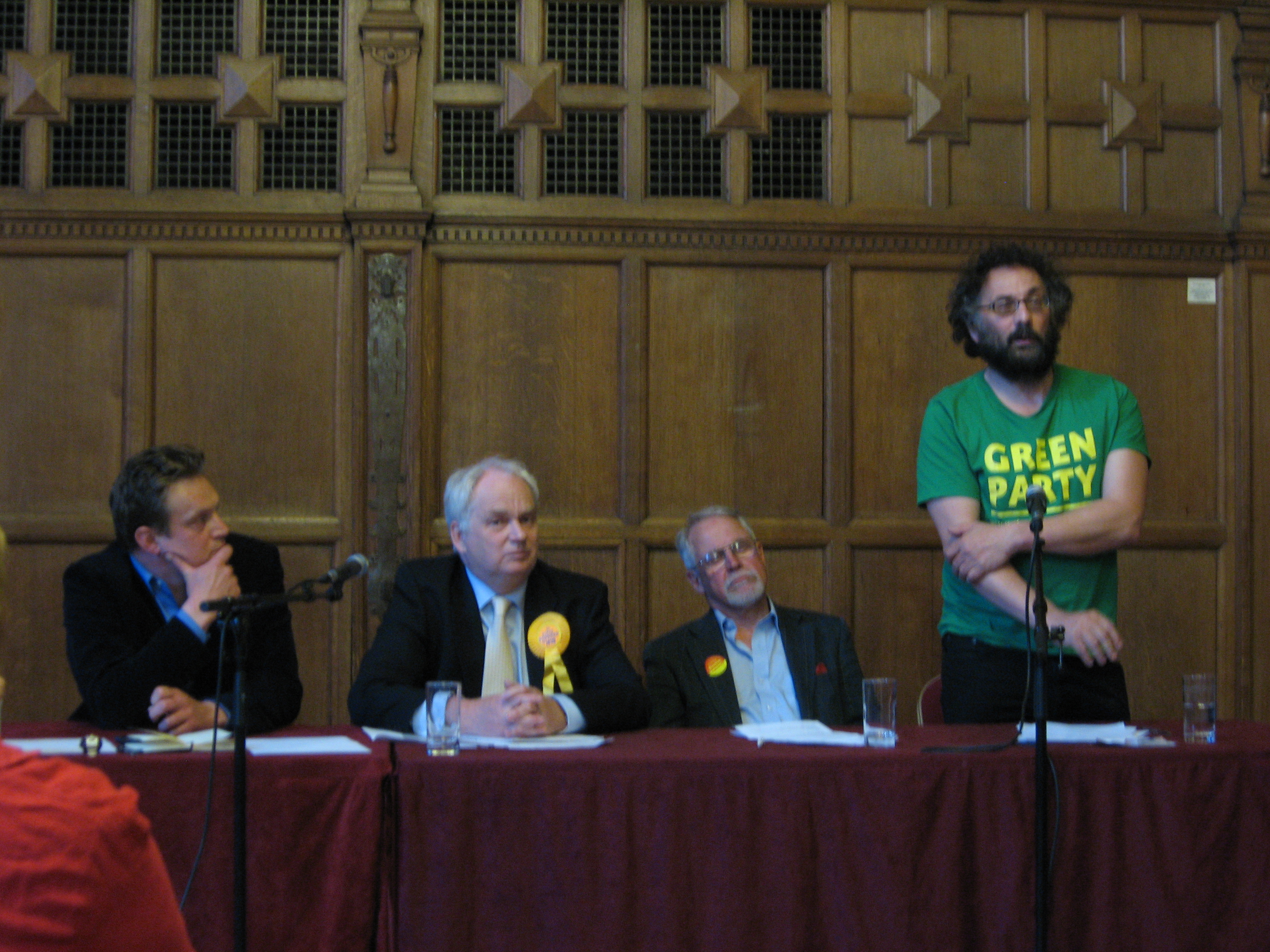
Political group leaders and senior politicians for the Oxford City Council (outgoing council at the election in 2010). From left to right: Jonathan Gittos candidate for the Conservatives, Councillor Stephen Brown leader of the political group of Liberal Democrats, Councillor John Tanner senior member of the Labour group, Councillor Craig Simmons leader of the Green group.

Party	Previous council	Staying councillors	Seats up for election	Election result	New council
Labour	23	12	11	13	25
Liberal Democrats	16	8	8	9	17
Green	7	3	4	2	5
Independent Working Class	2	1	1	0	1
Conservatives	0	0	0	0	0
UKIP	0	0	0	0	0
Independent	0	0	0	0	0
Total	48	24	24	24	48

== Results by ward ==
Map of the Oxford wards

Note: Gains and holds of wards are noted with respect to the 2006 council election (or a by-election of the same seat). Percentage changes are given with respect to the 2008 council election (or the latest by-election).

Turnout figures are the sum of the votes for each candidate only and do not yet include rejected ballots. These numbers will be included in the sum when available.

=== Barton and Sandhills ===
Party	Candidate	Votes	%	±%
Labour	Van Coulter	1,239	42.7	+8.7
Liberal Democrats	Barry Crossman	815	28.1	−6.2
Conservative	Timothy Hamer	661	22.8	−3.6
Green	Raymond Hitchins	188	6.5	+1.2
Turnout		2,903		
Labour gain from Liberal Democrats		Swing		

=== Blackbird Leys ===
Party	Candidate	Votes	%	±%
Labour	Rae Humberstone	1,510	69.5	+15.2
Conservative	Elizabeth Mills	299	13.8	+7.2
Liberal Democrats	Mark Wheeler	270	12.4	+10.7
Green	Jackie Chandler-Oatts	93	4.3	+1.9
Turnout		2,172		
Labour hold		Swing		

=== Carfax ===
Party	Candidate	Votes	%	±%
Liberal Democrats	Tony Brett	985	37.6	+1.9
Green	Vincent Larochelle	565	21.6	+1.8
Labour	Joe Ottaway	535	20.4	+3.1
Conservative	Patricia Jones	535	20.4	−6.7
Turnout		2,620		
Liberal Democrats gain from Green		Swing		

=== Churchill ===
Party	Candidate	Votes	%	±%
Labour	Joe McManners	1,168	47.6	+5.9
Liberal Democrats	Peter Bonney	629	25.6	+9.5
Conservative	Jonathan Asbridge	469	19.1	+6.9
Green	Julian Faultless	187	7.6	+4.3
Turnout		2,453		
Labour hold		Swing		

=== Cowley ===
Party	Candidate	Votes	%	±%
Labour	Shah Khan	1,264	45.9	−2.3
Liberal Democrats	Qasim Aziz	601	21.8	+6.2
Conservative	Judith Harley	506	18.4	+1.0
Green	Clare Valerie	385	14.0	+1.5
Turnout		2,756		
Labour hold		Swing		

Note that Shah Khan won the Cowley seat in the 2006 elections for the Liberal Democrats, but crossed the floor to Labour in 2007. So when comparing to the 2006 elections, Labour gain from Liberal Democrats.

=== Cowley Marsh ===
Party	Candidate	Votes	%	±%
Labour	Mohammed Abbasi	1,124	39.8	−11.6
Conservative	Clara Bantry White	816	28.9	+20.2
Liberal Democrats	Shah Nawaz	467	16.5	−13.2
Green	John Kentish	415	14.7	+4.5
Turnout		2,822		
Labour hold		Swing		

=== Headington ===
Party	Candidate	Votes	%	±%
Liberal Democrats	David Rundle	1,297	44.6	+9.2
Labour	Jane Darke	761	26.2	+9.5
Conservative	Paul Hernandez	572	19.7	−14.7
Green	Jill Haas	275	9.5	−4.0
Turnout		2,905		
Liberal Democrats hold		Swing		

=== Headington Hill and Northway ===
Party	Candidate	Votes	%	±%
Liberal Democrats	Mohammed Altaf-Khan	1,054	41.7	+15.3
Labour	Jamila Azad	733	29.0	−9.3
Conservative	Siddo Deva	521	20.6	−10.4
Green	Chris Brewer	218	8.6	+4.3
Turnout		2,526		
Liberal Democrats hold		Swing		

Note: ±% figures are calculated with respect to the results of the by-election of 26 March 2009.

=== Hinksey Park ===
Party	Candidate	Votes	%	±%
Labour	Bob Price	1,530	48.9	−3.3
Liberal Democrats	John Pinfold	681	21.8	+10.7
Conservative	Simon Mort	501	16.0	+2.7
Green	Chip Sherwood	417	13.3	−10.1
Turnout		3,129		
Labour hold		Swing		

=== Holywell ===
Party	Candidate	Votes	%	±%
Liberal Democrats	Mark Mills	1,073	38.9	−1.5
Green	Sophie Lewis	621	22.5	+7.0
Conservative	Frances Kennett	583	21.2	−2.9
Labour	Alistair Strathern	478	17.4	−2.6
Turnout		2,755		
Liberal Democrats hold		Swing		

Note: ±% figures are calculated with respect to the results of the by-election of 12 June 2008.

=== Iffley Fields ===
Party	Candidate	Votes	%	±%
Green	David Williams	1,094	37.2	−21.4
Labour	Mike Rowley	889	30.3	−0.2
Liberal Democrats	Doug Hale	667	22.7	N/A
Conservative	Carolyn Holder	288	9.8	−1.1
Turnout		2,938		
Green hold		Swing		

=== Jericho and Osney ===
Party	Candidate	Votes	%	±%
Labour	Susanna Pressel	1,793	53.0	−0.2
Liberal Democrats	Catherine Hilliard	769	22.7	+5.1
Conservative	Bill Wilson	513	15.2	+2.5
Green	Kaihsu Tai	311	9.2	−7.3
Turnout		3,386		
Labour hold		Swing		

=== Littlemore ===
Party	Candidate	Votes	%	±%
Labour	Gill Sanders	1,299	47.8	−2.9
Liberal Democrats	Dorian Hancock	641	23.6	+12.8
Conservative	Yvonne Lowe	585	21.5	−3.3
Green	Jenny Nicholson	191	7.0	−6.7
Turnout		2,716		
Labour hold		Swing		

=== Lye Valley ===
Party	Candidate	Votes	%	±%
Labour	Ben Lloyd-Shogbesan	1,320	44.9	−15.1
Liberal Democrats	Faisal Aziz	697	23.7	+14.8
Conservative	Allen Mills	647	22.0	+1.1
Green	Anna Pickering	275	9.4	−0.8
Turnout		2,939		
Labour hold		Swing		

=== Marston ===
Party	Candidate	Votes	%	±%
Labour	Mary Clarkson	1,292	38.9	+4.4
Independent	Mick Haines	671	20.2	−0.4
Liberal Democrats	Farida Anwar	622	18.7	−6.9
Conservative	Duncan Hatfield	468	14.1	−0.1
Green	Alistair Morris	272	8.2	+3.1
Turnout		3,325		
Labour hold		Swing		

=== North ===
Party	Candidate	Votes	%	±%
Liberal Democrats	Alan Armitage	1,303	44.6	+7.4
Conservative	Mark Hanson	715	24.5	−5.8
Labour	Michael Boyd	489	16.7	+1.9
Green	Peter Furtado	413	14.1	−3.6
Turnout		2,920		
Liberal Democrats hold		Swing		

=== Northfield Brook ===
Party	Candidate	Votes	%	±%
Labour	Scott Seamons	1,264		
Liberal Democrats	Rosemary Morlin	503		
Conservative	Robin Lomax	419		
Green	Alyson Duckmanton	140		
Turnout		2,326		
Labour gain from Ind. Working Class		Swing		

=== Quarry and Risinghurst ===
Party	Candidate	Votes	%	±%
Labour	Dee Sinclair	1,276		
Liberal Democrats	Gavin Baylis	938		
Conservative	Tia Macgregor	733		
Green	Sue Tibbles	207		
UKIP	Julia Gasper	136		
Turnout		3,290		
Labour hold		Swing		

=== Rose Hill and Iffley ===
Party	Candidate	Votes	%	±%
Labour	Antonia Bance	1,356	50.3	
Liberal Democrats	John Wilde	619	23.0	
Conservative	Moznu Miah	438	16.2	
Green	Rachel Bottley	284	10.5	
Turnout		2,697		
Labour hold		Swing		

=== St. Clement's ===
Party	Candidate	Votes	%	±%
Liberal Democrats	Graham Jones	898		
Green	Mary-Jane Sareva	884		
Labour	Sabir Mirza	762		
Conservative	Neil Prestidge	500		
Turnout		3,044		
Liberal Democrats gain from Green		Swing		

=== St. Margaret's ===
Party	Candidate	Votes	%	±%
Liberal Democrats	Jim Campbell	1,390	49.0	+15.6
Conservative	Vernon Porter	727	25.6	−1.3
Green	Hafiz Ladell	384	13.5	−14.3
Labour	James Fry	335	11.8	−0.2
Turnout		2,836		
Liberal Democrats hold		Swing		

=== St. Mary's ===
Party	Candidate	Votes	%	±%
Green	Dick Wolff	824		
Liberal Democrats	Peter Sloman	745		
Labour	Pat Kennedy	631		
Conservative	George Saliagopoulos	342		
Turnout		2,542		
Green hold		Swing		

=== Summertown ===
Party	Candidate	Votes	%	±%
Liberal Democrats	Jean Fooks	1,613		
Conservative	Laura Goodchild	904		
Green	Ann Duncan	498		
Labour	Tom Watts	321		
Turnout		3,336		
Liberal Democrats hold		Swing		

=== Wolvercote ===
Party	Candidate	Votes	%	±%
Liberal Democrats	John Goddard	1,412	42.0	
Conservative	Jonathan Gittos	1,149	34.3	
Green	Oliver Tickell	444	13.3	
Labour	Michael Taylor	347	10.4	
Turnout		3,352		
Liberal Democrats hold		Swing		

== Party share of vote map ==
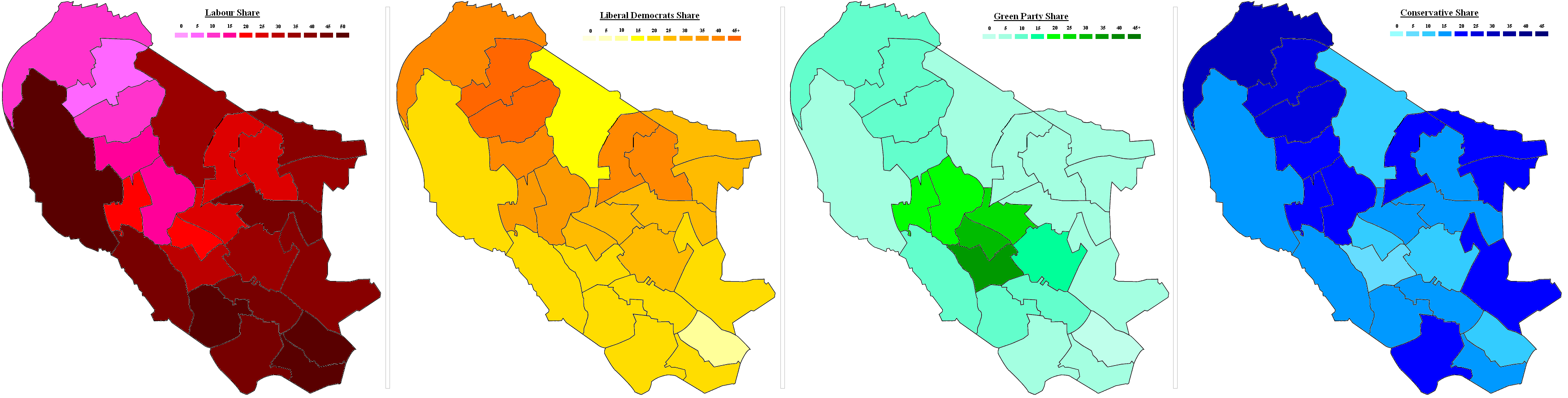
