= 2002 Oxford City Council election =

2002 UK local government election

Results of the 2002 Oxford City Council election

Elections to Oxford City Council were held on 2 May 2002. The whole council was up for election with boundary changes since the last election in 2000 reducing the number of seats by three. The Labour Party gained control of the council. The number of Councillors for each party after the election were Labour 29, Liberal Democrat 15, Green 3 and Independent Working Class Association 1. Overall turnout was 34%.

== Election result ==
Oxford local election result 2002
| Party | Seats | Gains | Losses | Net gain/loss | Seats % | Votes % | Votes | +/− |
|---|---|---|---|---|---|---|---|---|
| Labour | 29 | | | +8 | 60.4 | 38.4 | 24,667 | +8.0% |
| Liberal Democrats | 15 | | | -6 | 31.3 | 26.1 | 16,768 | -4.3% |
| Green | 3 | | | -5 | 6.3 | 18.7 | 11,985 | +0.1% |
| Ind. Working Class | 1 | | | +1 | 2.1 | 1.4 | 879 | +1.4% |
| Conservative | 0 | | | -1 | 0 | 14.6 | 9,359 | -4.9% |
| Socialist Alliance | 0 | | | 0 | 0 | 0.60 | 382 | +0.60% |
| Independent | 0 | | | 0 | 0 | 0.22 | 138 | -0.18% |

== Ward results ==
Barton and Sandhills (2 seats)
| Party | Candidate | Votes | % | ±% |
|---|---|---|---|---|
| Labour | Alexander Hollingsworth | 580 | | |
| Labour | Michael McAndrews | 564 | | |
| Conservative | Prudence Dailey | 270 | | |
| Liberal Democrats | Jeremy Wynne | 162 | | |
| Liberal Democrats | Jane Wyatt | 150 | | |
| Green | Raymond Hitchins | 97 | | |
| Green | Pallas Reiss | 54 | | |
| Turnout | | 1,877 | 25.2 | |

Blackbird Leys (2 seats)
| Party | Candidate | Votes | % | ±% |
|---|---|---|---|---|
| Labour | Valerie Smith | 633 | | |
| Labour | Patrick Stannard | 438 | | |
| Ind. Working Class | Daphne Kingston | 197 | | |
| Conservative | David Brown | 111 | | |
| Liberal Democrats | Mark Hinnells | 34 | | |
| Socialist Alliance | John Lister | 33 | | |
| Green | Patrick Lingwood | 22 | | |
| Liberal Democrats | Alexander MacFie | 19 | | |
| Green | Nuala Young | 18 | | |
| Turnout | | 1,505 | 22.6 | |

Carfax (2 seats)
| Party | Candidate | Votes | % | ±% |
|---|---|---|---|---|
| Green | Michael Woodin | 420 | | |
| Liberal Democrats | Paul Sargent | 355 | | |
| Liberal Democrats | Afia Ali | 341 | | |
| Green | Linda Losito | 290 | | |
| Labour | Timothy Waters | 211 | | |
| Labour | Karim Palant | 208 | | |
| Conservative | Ann Dykes | 153 | | |
| Conservative | Stephan Pritchard | 144 | | |
| Turnout | | 2,122 | 26.0 | |

Churchill (2 seats)
| Party | Candidate | Votes | % | ±% |
|---|---|---|---|---|
| Labour | Susan Brown | 589 | | |
| Labour | Peter Johnson | 564 | | |
| Conservative | Harry Brack | 205 | | |
| Liberal Democrats | Alan Edwards | 186 | | |
| Liberal Democrats | Rosemary Smith | 154 | | |
| Green | Alexis Kennedy | 81 | | |
| Green | Daniel Rosenberg | 71 | | |
| Socialist Alliance | George Roe | 64 | | |
| Turnout | | 1,914 | 25.1 | |

Cowley (2 seats)
| Party | Candidate | Votes | % | ±% |
|---|---|---|---|---|
| Labour | Beryl Keen | 693 | | |
| Labour | Bryan Keen | 668 | | |
| Liberal Democrats | Charles Hammond | 392 | | |
| Liberal Democrats | Nadeem Khan | 360 | | |
| Conservative | Ellen Smith | 210 | | |
| Green | Martin Juckes | 157 | | |
| Green | Jennifer Linsdell | 146 | | |
| Turnout | | 2,626 | 35.3 | |

Cowley Marsh (2 seats)
| Party | Candidate | Votes | % | ±% |
|---|---|---|---|---|
| Liberal Democrats | Ruth Beer | 501 | | |
| Labour | David Taylor | 486 | | |
| Labour | Mumtaz Fareed | 469 | | |
| Liberal Democrats | Sajjad-Hussain Malik | 459 | | |
| Green | James Kemp | 148 | | |
| Green | Ian Wanless | 130 | | |
| Conservative | Elizabeth Wells | 129 | | |
| Turnout | | 2,322 | 32.5 | |

Headington (2 seats)
| Party | Candidate | Votes | % | ±% |
|---|---|---|---|---|
| Liberal Democrats | David Rundle | 637 | | |
| Liberal Democrats | Stephen Tall | 597 | | |
| Conservative | Richard Jeffery | 459 | | |
| Conservative | Joseph Hannigan | 427 | | |
| Labour | Kathrin Luddecke | 312 | | |
| Labour | Terence Johnson | 306 | | |
| Green | Dave Dalton | 150 | | |
| Green | Xanthe Bevis | 112 | | |
| Socialist Alliance | Tracy Ellicott | 64 | | |
| Turnout | | 3,064 | 37.8 | |

Headington Hill and Northway (2 seats)
| Party | Candidate | Votes | % | ±% |
|---|---|---|---|---|
| Labour | Maureen Christian | 552 | | |
| Labour | Manawar Jan-Khan | 487 | | |
| Conservative | Philip McKearney | 342 | | |
| Conservative | Peter Salcombe | 341 | | |
| Liberal Democrats | Nigel Hall | 210 | | |
| Liberal Democrats | Mark Whittaker | 199 | | |
| Green | Katherine Wedell | 86 | | |
| Green | Tim Pizey | 57 | | |
| Turnout | | 2,274 | 32.3 | |

Hinksey Park (2 seats)
| Party | Candidate | Votes | % | ±% |
|---|---|---|---|---|
| Labour | Robert Price | 961 | | |
| Labour | Richard Muir | 836 | | |
| Green | Deborah Glass | 649 | | |
| Green | Donald O'Neal | 434 | | |
| Conservative | Simon Mort | 226 | | |
| Liberal Democrats | Christopher Bones | 139 | | |
| Liberal Democrats | Ruth Penwarden | 125 | | |
| Turnout | | 3,370 | 43.0 | |

Holywell (2 seats)
| Party | Candidate | Votes | % | ±% |
|---|---|---|---|---|
| Liberal Democrats | Antony Brett | 464 | | |
| Liberal Democrats | Fiyaz Mughal | 426 | | |
| Green | Paul Williams | 418 | | |
| Green | Laura Merrill | 416 | | |
| Conservative | Sean Sullivan | 190 | | |
| Conservative | Edmund Sutton | 185 | | |
| Labour | Siobhan McAndrew | 143 | | |
| Labour | Eleanor Reeves | 125 | | |
| Turnout | | 2,367 | 30.1 | |

Iffley Fields (2 seats)
| Party | Candidate | Votes | % | ±% |
|---|---|---|---|---|
| Labour | William Baker | 876 | | |
| Labour | Richard Tarver | 791 | | |
| Green | Elise Benjamin | 654 | | |
| Green | Larry Sanders | 559 | | |
| Liberal Democrats | Victoria Marsom | 124 | | |
| Conservative | Edward Parkin | 118 | | |
| Conservative | Margaret Croft | 109 | | |
| Liberal Democrats | Madeline Rowe | 102 | | |
| Turnout | | 3,333 | 41.5 | |

Jericho and Osney (2 seats)
| Party | Candidate | Votes | % | ±% |
|---|---|---|---|---|
| Labour | Susanna Pressel | 1,092 | | |
| Labour | Colin Cook | 895 | | |
| Green | Sushila Dhall | 325 | | |
| Liberal Democrats | Catherine Hilliard | 320 | | |
| Green | Lilia Patterson | 223 | | |
| Liberal Democrats | Michael Smithson | 219 | | |
| Conservative | Patricia Jones | 166 | | |
| Conservative | William Wilson | 154 | | |
| Turnout | | 3,394 | 39.5 | |

Littlemore (2 seats)
| Party | Candidate | Votes | % | ±% |
|---|---|---|---|---|
| Labour | Gillian Sanders | 724 | | |
| Labour | John Tanner | 697 | | |
| Conservative | David Leake | 393 | | |
| Conservative | John Young | 363 | | |
| Liberal Democrats | Vicky Potter | 140 | | |
| Green | Mark Stevenson | 118 | | |
| Green | Gail Percival | 90 | | |
| Liberal Democrats | Aidan Thomson | 70 | | |
| Turnout | | 2,595 | 32.1 | |

Lye Valley (2 seats)
| Party | Candidate | Votes | % | ±% |
|---|---|---|---|---|
| Labour | Sabir-Hussain Mirza | 627 | | |
| Labour | Daniel Paskins | 621 | | |
| Liberal Democrats | Robert Hoyle | 519 | | |
| Liberal Democrats | David Paintin | 462 | | |
| Green | Barbara Topley | 111 | | |
| Green | David Brooks-Saxl | 89 | | |
| Turnout | | 2,429 | 29.8 | |

Marston (2 seats)
| Party | Candidate | Votes | % | ±% |
|---|---|---|---|---|
| Labour | Mary Clarkson | 837 | | |
| Labour | Roy Darke | 765 | | |
| Conservative | Duncan Hatfield | 436 | | |
| Liberal Democrats | Anjana Tiwari | 400 | | |
| Conservative | Stuart Hand | 388 | | |
| Liberal Democrats | Kenji Tiwari | 378 | | |
| Green | Judith Chipchase | 167 | | |
| Green | Garry Budin | 141 | | |
| Turnout | | 3,512 | 41.0 | |

North (2 seats)
| Party | Candidate | Votes | % | ±% |
|---|---|---|---|---|
| Liberal Democrats | Jean Fooks | 602 | | |
| Liberal Democrats | Stephen Brown | 586 | | |
| Green | Adrian Arbib | 474 | | |
| Green | Miranda Carnegie | 422 | | |
| Labour | Suzanne Ledwith | 209 | | |
| Independent | John Rose | 138 | | |
| Labour | Andrew Small | 126 | | |
| Turnout | | 2,557 | 31.7 | |

Northfield Brook (2 seats)
| Party | Candidate | Votes | % | ±% |
|---|---|---|---|---|
| Labour | Molly Florey | 406 | | |
| Ind. Working Class | Stuart Craft | 354 | | |
| Ind. Working Class | Lee Cole | 328 | | |
| Labour | Jane Darke | 308 | | |
| Liberal Democrats | Bernard Gowers | 70 | | |
| Liberal Democrats | Choudhary Zafar | 59 | | |
| Green | Susan Tibbles | 44 | | |
| Green | Patricia Dickson | 38 | | |
| Turnout | | 1,607 | 22.4 | |

Quarry and Risinghurst (2 seats)
| Party | Candidate | Votes | % | ±% |
|---|---|---|---|---|
| Labour | Delia Sinclair | 607 | | |
| Liberal Democrats | Julian Allison | 552 | | |
| Labour | Noorjahan Sayani | 531 | | |
| Liberal Democrats | Jonathan Coats | 418 | | |
| Conservative | Peter Logan | 335 | | |
| Conservative | George Callaghan | 304 | | |
| Green | Sarah Wild | 106 | | |
| Green | Susan Miles | 72 | | |
| Socialist Alliance | Andrew Gibbons | 70 | | |
| Turnout | | 2,995 | 37.2 | |

Rose Hill and Iffley (2 seats)
| Party | Candidate | Votes | % | ±% |
|---|---|---|---|---|
| Labour | William Buckingham | 953 | | |
| Labour | Edward Turner | 791 | | |
| Liberal Democrats | David Penwarden | 534 | | |
| Liberal Democrats | Pamela Bones | 424 | | |
| Conservative | Gwendoline Fancutt | 149 | | |
| Conservative | Julian Hicks | 142 | | |
| Green | Oliver Tickell | 120 | | |
| Green | Simon Brook | 107 | | |
| Socialist Alliance | Ben Kenward | 60 | | |
| Turnout | | 3,280 | 41.8 | |

St Clement's (2 seats)
| Party | Candidate | Votes | % | ±% |
|---|---|---|---|---|
| Labour | Sophia Bartleet | 494 | | |
| Green | Claire Palmer | 489 | | |
| Green | Robert Sykes | 469 | | |
| Labour | John Courouble | 467 | | |
| Liberal Democrats | Owen Davies | 155 | | |
| Conservative | Jean Pocock | 146 | | |
| Conservative | Margaret Young | 138 | | |
| Liberal Democrats | Martin Stone | 132 | | |
| Turnout | | 2,490 | 28.6 | |

St Margaret's (2 seats)
| Party | Candidate | Votes | % | ±% |
|---|---|---|---|---|
| Liberal Democrats | James Campbell | 628 | | |
| Liberal Democrats | Corinna Redman | 628 | | |
| Green | Sally Bayley | 330 | | |
| Green | Mary Franklin | 324 | | |
| Conservative | Ursula Dreydel | 254 | | |
| Conservative | Robert Porter | 231 | | |
| Labour | Benjamin Harris | 127 | | |
| Labour | Tim Boyd | 115 | | |
| Turnout | | 2,637 | 36.5 | |

St Mary's (2 seats)
| Party | Candidate | Votes | % | ±% |
|---|---|---|---|---|
| Green | Craig Simmons | 433 | | |
| Labour | Mohammed Abbasi | 429 | | |
| Green | Annie Skinner | 390 | | |
| Labour | Peter Moss | 389 | | |
| Liberal Democrats | Elizabeth Barker | 150 | | |
| Conservative | Darren Green | 104 | | |
| Liberal Democrats | Pieter-Paul Barker | 96 | | |
| Socialist Alliance | Angelina Rai | 91 | | |
| Turnout | | 2,082 | 27.4 | |

Summertown (2 seats)
| Party | Candidate | Votes | % | ±% |
|---|---|---|---|---|
| Liberal Democrats | Alan Armitage | 811 | | |
| Liberal Democrats | Anthony Hollander | 788 | | |
| Conservative | Frank Bland | 453 | | |
| Green | Sheila Buck | 434 | | |
| Green | Malcolm Lee | 412 | | |
| Conservative | Jason Tomes | 390 | | |
| Labour | Joel Brookfield | 252 | | |
| Labour | Benjamin Seifert | 231 | | |
| Turnout | | 3,771 | 43.3 | |

Wolvercote (2 seats)
| Party | Candidate | Votes | % | ±% |
|---|---|---|---|---|
| Liberal Democrats | John Goddard | 801 | | |
| Liberal Democrats | Susan Roaf | 690 | | |
| Conservative | Graham Jones | 616 | | |
| Conservative | Raoul Cerratti | 578 | | |
| Green | Sheila Cameron | 444 | | |
| Green | Michael Hamblett | 444 | | |
| Labour | Patricia Brown | 244 | | |
| Labour | Michael Taylor | 238 | | |
| Turnout | | 4,055 | 48.0 | |

== See also ==
- 2002 United Kingdom local elections
- Elections in the United Kingdom
