= 2004 Oxford City Council election =

2004 UK local government election

Results of the 2004 Oxford City Council election

Elections to Oxford City Council were held on 10 June 2004. The council is elected by halves, so one seat in each ward was up for election (except in St Clements, where both seats were contested). Labour lost majority control of the council but remained in minority administration. Overall turnout was 37.6%, with the lowest turnout (26.5%) in Carfax ward and the highest (49.5%) in Wolvercote.

== Election result ==
Oxford local election result 2004
Party	Seats	Gains	Losses	Net gain/loss	Seats %	Votes %	Votes	+/−
Liberal Democrats	10	4	1	+3	40.0	30.2	12,053	+4.1%
Labour	7	0	9	-9	28.0	27.4	10,970	-11.0%
Green	5	4	0	+4	20.0	20.4	8,161	+1.7%
Ind. Working Class	3	2	0	+2	12.0	3.6	1,435	+2.2%
Conservative	0	0	0	0	0	17.6	7,019	+3.0%
Independent	0	0	0	0	0	0.83	333	+0.61%

Note: three Independents stood in 2004, compared with one in 2002.

The total number of seats on the Council after the election was:

- Labour - 20
- Liberal Democrats - 18
- Green - 7
- Independent Working Class Association - 3

Sources: BBC Oxford City Council

== Results by ward ==
Map of the Oxford Wards

All results from Oxford City Council.

=== Barton and Sandhills ===
Party	Candidate	Votes	%	±%
Liberal Democrats	Malcolm Murray	497	36.6%	
Labour	Peter Brennan	414	30.5%	
Conservative	Prudence Dailey	285	21.0%	
Green	Raymond Hitchins	149	10.9%	
Turnout		1,357	31.1	

=== Blackbird Leys ===
Party	Candidate	Votes	%	±%
Ind. Working Class	Lee Cole	494		
Labour	Patrick Stannard	415		
Liberal Democrats	Ian Bearder	92		
Conservative	Patricia Jones	91		
Green	Donald O'Neal	36		
Turnout		1,128	28.2	

=== Carfax ===
Party	Candidate	Votes	%	±%
Liberal Democrats	Paul Sargent	479		
Conservative	Edward Watkins	236		
Green	Pallas Reiss	185		
Labour	Peter Morton	185		
Turnout		1,091	26.5	

=== Churchill ===
Party	Candidate	Votes	%	±%
Ind. Working Class	Claire Kent	386		
Labour	Peter Johnson	376		
Conservative	John Young	256		
Liberal Democrats	Sybil Dibdin	202		
Green	Matthew Ledbury	94		
Turnout		1,318	28.9	

=== Cowley ===
Party	Candidate	Votes	%	±%
Labour	Beryl Keen	616		
Liberal Democrats	Shakil Khan	369		
Green	Martin Juckes	323		
Conservative	Georgina Shomroni	262		
Turnout		1,577	37.8	

=== Cowley Marsh ===
Party	Candidate	Votes	%	±%
Liberal Democrats	Sajjad-Hussain Malik	584		
Labour	Mumtaz Fareed	377		
Conservative	Judith Harley	222		
Green	David Bibby	179		
Independent	Khurshid Ahmed	74		
Turnout		1,445	36.7	

=== Headington ===
Party	Candidate	Votes	%	±%
Liberal Democrats	Stephen Tall	1,061		
Conservative	Tarrant Anderson	343		
Labour	Georgina Toynbee	193		
Green	Judith Chipchase	150		
Turnout		1,753	44.2	

=== Headington Hill and Northway ===
Party	Candidate	Votes	%	±%
Labour	Tony Gray	451		
Conservative	Michael Davis	434		
Liberal Democrats	Mohammed Altaf-Khan	287		
Green	Katherine Wedell	160		
Turnout		1,337	33.8	

=== Hinksey Park ===
Party	Candidate	Votes	%	±%
Labour	Richard Muir	869		
Green	Lilian Sherwood	534		
Liberal Democrats	Christopher Bones	282		
Conservative	Simon Mort	258		
Turnout		1,956	44.3	

=== Holywell ===
Party	Candidate	Votes	%	±%
Green	Matthew Sellwood	443		
Liberal Democrats	Michael Gotch	385		
Conservative	Gregory Stafford	225		
Labour	Timothy Waters	192		
Turnout		1,264	32.1	

=== Iffley Fields ===
Party	Candidate	Votes	%	±%
Green	Elise Benjamin	800		
Labour	Richard Tarver	721		
Liberal Democrats	Bernard Gowers	195		
Conservative	James Hayward-Bloomfield	160		
Turnout		1,946	45.9	

=== Jericho and Osney ===
Party	Candidate	Votes	%	±%
Liberal Democrats	Michael Collins	846		
Labour	Colin Cook	721		
Green	Lilia Patterson	332		
Conservative	William Wilson	266		
Turnout		2,175	46.1	

=== Littlemore ===
Party	Candidate	Votes	%	±%
Labour	John Tanner	539		
Conservative	Stuart Hand	359		
Green	Mark Stevenson	227		
Liberal Democrats	Nadeem Khan	198		
Turnout		1,334	30.0	

=== Lye Valley ===
Party	Candidate	Votes	%	±%
Labour	Daniel Paskins	597		
Liberal Democrats	Nathan Pyle	506		
Conservative	Marilyn Cox	271		
Green	Tim Pizey	141		
Turnout		1,524	32.9	

=== Marston ===
Party	Candidate	Votes	%	±%
Liberal Democrats	Caroline van Zyl	749		
Labour	Roy Darke	693		
Conservative	Duncan Hatfield	426		
Green	Jeremy Poster	157		
Turnout		2,030	46.3	

=== North ===
Party	Candidate	Votes	%	±%
Liberal Democrats	Clark Brundin	706		
Green	Sushila Dhall	500		
Conservative	Elizabeth Pryor	214		
Labour	William Turner	175		
Independent	John Rose*	62		
Turnout		1,669	39.0	

*John Rose stood on the platform "Local Government Reform"

=== Northfield Brook ===
Party	Candidate	Votes	%	±%
Ind. Working Class	Stuart Craft	555		
Labour	Rae Humberstone	439		
Conservative	Mohammed Abdul-Haq	90		
Liberal Democrats	Pamela Bones	89		
Green	Susan Tibbles	61		
Turnout		1,242	30.3	

=== Quarry and Risinghurst ===
Party	Candidate	Votes	%	±%
Liberal Democrats	Tia MacGregor	953		
Labour	Oscar van Nooijen	572		
Conservative	Elizabeth Mills	356		
Green	Matthew Ormondroyd	155		
Turnout		2,053	46.0	

=== Rose Hill and Iffley ===
Party	Candidate	Votes	%	±%
Labour	Edward Turner	676		
Liberal Democrats	David Penwarden	505		
Conservative	Allen Mills	256		
Green	Simon Brook	185		
Turnout		1,682	39.2	

=== St Clement's ===
Note: the top two candidates were elected
Party	Candidate	Votes	%	±%
Green	Claire Palmer	741		
Green	Mary-Jane Sareva	597		
Labour	Jane Darke	357		
Labour	Mohammed Nawaz	356		
Liberal Democrats	Ali Hydar	236		
Liberal Democrats	Andrew MacGregor	233		
Conservative	Peter Leeming	201		
Independent	David Leake	197		
Conservative	Gareth Jennings	197		
Turnout		1,564	33.9	

Because both seats were up for election each voter had two votes (i.e. plurality-at-large). Turnout has been estimated by halving the number of votes cast.

=== St Margaret's ===
Party	Candidate	Votes	%	±%
Liberal Democrats	Gwynneth Royce	635		
Green	Christopher Goodall	449		
Conservative	Robert Porter	358		
Labour	James Cloyne	108		
Turnout		1,559	38.7	

=== St Mary's ===
Party	Candidate	Votes	%	±%
Green	Sidney Phelps	616		
Labour	Mohammed Abbasi	496		
Liberal Democrats	Julia Goddard	198		
Conservative	Margaret Young	127		
Turnout		1,447	33.4	

=== Summertown ===
Party	Candidate	Votes	%	±%
Liberal Democrats	Anthony Hollander	938		
Green	Thomas Lines	462		
Conservative	Raoul Cerratti	457		
Labour	Oliver Kempton	216		
Turnout		2,082	44.6	

=== Wolvercote ===
Party	Candidate	Votes	%	±%
Liberal Democrats	Susan Roaf	828		
Conservative	Graham Jones	669		
Green	Sheila Cameron	485		
Labour	Michael Taylor	162		
Turnout		2,156	49.5	
