= 2006 Oxford City Council election =

2006 UK local government election

Results of the 2006 Oxford City Council election

Elections for Oxford City Council were held on Thursday 4 May 2006. As Oxford City Council is elected by halves, one seat in each of the 24 wards was up for election. The exception was St Clement's, where both seats were up for election as a by-election for the other seat was held on the same day. Therefore, 25 of the 48 seats on the council were up for election. Overall turnout was 35.8%, down from 37.6% in 2004. The lowest turnout (24.9%) was in Carfax ward and the highest (49.6%) in Marston.

== Results ==
Oxford local election result 2006
Party	Seats	Gains	Losses	Net gain/loss	Seats %	Votes %	Votes	+/−
Liberal Democrats	9	3	1	+2	36.0	31.4	12,081	+1.2
Labour	10	1	5	-4	40.0	30.1	11,581	+2.1
Green	5	1	0	+1	20.0	20.8	8,002	+0.4
Ind. Working Class	1	1	0	+1	4.0	4.0	1,538	+0.4
Conservative	0	0	0	0	0	12.0	4,626	-5.6
Independent	0	0	0	0	0	1.12	431	+0.29
Respect	0	0	0	0	0	0.55	213	+0.55

Note: two Independents stood in 2006, compared with three in 2004.

The total number of seats on the council after the election was:

- Liberal Democrats - 19 (39.6%)
- Labour - 17 (35.4%)
- Green - 8 (16.7%)
- Independent Working Class Association - 4 (8.3%)

== Nomination form controversy ==
The Oxford University Conservative Association president-elect Charlie Steel was the Conservative candidate in the Holywell ward. His candidacy was embroiled in controversy in late April when some of his nominators alleged that they had not signed his nomination forms, meaning their signatures had been forged. A Police investigation was launched and Steel did not resign from his OUCA position.

The full list of Steel's supposed nominators were a selection of students of the University of Oxford, some of whom were officers of the Oxford University Conservative Association (OUCA). A number of those officers subsequently complained to Oxford City Council that they had not signed the papers.

== Results by ward ==
Map of the Oxford Wards

=== Barton and Sandhills ===
Party	Candidate	Votes	%	±%
Liberal Democrats	Christopher Scanlan	657	39.8	+3.3
Labour	Michael McAndrews	570	34.6	+4.1
Conservative	Prudence Dailey	239	14.5	−6.5
Ind. Working Class	James Craft	102	6.2	+6.2
Green	Raymond Hitchins	81	4.9	−6.0
Turnout		1,656	35.4	+4.3

=== Blackbird Leys ===
Party	Candidate	Votes	%	±%
Labour	Rae Humberstone	579	48.4	−1.6
Ind. Working Class	Maurice Leen	519	43.4	+14.2
Liberal Democrats	Ian Bearder	69	5.8	−3.1
Green	Tim Pizey	29	2.4	−0.4
Turnout		1,204	29.7	+1.5

=== Carfax ===
Party	Candidate	Votes	%	±%
Green	Sushila Dhall	327	32.6	−0.7
Liberal Democrats	Gabriel Grant	304	30.3	+1.6
Conservative	Craig Aston	225	22.5	+10.9
Labour	Josephine Salmon	146	14.6	−11.8
Turnout		1,009	24.9	−1.6

=== Churchill ===
Party	Candidate	Votes	%	±%
Labour	Joseph McManners	597	46.4	
Ind. Working Class	David Kent	297	23.1	
Conservative	Richard Lang	158	12.3	
Liberal Democrats	Thomas Wilkinson	150	11.7	
Green	Oliver Tickell	85	6.6	
Turnout		1,296	28.2	−0.7

=== Cowley ===
Party	Candidate	Votes	%	±%
Liberal Democrats	Shah Khan	627	37.6	
Labour	Mumtaz Fareed	534	32.0	
Green	Martin Juckes	294	17.6	
Respect	Philippa Whittaker	213	12.8	
Turnout		1,680	39.1	+1.3

=== Cowley Marsh ===
Party	Candidate	Votes	%	±%
Labour	Mohammed Abbasi	513	37.8	
Liberal Democrats	Anthony Brett	404	29.8	
Green	Alyson Duckmanton	251	18.5	
Conservative	Judith Harley	188	13.9	
Turnout		1,365	33.1	−3.6

=== Headington ===
Party	Candidate	Votes	%	±%
Liberal Democrats	David Rundle	948	58.8	
Conservative	Duncan Hatfield	285	17.7	
Labour	Ruth Najeme	216	13.4	
Green	Matthew Ledbury	162	10.1	
Turnout		1,617	38.3	−5.9

=== Headington Hill and Northway ===
Party	Candidate	Votes	%	±%
Liberal Democrats	Mohammed Altaf-Khan	506	34.3	
Labour	Maureen Christian	451	30.6	
Conservative	Julian Wheatland	388	26.3	
Green	Katherine Wedell	130	8.8	
Turnout		1,483	35.2	+1.4

=== Hinksey Park ===
Party	Candidate	Votes	%	±%
Labour	Robert Price	882	48.8	
Green	Lilian Sherwood	543	30.0	
Conservative	Simon Mort	221	12.2	
Liberal Democrats	Martin Herben	161	8.9	
Turnout		1,817	41.0	−3.3

=== Holywell ===
Party	Candidate	Votes	%	±%
Liberal Democrats	Richard Huzzey	564	48.7	
Green	Matthew Morton	276	23.9	
Conservative	Charlie Steel	165	14.3	
Labour	Anneliese Dodds	152	13.1	
Turnout		1,179	29.2	−3.9

=== Iffley Fields ===
Party	Candidate	Votes	%	±%
Green	Arthur Williams	890	55.5	
Labour	Mohammed Nawaz	514	32.0	
Liberal Democrats	Bernard Gowers	200	12.5	
Turnout		1,617	40.1	−5.8

=== Jericho and Osney ===
Party	Candidate	Votes	%	±%
Labour	Susanna Pressel	1100	49.5	+5.5
Liberal Democrats	John Ballance	704	31.7	+4.4
Green	Sarah Pethybridge	265	11.9	−10.0
Conservative	Nicola Blackwood	154	6.9	−0.2
Turnout		2,235	45.3	−0.8

=== Littlemore ===
Party	Candidate	Votes	%	±%
Labour	Gillian Sanders	650	48.4	
Conservative	Michael Davis	319	23.7	
Liberal Democrats	John Wilde	201	15.0	
Green	Margaret Oakenby	174	12.9	
Turnout		1,357	30.7	+0.7

=== Lye Valley ===
Party	Candidate	Votes	%	±%
Labour	Sabir Mirza	659	44.4	
Liberal Democrats	Nathan Pyle	638	43.0	
Green	Susan Heeks	188	12.7	
Turnout		1,501	31.3	−1.6

=== Marston ===
Party	Candidate	Votes	%	±%
Labour	Mary Clarkson	944	43.3	
Liberal Democrats	Charles Haynes	717	32.9	
Independent	Michael Haines	398	18.2	
Green	Meena Dhanda	123	5.6	
Turnout		2,196	49.6	+3.3

=== North ===
Party	Candidate	Votes	%	±%
Liberal Democrats	Alan Armitage	663	49.0	
Green	Leopold Keyes	299	22.1	
Conservative	Robin Aitken	235	17.4	
Labour	Matthew Pennycook	157	11.6	
Turnout		1,360	32.8	−6.2

=== Northfield Brook ===
Party	Candidate	Votes	%	±%
Ind. Working Class	Jane Lacey	620	48.6	+20.9
Labour	Carole Roberts	502	39.4	−15.3
Liberal Democrats	Rosemary Morlin	91	7.1	−5.9
Green	Susan Tibbles	62	4.9	+3.2
Turnout		1,284	30.8	+0.5

=== Quarry and Risinghurst ===
Party	Candidate	Votes	%	±%
Labour	Delia Sinclair	789	39.2	
Liberal Democrats	Jonathan Coats	699	34.7	
Conservative	John Young	354	17.6	
Green	Judith Chipchase	173	8.6	
Turnout		2,027	44.9	−1.1

=== Rose Hill and Iffley ===
Party	Candidate	Votes	%	±%
Labour	Antonia Bance	727	48.5	
Liberal Democrats	Christopher Bones	343	22.9	
Conservative	Timothy Benjamin	230	15.3	
Green	Simon Brook	199	13.3	
Turnout		1,509	36.9	−2.3

=== St Clement's ===
Note: the top two candidates were elected; vote percentage and swing for parties, not candidates
Party	Candidate	Votes	%	±%
Green	Mary-Jane Sareva	645	Green	
Green	Nuala Young	574	48.1	
Liberal Democrats	Mark Whittaker	339	Lib Dem	
Liberal Democrats	Andrew MacGregor	310	25.6	
Labour	Kate Pounds	189	Lab	
Labour	Laurence Baxter	183	14.7	
Conservative	Stuart Hand	154	Con	
Conservative	Carolyn Holler	141	11.6	
Turnout		1,268	25.4	−8.5

Because both seats were up for election each voter had two votes (i.e. plurality-at-large voting). Turnout has been estimated by halving the number of votes cast.

=== St Margaret's ===
Party	Candidate	Votes	%	±%
Liberal Democrats	James Campbell	882	50.0	
Green	Christopher Goodall	491	27.8	
Conservative	Robert Porter	296	16.8	
Labour	Bruce Russell	95	5.4	
Turnout		1,769	42.9	+4.2

=== St Mary's ===
Party	Candidate	Votes	%	±%
Green	Craig Simmons	689	66.5	
Liberal Democrats	Michael Tait	173	16.7	
Labour	Daniel Simpson	141	13.6	
Independent	Pathmanathan Mylvaganam	33	3.2	
Turnout		1,056	25.3	−8.1

=== Summertown ===
Party	Candidate	Votes	%	±%
Liberal Democrats	Jean Fooks	820	42.3	
Green	Malcolm Lee	574	29.6	
Conservative	Raoul Cerratti	400	20.6	
Labour	Christopher Weaver	146	7.5	
Turnout		1,945	41.2	−3.4

=== Wolvercote ===
Party	Candidate	Votes	%	±%
Liberal Democrats	John Goddard	911	45.4	
Green	Sheila Cameron	478	23.8	
Conservative	Kenneth Bickers	474	23.6	
Labour	Michael Taylor	145	7.2	
Turnout		2,018	45.0	−4.5

== Party Share of Vote Maps ==
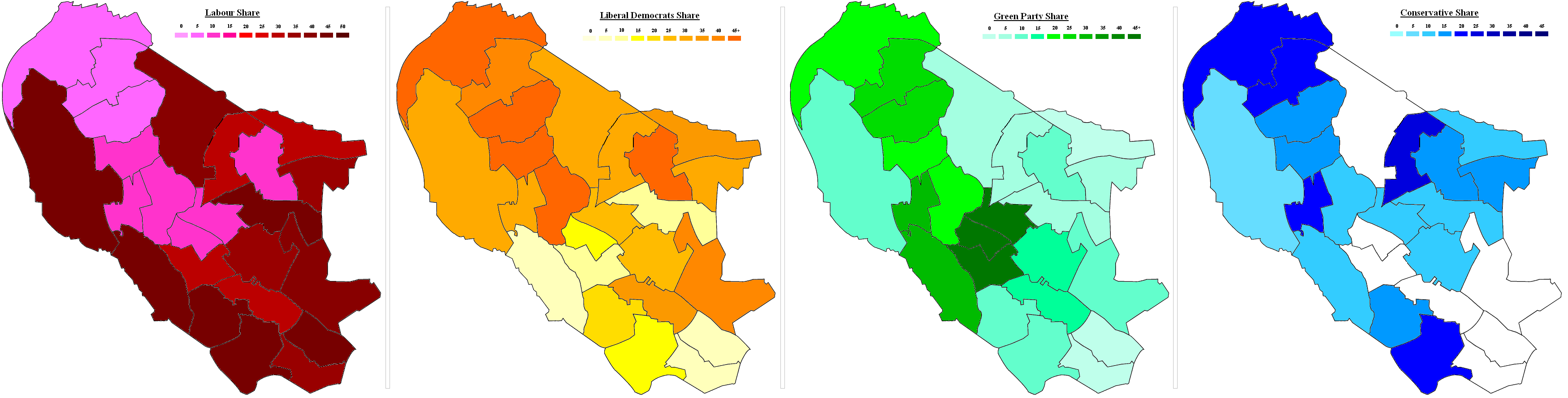
