= Robert Worcester =

American-born British pollster (1933–2025)

Sir Robert Worcester KBE DL
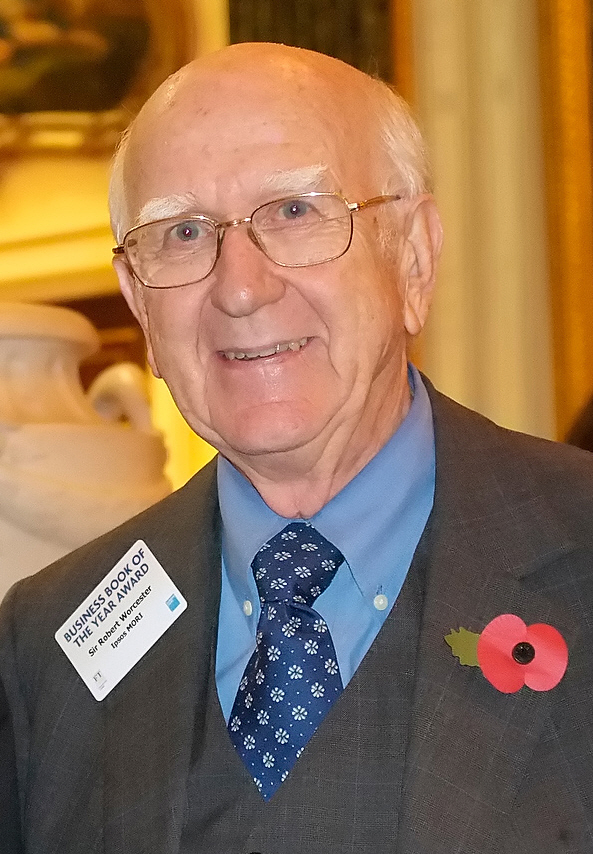
- Worcester in 2011

Chancellor of the University of Kent
- In office 2006–2014
- Preceded by: Sir Crispin Tickell
- Succeeded by: Gavin Esler

Personal details
- Born: 21 December 1933 Kansas City, Missouri, United States
- Died: 5 September 2025 (aged 91)
- Citizenship: United Kingdom; United States
- Education: University of Kansas
- Occupation: Pollster; Media commentator

Sir Robert Milton Worcester, KBE, DL (21 December 1933 – 5 September 2025) was an American-born British pollster who was the founder of MORI (Market & Opinion Research International Ltd.) and a member and contributor to many voluntary organisations. He was a well-known figure in British public opinion research and political circles and as a media commentator, especially about voting intentions in British and American elections.

== Early life ==
A Kansas City native, Worcester graduated from the University of Kansas in 1955, and following service in the US Army Corps of Engineers in Korea worked with management consultants McKinsey & Company.

== Career ==
In 1965, Worcester joined Opinion Research Corporation as chief financial officer before coming to Britain in 1969 to found MORI, then a joint-venture of ORC and National Opinion Polls, becoming the principal owner four years later.

In the 1970s MORI was appointed the Labour Party’s opinion pollsters and Worcester therefore acted as advisor to the then Prime Minister, James Callaghan.

He was appointed chancellor of the University of Kent in 2007 and retired from the role in 2014 and was succeeded by Gavin Esler. He was a governor of the London School of Economics and Political Science and visiting professor in the Government Department and also visiting professor in the Institute of Contemporary British History at King's College London. He was also honorary professor in the Department of Politics and International Studies at Warwick University. Earlier he was visiting professor in the Graduate Centre for Journalism at City University and in the Department of Marketing at Strathclyde University. He was the Chancellor's Lecturer and adjunct professor of political science at the University of Kansas. In 2005 he endowed a distinguished professorship in the Department of Political Science for his alma mater: the Sir Robert Worcester Distinguished Professor in Public Opinion and Survey Research.

Worcester was principal investigator for the World Values Survey in Trinidad and Tobago (2006, 2010) and United Kingdom (1998). For two years (1982–1984) he served as the president of the World Association for Public Opinion Research (WAPOR). He became a Patron of the UK Market Research Society in October 2012.

He was deputy chairman and trustee of the Magna Carta Trust and chaired the Magna Carta 2015 800th Anniversary Commemoration Committee, and was a governor of the Ditchley Foundation. He was also a member of the Fulbright Commission and a governor of the English-Speaking Union and co-chaired with Lord Watson the Jamestown 400th Commemoration British Committee (2005–07).

He was immediate past president and former chair of the advisory council of the Institute for Business Ethics and was on the Corporate Responsibility Advisory Board of Camelot. He was a member of the advisory council of the National Consumer Council and Forum for the Future.

He was a vice-president of the Royal Society of Wildlife Trusts, of the United Nations Association and of the European Atlantic Group and was president of ENCAMS (Keep Britain Tidy). He was a vice-president and was a trustee of Wildfowl & Wetlands Trust and was a World Wide Fund for Nature (WWF) trustee. He was a vice-president of Protect Kent, the Kent Branch of the Campaign to Protect Rural England. From 1993 to 2010, he was chairman of the Pilgrims Society.

Worcester was a Deputy Lieutenant of the County of Kent and a Kent County Council appointed Kent Ambassador. He was a non-executive director of Kent Messenger Group and chairman of Maidstone Radio, CTR 105.4 fm, and was a non-executive director of the Medway Maritime Hospital NHS Trust until 2004. Following the sale of MORI to the French research company Ipsos in October 2005, he became chairman of the Ipsos Public Affairs Research Advisory Board and an International Director of the Ipsos Group. Subsequently, in 2007 he became senior advisor to Ipsos MORI.

== Personal life and death ==
Worcester held joint American and British citizenship.

He and his wife, Margaret, lived at the 13th-century Allington Castle, on the River Medway in Kent. Lady Worcester died peacefully on 20 December 2020, aged 87.

Worcester died on 5 September 2025, at the age of 91.

== Awards and honours ==
Worcester was appointed Knight Commander of the Most Excellent Order of the British Empire (KBE) in 2005 in recognition of the "outstanding services rendered to political, social and economic research and for contribution to government policy and programmes".

He was an Honorary Fellow of the London School of Economics and Political Science and of King's College London, held six honorary doctorates, and the Distinguished Graduate award of the University of Kansas.

Academic offices
Preceded by Sir Crispin Tickell	Chancellor of the University of Kent; 2006–2014	Succeeded by Gavin Esler
