= Bart van Es =

British academic (born 1972)

Bart van Es (born 7 June 1972, Ede, Netherlands) is a literary critic and writer. He is a professor of English at the University of Oxford, where he is also a senior tutor at St Catherine's College.

Van Es was born in the Netherlands and lived in Norway, Dubai and Indonesia before his family settled in the United Kingdom in 1986. He attended a private boarding school before studying English at Fitzwilliam College, Cambridge, and gained his doctorate from Cambridge in 2000; his thesis title was "Forms of history in the works of Edmund Spenser".

His scholarly interests chiefly lie in the works of the English poet Edmund Spenser. He is the author of Spenser's Forms of History and editor of A Critical Companion to Spenser Studies. He has also published work on Shakespeare, including a recent investigation of Shakespeare's relationship with the players of the King's Men.

His 2018 book The Cut Out Girl: A Story of War and Family, Lost and Found, won the overall Costa Book of the Year award for 2018, after winning the Costa Biography of the Year award. The book tells the true story of Lien de Jong, who as a young Jewish girl was fostered by van Es's grandparents for safety in the occupied Netherlands in 1942. The judges described it as "sensational and gripping... shedding light on some of the most urgent issues of our time".

He stood for Labour in the 2022 Oxford City Council election. He was on the shortlist to be Labour candidate for Southampton Itchen at the 2024 United Kingdom general election.

In 2024, following the retirement of Kersti Börgars, Van Es became the temporary pro-Master of St. Catherine's College until a replacement master could be found.

== Selected publications ==
- Spenser's Forms of History (2002, Oxford UP ISBN 9780199249701 – based on his Cambridge doctoral thesis)
- A Critical Companion to Spenser Studies (edited, 2006, Palgrave Macmillan: ISBN 9781403920270)
- Shakespeare in Company (2013, Oxford UP, ISBN 9780199569311)
- Shakespeare’s Comedies: A Very Short Introduction (2016, Oxford UP: ISBN 9780198723356)
- The Cut Out Girl: A Story of War and Family, Lost and Found, (Penguin, 2018, ISBN 9780735222243)
