= 2008 Oxford City Council election =

2008 UK local government election

Results of the 2008 Oxford City Council election

Elections for Oxford City Council were held on Thursday 1 May 2008. As Oxford City Council is elected by halves, one seat in each of the 24 wards was up for election.

Overall turnout was 32.6%, down from 35.8% in 2006. The lowest turnout (20.8%) was in St Mary's ward and the highest (46.1%) in Marston.

== Results summary ==
Oxford local election result 2008
Party	Seats	Gains	Losses	Net gain/loss	Seats %	Votes %	Votes	+/−
Labour	12	4	0	+4	50.0	34.6	11,882	+4.5
Liberal Democrats	8	2	1	+1	33.3	22.8	7,857	−8.6
Green	3	0	1	−1	12.5	16.9	5,824	−3.9
Ind. Working Class	1	0	2	−2	4.2	3.9	1,329	−0.1
Conservative	0	0	2	−2	0.0	20.2	6,960	+8.2
Independent	0	0	0	0	0.0	1.6	537	+0.5

Note: three Independents stood in 2008, compared with two in 2006.

This result has the following consequences for the total number of seats on the Council after the elections:

Party	Previous council	Staying councillors	Seats up for election	Election result	New council
Labour	19	11	8	12	23
Liberal Democrats	15	8	7	8	16
Green	8	4	4	3	7
Independent Working Class	4	1	3	1	2
Conservatives	2	0	2	0	0
Independent	0	0	0	0	0
Total	48	24	24	24	48

== Results by ward ==
Map of the Oxford Wards

=== Barton and Sandhills ===
Party	Candidate	Votes	%	±%
Liberal Democrats	Patrick Murray	528	34.3	−5.5
Labour	Andrew Lomas	524	34.0	−0.6
Conservative	Timothy Hamer	406	26.4	+11.9
Green	Raymond Hitchins	82	5.3	+0.4
Turnout		1546	32.1	−3.3
Liberal Democrats hold		Swing		

=== Blackbird Leys ===
Party	Candidate	Votes	%	±%
Labour	Val Smith	647	54.3	+5.9
Ind. Working Class	Lee Cole	417	35.0	−8.4
Conservative	Gareth Jennings	79	6.6	+6.6
Green	Sue Tibbles	28	2.4	0.0
Liberal Democrats	Ian Bearder	20	1.7	−4.1
Turnout		1192	29.5	−0.2
Labour gain from Ind. Working Class		Swing		

=== Carfax ===
Party	Candidate	Votes	%	±%
Liberal Democrats	Stephen Brown	375	35.7	+5.4
Conservative	Paul Sargent	284	27.1	+4.6
Green	Claudia Fitzherbert	208	19.8	−12.8
Labour	Sarah Hutchinson	182	17.3	+2.7
Turnout		1059	24.5	−0.4
Liberal Democrats gain from Conservative		Swing		

Note that Paul Sargent won the Carfax seat in the 2004 elections for the Liberal Democrats, but crossed the floor to the Conservatives in 2007. So when comparing to the 2004 elections, the Liberal Democrats hold.

=== Churchill ===
Party	Candidate	Votes	%	±%
Labour	Mark Lygo	588	41.7	–4.7
Ind. Working Class	Claire Kent	375	26.6	+3.5
Liberal Democrats	Peter Bonney	227	16.1	+4.4
Conservative	Gordon Bell	172	12.2	–0.1
Green	Eliza Hilton	47	3.3	–3.3
Turnout		1412	30.9	+2.7
Labour gain from Ind. Working Class		Swing		

=== Cowley ===
Party	Candidate	Votes	%	±%
Labour	Bryan Keen	692	48.2	+16.2
Conservative	Judith Harley	250	17.4	+17.4
Liberal Democrats	Susan Gonzalez	224	15.6	−22.0
Green	Alyson Duckmanton	180	12.5	−5.1
Independent	Paul Garraway	91	6.3	N/A
Turnout		1440	32.9	−6.2
Labour hold		Swing		

=== Cowley Marsh ===
Party	Candidate	Votes	%	±%
Labour	Saj Malik	773	51.4	+13.6
Liberal Democrats	Tony Brett	447	29.7	−0.1
Green	Lilian Sherwood	153	10.2	−8.3
Conservative	Martin Young	131	8.7	−5.2
Turnout		1512	33.8	+5.6
Labour hold		Swing		

Note that Saj Malik won the Cowley Marsh seat in the 2004 elections for the Liberal Democrats, but crossed the floor to Labour in 2007. So when comparing to the 2004 elections, Labour gain from the Liberal Democrats.

=== Headington ===
Party	Candidate	Votes	%	±%
Liberal Democrats	Ruth Wilkinson	564	35.4	−23.4
Conservative	Chris Clifford	548	34.4	+16.7
Labour	Van Coulter	266	16.7	+3.3
Green	Jill Haas	215	13.5	+3.4
Turnout		1598	39.6	+1.3
Liberal Democrats hold		Swing		

=== Headington Hill and Northway ===
Party	Candidate	Votes	%	±%
Labour	Maureen Christian	485	36.3	+5.7
Conservative	Marc Borja	448	33.6	+7.3
Liberal Democrats	Jock Coats	320	24.0	−10.3
Green	Mary Livingstone	82	6.1	−2.7
Turnout		1340	31.2	−4.0
Labour hold		Swing		

=== Hinksey Park ===
Party	Candidate	Votes	%	±%
Labour	Oscar Van Nooijen	871	52.2	+6.6
Green	Deborah Glass Woodin	391	23.4	−6.0
Conservative	Simon Mort	222	13.3	+2.9
Liberal Democrats	Joe Chick	185	11.1	−3.5
Turnout		1666	36.0	−5.0
Labour hold		Swing		

Note: ±% figures are calculated with respect to the results of the by-election of 27 July 2006.

=== Holywell ===
Party	Candidate	Votes	%	±%
Liberal Democrats	Nathan Pyle	481	45.4	−3.3
Conservative	Alexander Stafford	239	22.5	+8.2
Green	Chip Sherwood	196	18.5	−5.4
Labour	Kieran Hutchinson Dean	144	13.6	+0.5
Turnout		1072	26.9	−2.3
Liberal Democrats gain from Green		Swing		

=== Iffley Fields ===
Party	Candidate	Votes	%	±%
Green	Elise Benjamin	858	54.7	
Labour	Mike Rowley	447	28.5	
Conservative	Nick Carter	159	10.1	
Turnout		1568	38.6	−1.5
Green hold		Swing		

=== Jericho and Osney ===
Party	Candidate	Votes	%	±%
Labour	Colin Cook	907	53.2	
Liberal Democrats	Adrian Rosser	301	17.6	
Conservative	Alexander Penny	216	12.7	
Turnout		1706		
Labour hold		Swing		

=== Littlemore ===
Party	Candidate	Votes	%	±%
Labour	John Tanner	639	50.7	
Conservative	Yvonne Lowe	313	24.8	
Green	Fionn Stevenson	173	13.7	
Liberal Democrats	Neil Fawcett	136	10.8	
Turnout		1261		
Labour hold		Swing		

=== Lye Valley ===
Party	Candidate	Votes	%	±%
Labour	Bob Timbs	741	60.0	+7.2
Conservative	John Lowe	258	20.9	+10.8
Green	John Kentish	126	10.2	+5.9
Liberal Democrats	Dave White	110	8.9	−23.9
Turnout		1235		
Labour hold		Swing		

Note: ±% figures are calculated with respect to the results of the by-election of 21 September 2006.

=== Marston ===
Party	Candidate	Votes	%	±%
Labour	Beverley Hazell	732	34.5	
Liberal Democrats	Caroline van Zyl	544	25.6	
Independent	Michael Haines	437	20.6	
Conservative	Duncan Hatfield	302	14.2	
Green	Alistair Morris	108	5.1	
Turnout		2123		
Labour gain from Liberal Democrats		Swing		

=== North ===
Party	Candidate	Votes	%	±%
Liberal Democrats	Clark Brundin	463	37.2	
Conservative	Frances Kennett	378	30.3	
Green	Merlyn Lyons	221	17.7	
Labour	Sue Ledwith	184	14.8	
Turnout		1246		
Liberal Democrats hold		Swing		

=== Northfield Brook ===
Party	Candidate	Votes	%	±%
Ind. Working Class	Stuart Craft	537	45.3	
Labour	Richard Stevens	471	39.7	
Conservative	Mary Jones	78	6.6	
Liberal Democrats	Beatrice Morlin	56	4.7	
Green	Kate Prendergast	44	3.7	
Turnout		1186		
Ind. Working Class hold		Swing		

=== Quarry and Risinghurst ===
Party	Candidate	Votes	%	±%
Labour	Laurence Baxter	786	37.6	
Conservative	Tia MacGregor	622	29.8	
Liberal Democrats	Roz Smith	585	28.0	
Green	Donald O'Neal	86	4.1	
Independent	Pat Mylvaganam	9	0.4	
Turnout		2088		
Labour gain from Conservative		Swing		

Note that Tia MacGregor won the Quarry and Risinghurst seat in the 2004 elections for the Liberal Democrats, but crossed the floor to the Conservatives in 2007. So when comparing to the 2004 elections, Labour gain from the Liberal Democrats.

=== Rose Hill and Iffley ===
Party	Candidate	Votes	%	±%
Labour	Edward Turner	751	54.8	
Conservative	Siddo Deva	230	16.8	
Liberal Democrats	Catherine Bearder	207	15.1	
Green	Larry Sanders	182	13.3	
Turnout		1370		
Labour hold		Swing		

=== St Clement's ===
Party	Candidate	Votes	%	±%
Green	Nuala Young	558	48.6	
Labour	Altaf Hussain	280	24.4	
Liberal Democrats	Matthew Dieppe	158	13.8	
Conservative	Elizabeth Mills	152	13.2	
Turnout		1148		
Green hold		Swing		

=== St Margaret's ===
Party	Candidate	Votes	%	±%
Liberal Democrats	Gwynneth Royce	469	33.4	−16.6
Green	Chris Goodall	390	27.8	0.0
Conservative	Vernon Porter	378	26.9	+10.1
Labour	James Fry	168	12.0	+6.6
Turnout		1407	32.6	−10.3
Liberal Democrats hold		Swing		

=== St Mary's ===
Party	Candidate	Votes	%	±%
Green	Matt Morton	488	57.1	
Labour	David Green	180	21.1	
Conservative	Carolyn Holder	99	11.6	
Liberal Democrats	Julia Goddard	87	10.2	
Turnout		854		
Green hold		Swing		

=== Summertown ===
Party	Candidate	Votes	%	±%
Liberal Democrats	Stuart McCready	747	44.2	+1.9
Conservative	Clara Bantry White	424	25.1	+4.5
Green	Sarah Pethybridge	349	20.7	−8.9
Labour	Scott Seamons	169	10.0	+2.5
Turnout		1699	35.5	−5.7
Liberal Democrats hold		Swing		

=== Wolvercote ===
Party	Candidate	Votes	%	±%
Liberal Democrats	Michael Gotch	623	34.1	−11.3
Conservative	Joanne Bowlt	572	31.3	+7.7
Green	Mary Franklin	377	20.6	−3.2
Labour	Michael Taylor	255	14	+6.8
Turnout		1831	40.3	−4.7
Liberal Democrats hold		Swing		

== Party share of vote map ==
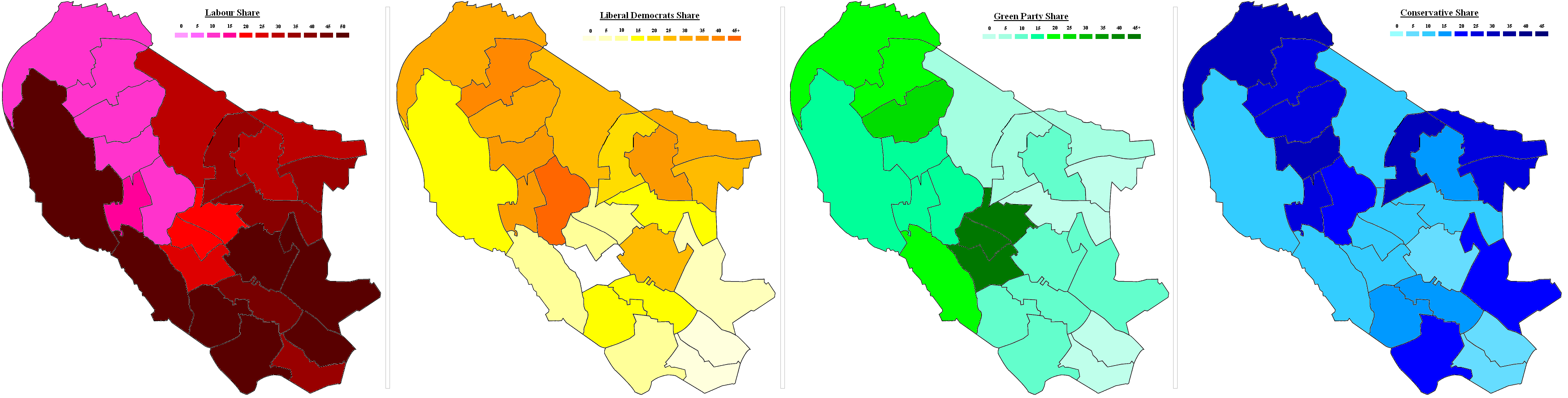

== Sources ==
- Election results, from Oxford City Council

== See also ==
- Elections in the United Kingdom
