= 2021 Oxford City Council election =

2021 UK local government election

- 6 May 2021

All 48 seats to Oxford City Council 25 seats needed for a majority
	First party	Second party	Third party
Party	Labour	Liberal Democrats	Green
Last election	18 seats, 47.8%	9 seats, 23.3%	1 seats, 14.5%
Seats before	36	9	2
Seats after	34	9	3
Seat change	▼2	Steady	▲1
Popular vote	32,654 (Note: Electors could vote for up to two candidates in this election)	13,340	15,337
Percentage	44.9%	18.4%	21.1%
Swing	▼2.9%	▼4.9%	▲6.6%
- Oxford City Council Election Results 2021, by first placed candidate.
Leader of the Council before election
Susan Brown
Labour
Elected Leader of the Council
Susan Brown
Labour

The 2021 Oxford City Council election took place on 6 May 2021, due to the postponement of local elections due to be held in 2020, and was to elect all 48 members of Oxford City Council. This was on the same day as the other local elections in England. Each of Oxford's 24 wards elect two councillors.

The Labour Party was again defending its majority on the council, which it had controlled since 2008.

== Background ==
Oxford City Council was subject to a boundary review following the 2018 election and thus all the seats were up for election. This was the first election held with new boundaries since 2002.

== Results summary ==
Oxford local election result 2021
Party	Seats	Gains	Losses	Net gain/loss	Seats %	Votes %	Votes	+/−
Labour	34			-2	70.83	44.91	32,654	
Liberal Democrats	9			0	18.75	18.35	13,340	
Green	3			+1	6.25	21.09	15,337	
Independent	2			+1	4.17	3.72	2,703	
Conservative	0	0	0	0	0.00	11.68	8,493	
TUSC	0	0	0	0	0.00	0.14	105	
For Britain	0	0	0	0	0.00	0.06	40	
Freedom Alliance	0	0	0	0	0.00	0.05	38	

== Ward results ==
Candidates are taken from the attached source.

Results are taken from the Oxford City Council website.

=== Barton and Sandhills ===
Party	Candidate	Votes	%	±%
Labour	Tanagra Jabu Nala-Hartley	586	45.7	
Labour	Mike Rowley	498	38.9	
Independent	Chaka Artwell	210	16.4	
Conservative	Chloe Dobbs	196	15.3	
Conservative	William Atkinson	181	14.1	
Green	Nicole Pohl	148	11.6	
Green	Stephen Hurt	132	10.3	
Liberal Democrats	Paul Rogers	131	10.2	
Liberal Democrats	Adrian Rosser	70	5.5	
Turnout		1,300	30.20	
Labour hold				
Labour hold				

=== Blackbird Leys ===
Party	Candidate	Votes	%	±%
Labour	Diko Blackings	345	38.4	
Labour	Rae Humberstone	337	37.5	
Conservative	Paul Sims	170	18.9	
Green	Barrie Finch	78	8.7	
Liberal Democrats	Freddie Hoareau	66	7.3	
TUSC	Agnieszka Kowalska	44	4.9	
Turnout		917	22.12	
Labour hold				
Labour hold				

=== Carfax and Jericho ===
Party	Candidate	Votes	%	±%
Labour Co-op	Lizzy Diggins	639	46.2	
Labour Co-op	Alex Hollingsworth	639	46.2	
Green	Sarah Edwards	317	22.9	
Green	Charlotte Schofield	302	21.8	
Liberal Democrats	Katherine Norman	246	17.8	
Liberal Democrats	Juhi Kore	208	15.0	
Conservative	Ben Hack	114	8.2	
Conservative	Frankie Wright	102	7.4	
TUSC	Adam Powell-Davies	22	1.6	
Turnout		1,398	37.69	
Labour win (new seat)				
Labour win (new seat)				

=== Churchill ===
Party	Candidate	Votes	%	±%
Labour	Mark Lygo	668	53.2	
Labour	Susan Brown	660	52.6	
Conservative	Sean Keeley	221	17.6	
Green	Steven Rogers	147	11.7	
Conservative	Adam Phelps	144	11.5	
Green	Henry Watts	132	10.5	
Liberal Democrats	Adam Povey	102	8.1	
Liberal Democrats	Maxwell Stewart	58	4.6	
Independent	Alex Evangelou-Shingler	37	2.9	
Turnout		1,264	26.48	
Labour hold				
Labour hold				

=== Cowley ===
Party	Candidate	Votes	%	±%
Labour	Paula Dunne	925	44.3	
Labour	Mohammed Latif	918	43.9	
Green	Hazel Dawe	573	27.4	
Green	Steven Dawe	367	17.6	
Independent	David Henwood	340	16.3	
Conservative	Duncan Hatfield	247	11.8	
Conservative	Simon Mort	213	10.2	
Liberal Democrats	Eleonore Vogel	101	4.8	
Liberal Democrats	Theodore Jupp	55	2.6	
Turnout		2,190	42.86	
Labour hold				
Labour hold				

=== Cutteslowe and Sunnymead ===
Party	Candidate	Votes	%	±%
Liberal Democrats	Andrew Gant	1,148	48.9	
Liberal Democrats	Laurence Fouweather	914	38.9	
Labour	Jane Stockton	507	21.6	
Labour	Paul Shuter	471	20.1	
Conservative	Juliette Ash	378	16.1	
Conservative	Jenny Jackson	345	14.7	
Green	John Fox	300	12.8	
Green	Marco Palumbo	241	10.3	
Turnout		2,357	48.70	
Liberal Democrats win (new seat)				
Liberal Democrats win (new seat)				

=== Donnington ===
Party	Candidate	Votes	%	±%
Green	Lucy Pegg	814	40.6	
Labour	Evin Abrishami	802	40.0	
Green	Rosie Rawle	742	37.0	
Labour	Richard Tarver	732	36.5	
Conservative	Lucinda Armstrong	127	6.3	
Conservative	Simon Bazley	125	6.2	
Liberal Democrats	Geraldine Coggins	72	3.6	
Liberal Democrats	Alexandrine Kantor	44	2.2	
Independent	Hakeem Yousaf	28	1.4	
Turnout		2,012	44.63	

=== Headington ===
Party	Candidate	Votes	%	±%
Liberal Democrats	Mohammed Altaf-Khan	1,057	47.6	
Liberal Democrats	Chris Smowton	853	38.4	
Labour Co-op	Delia Sinclair	664	29.9	
Labour Co-op	Liam Corbally	591	26.6	
Green	Ray Hitchins	237	10.7	
Green	Rowan Muson	231	10.4	
Conservative	Adam Wright	186	8.4	
Conservative	Rakiya Farah	183	8.2	
Turnout		2,232	45.77	

=== Headington Hill and Northway ===
Party	Candidate	Votes	%	±%
Labour	Nigel Chapman	684	46.5	
Labour	Barbara Coyne	618	42.0	
Conservative	Georgina Gibbs	276	18.8	
Conservative	Anthony Taylor	196	14.3	
Green	Kate Robinson	210	14.3	
Liberal Democrats	Pippa Hitchcock	201	13.7	
Liberal Democrats	Joanna Steele	187	12.7	
Green	Christopher Brewer	148	10.1	
Turnout		1,484	35.49	

=== Hinksey Park ===
Party	Candidate	Votes	%	±%
Labour	Marie Tidball	1,273	62.1	
Labour	Naomi Waite	986	48.1	
Independent	Deborah Glass Woodin	321	15.7	
Green	Suzanne Aspden	310	15.1	
Liberal Democrats	Rick Tanner	244	11.9	
Green	David Cunningham	195	9.5	
Liberal Democrats	Andy Wilkins	137	6.7	
Conservative	Polly Elliott Metcalfe	128	6.2	
Conservative	Marcus Walford	122	6.0	
Turnout		2,064	48.77	

=== Holywell ===
Party	Candidate	Votes	%	±%
Labour	Imogen Thomas	531	49.3	
Labour	Edward Mundy	447	41.5	
Green	Diane Regisford	344	31.9	
Green	Oscar Idle	322	29.9	
Liberal Democrats	Phillip Gentles	134	12.4	
Liberal Democrats	Rowan Waller	89	8.3	
Conservative	Adam James	81	7.5	
Conservative	Arash Fatemian	69	6.4	
Turnout		1,085	36.75	

=== Littlemore ===
Party	Candidate	Votes	%	±%
Labour	Nadine Bely-Summers	711	48.7	
Labour	Tiago Corais	686	47.0	
Conservative	Daniel Stafford	334	22.9	
Conservative	Derron Jarell	236	16.2	
Green	Kevin McGlynn	216	14.8	
Green	David Thomas	170	12.3	
Liberal Democrats	George Singleton	140	9.6	
Liberal Democrats	Jacques Reading	66	4.5	
Turnout		1,467	35.95	

=== Lye Valley ===
Party	Candidate	Votes	%	±%
Labour	Linda Smith	511	41.6	
Labour	Ajaz Rehman	468	38.1	
Conservative	Timothy Patmore	269	21.9	
Green	Matthew Elliot	235	19.1	
Green	Will O'Sullivan	173	14.1	
Liberal Democrats	Beverley Joshua	103	8.4	
Liberal Democrats	Anne Lloyd-Williams	92	7.5	
Turnout		1,249	29.95	

=== Marston ===
Party	Candidate	Votes	%	±%
Labour	Mary Clarkson	1,059	43.6	
Independent	Mick Haines	921	37.9	
Green	Alistair Morris	831	34.2	
Labour	Mohammed Khan	461	19.0	
Conservative	Mark Bhagwandin	411	16.9	
Green	Callum Morris	278	11.4	
Liberal Democrats	Maire Archer	123	5.1	
Liberal Democrats	Siddarth Deva	82	3.4	
Turnout		2,444	52.30	

=== Northfield Brook ===
Party	Candidate	Votes	%	±%
Labour	Duncan Hall	509	50.0	
Labour	Hosnieh Djafari-Marbini	426	41.8	
Conservative	Patricia Jones	163	16.0	
Green	David Newman	150	14.7	
Conservative	Fay Sims	143	14.0	
Liberal Democrats	Rosemary Morlin	87	8.5	
For Britain	Lorenzo de Gregori	40	3.9	
TUSC	James Morbin	39	3.8	
Turnout		1,034	23.52	

=== Osney and St. Thomas ===
Party	Candidate	Votes	%	±%
Labour	Susanna Pressel	1,070	57.2	
Labour	Colin Cook	799	42.8	
Green	Lois Muddiman	760	40.7	
Green	Peter Thompson	391	20.9	
Conservative	Louise Brown	150	8.0	
Conservative	Aurora Guerrini	128	6.8	
Independent	Antony Houghton (Note: The candidate's name was reported as "Anthony Houghton" by the Oxford Mail but appears as "HOUGHTON, Antony Scott" in the statement of persons nominated.)	60	3.2	
Turnout		1,882	44.36	

=== Quarry and Risinghurst ===
Party	Candidate	Votes	%	±%
Liberal Democrats	Roz Smith	1,049	41.1	
Labour	Chewe Munkonge	1,043	40.9	
Labour	Trish Elphinstone	925	36.2	
Liberal Democrats	Andrew Steele	520	20.4	
Green	Liz Taylor	278	10.9	
Conservative	Elina Horsfall-Turner	271	10.6	
Conservative	Neil Mukherjee	254	10.0	
Green	Jane Clark	180	7.1	
Turnout		2,553	49.98	

=== Rose Hill and Iffley ===
Party	Candidate	Votes	%	±%
Labour	Shaista Aziz	876	44.9	
Labour	Ed Turner	831	42.6	
Green	Nuala Young	467	23.9	
Green	Stephen Thomas	417	21.4	
Conservative	Craig Morley	213	10.9	
Conservative	Dara Sanwal	168	8.6	
Liberal Democrats	David Bowkett	131	6.7	
Liberal Democrats	Peter Coggins	124	6.4	
Freedom Alliance	John McCann	38	1.9	
Turnout		1,961	42.72	

=== St. Clement's ===
Party	Candidate	Votes	%	±%
Labour	Tom Hayes	944	60.3	
Labour	Jemima Hunt	686	43.8	
Green	Colin Aldridge	421	26.9	
Green	Kelsey Trevett	285	18.2	
Conservative	Jack Matthews	133	8.5	
Liberal Democrats	Graham Jones	121	7.7	
Liberal Democrats	Josie Procter	117	7.5	
Conservative	Katrina Watson	85	5.4	
Turnout		1,593	36.35	

=== St. Mary's ===
Party	Candidate	Votes	%	±%
Green	Chris Jarvis	1,135	54.6	
Green	Dick Wolff	1,056	50.8	
Labour	Luke Akehurst	644	31.0	
Labour	Jesse Erlam	612	29.9	
Liberal Democrats	Julia Goddard	96	4.6	
Liberal Democrats	Kai Pischke	68	3.3	
Conservative	David Coleman	68	3.3	
Conservative	Jenny Saunders	57	2.7	
Turnout		2,086	44.48	

=== Summertown ===
Party	Candidate	Votes	%	±%
Liberal Democrats	Tom Landell-Mills	807	41.3	
Liberal Democrats	Katherine Miles	715	36.6	
Labour	Christopher Hull	589	30.1	
Labour	Sam McKee	473	24.2	
Green	Christopher Goodall	319	16.3	
Conservative	Penelope Lenon	309	15.8	
Conservative	George Robinson	293	15.0	
Green	Joshua Deru	243	12.4	
Turnout		1,961	46.23	

=== Temple Cowley ===
Party	Candidate	Votes	%	±%
Labour	Lubna Arshad	770	45.0	
Independent	Saj Malik	578	33.4	
Labour	Simon Ottino	554	32.0	
Green	Richard Scrase	244	14.1	
Independent	Judith Harley	236	13.6	
Green	Natthew Ledbury	228	13.2	
Liberal Democrats	Tony Brett	117	6.8	
Conservative	Kyeswa Johnson	114	6.6	
Conservative	Simon Howell	108	6.2	
Liberal Democrats	Frank Hardee	66	3.8	
Turnout		1,742	38.26	

=== Walton Manor ===
Party	Candidate	Votes	%	±%
Labour	James Fry	1,068	61.4	
Labour	Louise Upton	859	49.4	
Liberal Democrats	Carole-Ann Turner	489	28.1	
Liberal Democrats	James Cox	408	23.5	
Conservative	Maddy Ross	148	8.5	
Conservative	David Pope	134	7.7	
Turnout		1,752	47.25	

=== Wolvercote ===
Party	Candidate	Votes	%	±%
Liberal Democrats	Steve Goddard	967	51.6	
Liberal Democrats	Liz Wade	735	39.2	
Green	Sheila Cameron	314	16.7	
Conservative	Gary Dixon	285	15.2	
Labour	Judith Williams	281	15.0	
Labour	Andrew Siantonas	277	14.8	
Green	Jane Wilkinson	247	13.2	
Conservative	Robin Morrisen	215	11.5	
Turnout		1,885	51.93	
