= Crispin Tickell =

British diplomat and environmentalist (1930–2022)

Sir Crispin Tickell GCMG KCVO FZS
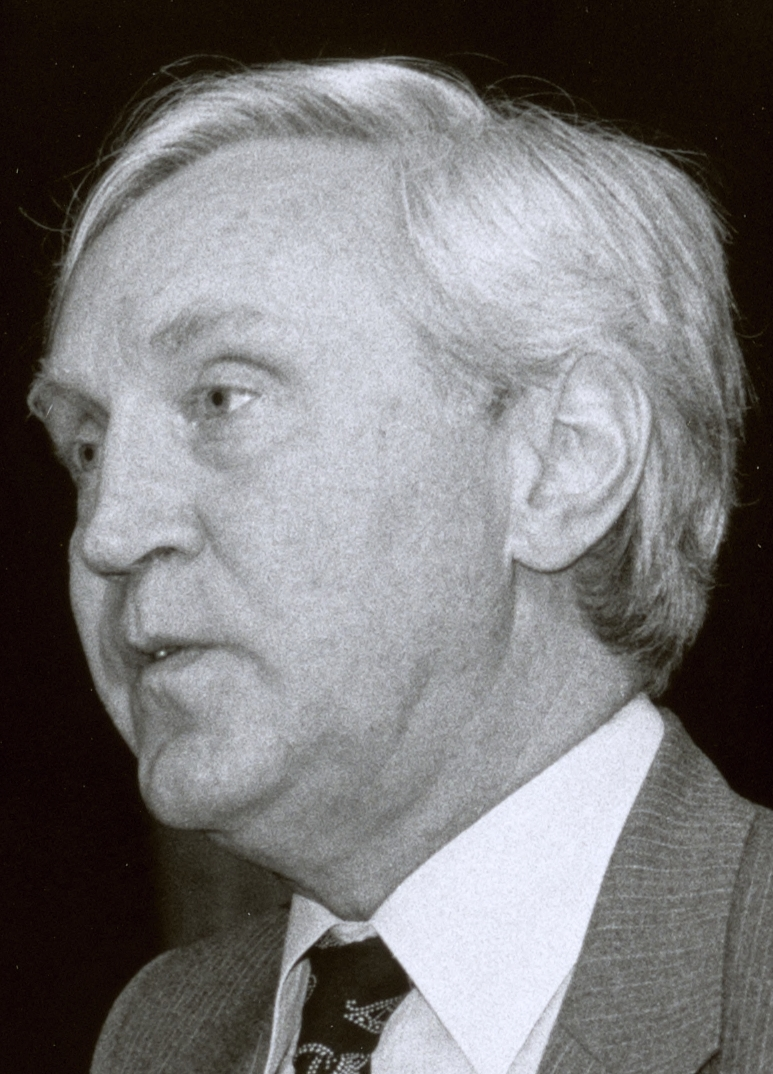
- Tickell in 1989

Permanent Representative of the United Kingdom to the United Nations
- In office 1987–1990
- Monarch: Elizabeth II
- Prime Minister: Margaret Thatcher
- Preceded by: John Adam Thomson
- Succeeded by: David Hannay

Her Majesty's Ambassador to Mexico
- In office 1981–1983
- Monarch: Elizabeth II
- Prime Minister: Margaret Thatcher
- Preceded by: Norman Ernest Cox
- Succeeded by: Sir Kenneth James

Personal details
- Born: Crispin Charles Cervantes Tickell; 25 August 1930 Notting Hill, London, England
- Died: 25 January 2022 (aged 91) Ablington, Gloucestershire, England
- Spouses: Chloe Gunn (m. 1954; div. 1976); Penelope Thorne (m. 1977)
- Children: 3, including Oliver Tickell
- Education: Christ Church, Oxford
- Awards: Knight Grand Cross of the Order of St Michael and St George; Knight Commander of the Royal Victorian Order; Fellow of the Zoological Society of London

Sir Crispin Charles Cervantes Tickell GCMG KCVO FZS (25 August 1930 – 25 January 2022) was a British diplomat, environmentalist and academic.

== Background ==
Tickell was born in Notting Hill, London on 25 August 1930, the son of writer Jerrard Tickell and Renée (née Haynes), a great-granddaughter of Thomas Henry Huxley. He was educated at Westminster School where he was a King's Scholar, and Christ Church, Oxford, graduating in 1952 with first class honours in Modern History. He did his national service in the Coldstream Guards as a 2nd Lieutenant from 1952 to 1954.

== Diplomatic career ==
Tickell joined the British diplomatic service in 1954, serving at the Foreign Office Main Building in London until 1955. He was responsible for looking after the British Antarctic Territory; the experience gained may have laid the foundations for long-term interests in the environment. He then had a posting at the British Embassy in The Hague (1955–58); Mexico City (1958–61); London (1961–64); Paris (1964–70); and Private Secretary to various Chancellors of the Duchy of Lancaster (1970–72) during negotiations for the UK entry into the European Community. He was later Chef de Cabinet to the President of the European Commission (1977–1980), British Ambassador to Mexico (1981–1983), Permanent Secretary of the Overseas Development Administration (now Department for International Development) (1984–1987), and British Ambassador to the United Nations and Permanent Representative on the UN Security Council (1987–1990).

He was appointed MVO in 1958 and later knighted as a KCVO in 1983 on the Royal Yacht Britannia, to mark the conclusion of Queen Elizabeth's Official Visit to Mexico. He was appointed GCMG for his work at the UN in 1988.

=== Spying at U.N. headquarters debate ===
When Clare Short, former international development secretary in Blair's Cabinet, said that British intelligence bugged the office of Kofi Annan, the UN Secretary-General, Tickell refused to comment on the accuracy of Short's claim, saying he had a continuing duty of loyalty to governments past and present and told the BBC, "What I would say is I would not be surprised if in New York there is a great deal of listening all over the place from one country to another, and I don't know whether it really makes very much difference. My conscience is quite clear about these matters and I would not think it necessarily a bad thing at all if it is in the national interest." Tickell added, "Our friends and allies may indeed be doing something like that themselves."

Tickell also criticized Short for resigning from her position of Secretary for International Development in protest of Tony Blair's entry into the Iraq War in May 2003 and reprimanded her: "your prime loyalty is to your employer and, indeed, to the interests of the country."

== Academic career ==
Tickell was President of the Royal Geographical Society from 1990 to 1993 and Warden of Green College, Oxford, between 1990 and 1997, where he appointed George Monbiot and Norman Myers as Visiting Fellows. Green College merged with Templeton College in 2008 to become Green Templeton College, located at what was previously Green College.

He was President of the Marine Biological Association from 1990 to 2001. From 1996 until August 2006 he was chancellor of the University of Kent when Sir Robert Worcester took over the position. He was director of the Policy Foresight Programme of the James Martin 21st Century School at the University of Oxford (formerly the Green College Centre for Environmental Policy and Understanding) and Chairman Emeritus of the Climate Institute, in Washington D.C. He has many interests, including climate change, population issues, conservation of biodiversity, and the early history of the Earth.

Margaret Thatcher credited Tickell with persuading her to make a speech on global climate change to the Royal Society in September 1988 (though the speech was written by Thatcher and George Guise).

He chaired John Major's Government Panel on Sustainable Development (1994–2000), and was a member of two government task forces under the Labour Party: one on urban regeneration, chaired by Sir Richard Rogers, later Lord Rogers (1998–99), and one on potentially hazardous near-Earth objects (2000).

He was an Honorary Fellow of St Edmund's College, Cambridge.

== Public impact ==
A man of strong environmental convictions, he was described as having been influential in Britain, although his environmental message did not always travel as easily abroad, particularly to the United States. His 1977 book Climatic Change and World Affairs argued that mandatory international pollution control would eventually be necessary. Despite his non-scientific background, he was internationally respected as having had a strong grasp of science policy issues. He was the recipient, between 1990 and 2006, of 23 honorary doctorates.

He was the president of the UK charity Tree Aid, which enables communities in Africa's drylands to fight poverty and become self-reliant, while improving the environment. He was also a patron of population concern charity Population Matters, (formerly known as the Optimum Population Trust), and told BBC Radio 4's Today programme that the ideal population for Britain could be around 20 million. As a member of Lord Rogers' Urban Task Force, Tickell counselled against spreading cities saying that we need denser living, that young adults should not expect to leave home straight away, and that older relatives could live in "granny flats".

== Personal life and death ==
Sir Crispin lived in a converted barn in the Cotswolds. He married Chloe Gunn in 1954 but the marriage was dissolved in 1976. He had two sons and one daughter from this marriage. The following year, he married Penelope Thorne. His main recreations included climatology, paleohistory, pre-Columbian art, and mountains. His son is Oliver Tickell, former editor of The Ecologist.

Tickell died from pneumonia and cancer at his home in Ablington, Gloucestershire, on 25 January 2022, aged 91.

== Former appointments ==
- Non-executive Director, IBM UK (1990–1995)
- Trustee, Natural History Museum (1992–2001)
- Trustee, Baring Foundation (1992–2002)

== Publications ==
- Climate Change and World Affairs, with a preface by Solly Zuckerman (1977, second edition 1986, Harvard International Affairs Committee). second edition available online in full
- Mary Anning of Lyme Regis, with a preface by John Fowles (1996, 1998 and 2003).

== Styles and honours ==
- Mr Crispin Tickell (1930–1958)
- Mr Crispin Tickell MVO (1958–1983)
- Sir Crispin Tickell KCVO (1983–1988)
- Sir Crispin Tickell GCMG KCVO (from 1988)

== Offices held ==
Diplomatic posts
| Preceded by Norman Ernest Cox | Ambassador to Mexico; 1981–1983 | Succeeded by Kenneth James |
| Preceded by John Adam Thomson | UK Permanent Representative to the United Nations; 1987–1990 | Succeeded by David Hannay |
Academic offices
| Preceded by Sir Robert Horton | Chancellor of the University of Kent; 1995–2006 | Succeeded by Sir Robert Worcester |
