= 2022 Oxford City Council election =

2022 UK local government election

- 5 May 2022

24 of 48 seats to Oxford City Council 25 seats needed for a majority
	First party	Second party	Third party
Party	Labour	Liberal Democrats	Green
Seats before	34 (17 up)	9 (4 up)	3 (1 up)
Seats won	15	4	4
Seats after	32	9	6
Seat change	▼2	Steady	▲3
Popular vote	17,615	6,780	7,319
Percentage	43.9%	16.9%	18.3%
	Fourth party
Party	Independent
Seats before	2 (2 up)
Seats won	1
Seats after	1
Seat change	▼1
Popular vote	4,932
Percentage	12.3%
- Map showing results of 2022 City Council election

The 2022 Oxford City Council election took place on 5 May 2022 as part of the 2022 local elections to elect councillors to Oxford City Council, the district council for the city of Oxford, England. Half of the 48 seats on the council were up for election, one councillor for each of the 24 wards.

== Background ==
Oxford City Council is a district council which elects 24 of its 48 members every two years. In the 2021 election, all 48 members were elected after boundary changes in the first full election to the council since 2002. Labour won an outright majority, with 34 seats.

The 2022 local elections are seen as a wider indication of public opinion on Boris Johnson's government and the Partygate scandal, as well as the leadership of Keir Starmer, the Labour leader, and Ed Davey, the leader of the Liberal Democrats.

== Results summary ==
2022 Oxford City Council election
Party	This election				Full council			This election		
Party	Candidates	Seats	Net	Seats %	Other	Total	Total %	Votes	Votes %	+/−
Labour	24	15	▼2	62.5	17	32	66.7	17,615	43.9	-1.0
Liberal Democrats	23	4	Steady	16.7	5	9	18.8	6,780	16.9	-1.5
Green	23	4	▲3	16.7	2	6	12.5	7,319	18.3	-2.8
Independent	10	1	▼1	4.2	0	1	2.1	4,932	12.3	+8.6
Conservative	21	0	Steady	0.0	0	0	0.0	3,197	8.0	-3.7
TUSC	7	0	Steady	0.0	0	0	0.0	254	0.6	+0.5

== Ward results ==
Results are taken from the Oxford City Council website.

=== Barton and Sandhills ===
Barton and Sandhills
Party	Candidate	Votes	%	±%
Labour	Mike Rowley *	603	52.8	13.9 ▲
Independent	Chaka Artwell	220	19.3	2.9 ▲
Conservative	Jack Matthews	178	15.6	0.3 ▲
Liberal Democrats	Paul Rogers	122	10.7	0.5 ▲
TUSC	Callum Joyce	19	1.7	New
Turnout		1142	26.76	
Labour hold				

=== Blackbird Leys ===
Blackbird Leys
Party	Candidate	Votes	%	±%
Labour	Rae Humberstone *	625	75.3	37.8 ▲
Green	Thomas Kiley	72	8.7	Steady
Liberal Democrats	Alexandrine Kantor	68	8.2	0.9 ▲
TUSC	Agnieszka Kowalska	65	7.8	2.9 ▲
Turnout		830	20.44	
Labour hold				

=== Carfax and Jericho ===
Carfax and Jericho
Party	Candidate	Votes	%	±%
Labour	Alex Hollingsworth *	802	56.2	10.0 ▲
Green	Sarah Edwards	363	25.4	3.5 ▲
Liberal Democrats	Kai Pischke	168	11.8	6.0 ▼
Conservative	David Pope	95	6.7	1.5 ▼
Turnout		1428	36.71	
Labour hold				

=== Churchill ===
Churchill
Party	Candidate	Votes	%	±%
Labour	Susan Brown *	664	57.9	5.3 ▲
Conservative	Jennifer Saunders	166	14.5	3.1 ▼
Green	Duncan Watts	153	13.3	1.6 ▲
Liberal Democrats	Pippa Hitchcock	97	8.5	0.4 ▲
TUSC	Carlin Kiggell	67	5.8	New
Turnout		1147	26.60	
Labour hold				

=== Cowley ===
Cowley
Party	Candidate	Votes	%	±%
Labour	Mohammed Latif *	978	48.0	4.1 ▲
Independent	David Henwood	686	33.7	17.4 ▲
Green	Steven Rogers	195	9.6	17.8 ▼
Conservative	Kate Kettle	124	6.1	5.7 ▼
Liberal Democrats	Andy Wilkins	53	2.6	2.2 ▼
Turnout		2036	42.79	
Labour hold				

=== Cutteslowe and Sunnymead ===
Cutteslowe and Sunnymead
Party	Candidate	Votes	%	±%
Liberal Democrats	Laurence Fouweather *	1,184	55.5	16.6 ▲
Labour	Bart van Es	476	22.3	0.7 ▲
Conservative	Jennifer Jackson	279	13.1	3.0 ▼
Green	John Fox	195	9.1	3.7 ▼
Turnout		2134	44.13	
Liberal Democrats hold				

=== Donnington ===
Donnington
Party	Candidate	Votes	%	±%
Green	Rosie Rawle	792	39.9	2.9 ▲
Labour	Roushin Bagdash	623	31.4	8.6 ▼
Independent	Mohammed Azad	459	23.1	New
Conservative	Simon Bazley	73	3.7	2.6 ▼
Liberal Democrats	Peter Coggins	38	1.9	1.7 ▼
Turnout		1985	46.55	
Green gain from Labour				

=== Headington ===
Headington
Party	Candidate	Votes	%	±%
Liberal Democrats	Chris Smowton *	1,057	48.0	9.6 ▲
Labour	Trish Elphinstone	818	37.2	7.3 ▲
Conservative	Paul Sims	157	7.1	1.3 ▼
Green	Ray Hitchens	141	6.4	4.3 ▼
TUSC	Adam Powell-Davies	28	1.3	New
Turnout		2201	46.35	
Liberal Democrats hold				

=== Headington Hill and Northway ===
Headington Hill and Northway
Party	Candidate	Votes	%	±%
Labour	Barbara Coyne *	750	48.7	6.7 ▲
Independent	Peter West	462	30.0	New
Green	Kate Robinson	141	9.1	5.2 ▼
Conservative	Georgina Gibbs	94	6.1	12.7 ▼
Liberal Democrats	Joanna Steele	94	6.1	6.6 ▼
Turnout		1541	38.98	
Labour hold				

=== Hinksey Park ===
Hinksey Park
Party	Candidate	Votes	%	±%
Labour	Naomi Waite *	1,118	61.9	13.8 ▲
Green	Janet Hall	369	20.4	5.3 ▲
Liberal Democrats	Rick Tanner	211	11.7	0.2 ▼
Conservative	Simon Howell	109	6.0	0.2 ▼
Turnout		1807	42.61	
Labour hold				

=== Holywell ===
Holywell
Party	Candidate	Votes	%	±%
Labour	Edward Mundy *	497	49.7	8.2 ▲
Green	Dianne Regisford	364	36.4	4.5 ▲
Liberal Democrats	Janey Little	140	14.0	1.6 ▲
Turnout		1001	32.78	
Labour hold				

=== Littlemore ===
Littlemore
Party	Candidate	Votes	%	±%
Labour	Tiago Corais *	718	44.3	2.7 ▼
Independent	Sadiea Mustafa-Awan	557	34.3	New
Conservative	Daniel Stafford	186	11.5	11.4 ▼
Green	David Thomas	106	6.5	8.3 ▼
Liberal Democrats	Julia Goddard	55	3.4	6.2 ▼
Turnout		1622	40.26	
Labour hold				

=== Lye Valley ===
Lye Valley
Party	Candidate	Votes	%	±%
Labour	Ajaz Rehman *	546	41.3	3.2 ▲
Independent	Judith Harley	462	35.0	New
Green	Stephen Hurt	134	10.1	9.0 ▼
Conservative	Tim Patmore	120	9.1	12.8 ▼
Liberal Democrats	Eleonore Vogel	59	4.5	3.9 ▼
Turnout		1321	32.37	
Labour hold				

=== Marston ===
Marston
Party	Candidate	Votes	%	±%
Green	Alistair Morris	1,085	47.0	12.8 ▲
Labour	Charlotte Vinnicombe	839	36.4	17.4 ▲
Conservative	Duncan Hatfield	309	13.4	3.5 ▼
Liberal Democrats	Adam Povey	74	3.2	1.9 ▼
Turnout		2307	51.62	
Green gain from Independent				

=== Northfield Brook ===
Northfield Brook
Party	Candidate	Votes	%	±%
Labour	Hosnieh Djafari Marbini *	591	66.6	24.8 ▲
Conservative	Fay Sims	124	14.0	2.0 ▼
Green	David Newman	74	8.3	6.4 ▼
Liberal Democrats	Rosemary Morlin	61	6.9	1.6 ▼
TUSC	James Morbin	38	4.3	0.5 ▲
Turnout		888	20.63	
Labour hold				

=== Osney and St Thomas ===
Osney and St Thomas
Party	Candidate	Votes	%	±%
Green	Lois Muddiman	907	47.7	7.0 ▲
Labour	Colin Cook *	885	46.5	3.7 ▲
Conservative	Kate Watson	111	5.8	2.2 ▼
Turnout		1903	44.64	
Green gain from Labour				

=== Quarry and Risinghurst ===
Quarry and Risinghurst
Party	Candidate	Votes	%	±%
Labour	Chewe Munkonge *	1,343	57.2	16.3 ▲
Liberal Democrats	Andrew Steele	584	24.9	4.5 ▲
Conservative	Mark Bhagwandin	231	9.8	0.8 ▼
Green	Madeline Linnell	188	8.0	2.9 ▼
Turnout		2346	46.87	
Labour hold				

=== Rose Hill and Iffley ===
Rose Hill and Iffley
Party	Candidate	Votes	%	±%
Labour	Edward Turner *	858	46.5	3.9 ▲
Independent	Michael Evans	516	28.0	New
Green	Alexander Powell	254	13.8	10.1 ▼
Conservative	Gary Dixon	118	6.4	4.5 ▼
Liberal Democrats	Catherine Bearder	86	4.7	2.0 ▼
TUSC	Albert Clifton	13	0.7	New
Turnout		1845	40.57	
Labour hold				

=== St. Clement's ===
St. Clement's
Party	Candidate	Votes	%	±%
Labour	Jemima Hunt *	635	46.0	2.2 ▲
Independent	Amir Ali	292	21.2	New
Green	Colin Aldridge	284	20.6	6.3 ▼
Liberal Democrats	Graham Jones	98	7.1	0.6 ▼
Conservative	Patricia Jones	47	3.4	5.1 ▼
TUSC	Stephen Brown	24	1.7	New
Turnout		1380	35.63	
Labour hold				

=== St. Mary's ===
St. Mary's
Party	Candidate	Votes	%	±%
Green	Emily Kerr	893	45.3	4.5 ▼
Labour	Mustafa Barcho	574	29.1	1.9 ▼
Independent	John Skinner	435	22.1	New
Liberal Democrats	Josie Procter	70	3.5	1.1 ▼
Turnout		1972	42.75	
Green hold				

=== Summertown ===
Summertown
Party	Candidate	Votes	%	±%
Liberal Democrats	Katherine Miles *	955	46.4	9.8 ▲
Labour	Christopher Hull	738	35.8	5.7 ▲
Conservative	Mark Beer	229	11.1	4.7 ▼
Green	Indrani Sigamany	138	6.7	9.6 ▼
Turnout		2060	48.34	
Liberal Democrats hold				

=== Temple Cowley ===
Temple Cowley
Party	Candidate	Votes	%	±%
Independent	Saj Malik *	841	47.4	15.4 ▲
Labour	Simon Ottino	709	40.0	8.0 ▲
Green	Matthew Ledbury	110	6.2	7.9 ▼
Liberal Democrats	Tony Brett	57	3.2	3.6 ▼
Conservative	Madelein Dewar	56	3.2	3.4 ▼
Turnout		1773	40.32	
Independent hold				

=== Walton Manor ===
Walton Manor
Party	Candidate	Votes	%	±%
Labour	Louise Upton *	862	50.8	1.4 ▲
Liberal Democrats	Liz Wade	485	28.6	0.5 ▲
Green	Peter Thompson	196	11.6	New
Conservative	Penelope Lenon	153	9.0	0.5 ▲
Turnout		1696	43.12	
Labour hold				

=== Wolvercote ===
Wolvercote
Party	Candidate	Votes	%	±%
Liberal Democrats	Jo Sandelson	964	55.7	16.5 ▲
Labour	Andrew Siantonas	363	21.0	6.0 ▲
Conservative	Robin Morrisen	238	13.8	1.4 ▼
Green	Philippa Lanchbery	165	9.5	7.2 ▼
Turnout		1730	47.82	
Liberal Democrats hold				

== By-elections ==
=== Hinksey Park ===
Hinksey Park: 29 September 2022
Party	Candidate	Votes	%	±%
Labour	Anna Railton	801	51.1	
Green	Alex Powell	305	19.4	
Independent	Deborah Glass Woodin	270	17.2	
Liberal Democrats	Richard Tanner	118	7.5	
Conservative	Jennifer Saunders	60	3.9	
TUSC	Callum Joyce	8	0.5	
Majority		496	31.7	
Turnout		1,567	36.0	
Labour hold		Swing		

=== Littlemore ===
Littlemore: 2 March 2023
Party	Candidate	Votes	%	±%
Labour	Sandy Douglas	607	44.9	
Independent	Michael Evans	507	37.5	
Conservative	Timothy Patmore	135	10.0	
Green	David Thomas	65	4.8	
Liberal Democrats	Theo Jupp	26	1.9	
TUSC	Rachel Cox	12	0.9	
Majority		100	7.4	
Turnout		1,352	34.0	
Labour hold		Swing		
