= 2000 Oxford City Council election =

2000 English local election

Elections to Oxford City Council were held on 4 May 2000. One third of the council seats were up for election. The Labour Party lost its majority on the council to no overall control. The number of Councillors for each party after the election were Labour 21, Liberal Democrat 21, Green 8 and Conservative 1. Overall turnout was 31.1%

== Election result ==
Oxford local election result 2000
Party	Seats	Gains	Losses	Net gain/loss	Seats %	Votes %	Votes	+/−
Liberal Democrats	9	4	0	+4	50.0	30.8	9,930	+2.6%
Labour	5	0	6	-6	27.8	30.4	9,785	-5.9%
Green	3	1	0	+1	16.7	18.6	6,000	+1.4%
Conservative	1	1	0	+1	5.6	19.5	6,301	+2.4%
Independent	0	0	0	0	0	0.4	120	-0.6%
Liberal	0	0	0	0	0	0.3	98	+0.0%

== Ward results ==
Blackbird Leys
Party	Candidate	Votes	%	±%
Labour	Patrick Stannard	594	61.4	−11.9
Conservative	Laura Postlethwaite	179	18.5	+9.1
Green	Patricia Dickson	97	10.0	+1.1
Liberal Democrats	Alexander Macfie	97	10.0	+1.6
Majority		415	42.9	−21.0
Turnout		967	12.3	−1.3
Labour hold		Swing		

Central
Party	Candidate	Votes	%	±%
Green	Paul Ingram	488	30.5	−7.0
Liberal Democrats	Antony Brett	456	28.5	+1.4
Labour	Edward Turner	409	25.6	+9.4
Conservative	Andrea Cummins	245	15.3	−3.9
Majority		32	2.0	−8.4
Turnout		1,598	25.5	+7.1
Green hold		Swing		

Cherwell
Party	Candidate	Votes	%	±%
Liberal Democrats	David Connett	923	44.1	+6.6
Conservative	Simon Mort	757	36.2	+2.2
Labour	Patricia Brown	272	13.0	−6.6
Green	Stella Hudson	141	6.7	−2.1
Majority		166	7.9	+4.4
Turnout		2,093	41.0	+2.7
Liberal Democrats hold		Swing		

East
Party	Candidate	Votes	%	±%
Labour	Richard Tarver	790	45.5	+4.9
Green	Gail Hemming	680	39.2	−9.2
Conservative	William Coulstock	151	8.7	+2.9
Liberal Democrats	Pieter-Paul Barker	115	6.6	+1.4
Majority		110	6.3	−1.5
Turnout		1,736	29.7	−1.7
Labour hold		Swing		

Headington
Party	Candidate	Votes	%	±%
Liberal Democrats	Stephen Fairweather-Tall	832	44.4	
Labour	Leslie Town	582	31.1	
Conservative	William Clare	372	19.9	
Green	Andrew Taylor	86	4.6	
Turnout		1,872	29.4	+0.4
Liberal Democrats gain from Labour		Swing		

Iffley
Party	Candidate	Votes	%	±%
Liberal Democrats	David Penwarden	933	44.5	+32.8
Labour	Bryan Keen	614	29.3	−22.3
Conservative	James French	353	16.8	−7.3
Green	Nuala Young	195	9.3	−3.4
Majority		319	15.2	−12.3
Turnout		2,095	37.4	+12.1
Liberal Democrats gain from Labour		Swing		

Littlemore
Party	Candidate	Votes	%	±%
Labour	Gillian Sanders	493	42.3	−20.2
Conservative	John Young	390	33.4	+16.5
Liberal Democrats	Vicky Potter	171	14.7	+4.4
Green	Daniel O'Brien	112	9.6	−0.6
Majority		103	8.9	−36.7
Turnout		1,166	22.8	+2.3
Labour hold		Swing		

Marston
Party	Candidate	Votes	%	±%
Conservative	Barbara Burgess	760	46.9	+19.1
Labour	Sam Timms	516	31.9	−15.3
Green	Katherine Wedell	183	11.3	−1.4
Liberal Democrats	Stephen Howarth	161	9.9	−2.4
Majority		244	15.0	−4.4
Turnout		1,620	33.8	+5.7
Conservative gain from Labour		Swing		

North
Party	Candidate	Votes	%	±%
Liberal Democrats	Jean Fooks	825		
Liberal Democrats	Stephen Brown	677		
Green	Donald O'Neal	374		
Labour	Cherry Mosteshar	320		
Green	Donald Smith	316		
Conservative	Elizabeth Prypr	285		
Conservative	Robert Porter	280		
Labour	Stuart Skyte	263		
Independent	John Rose	120		
Turnout		3,460	31.1	−1.0
Liberal Democrats hold		Swing		

Old Marston & Risinghurst
Party	Candidate	Votes	%	±%
Liberal Democrats	Mark Whittaker	699	40.9	−9.9
Labour	Kenji Tiwari	544	31.9	+4.0
Conservative	Duncan Hatfield	390	22.8	+5.2
Green	Pritam Singh	75	4.4	+0.7
Majority		155	9.0	−13.9
Turnout		1,708	34.8	−1.1
Liberal Democrats gain from Labour		Swing		

Quarry
Party	Candidate	Votes	%	±%
Liberal Democrats	Julian Allison	929	49.1	+6.2
Labour	Andrew Brown	496	26.2	−11.8
Conservative	Philip Hodgson	358	18.9	+4.4
Green	Tracy Dighton-Brown	108	5.7	+1.1
Majority		433	22.9	+18.0
Turnout		1,891	31.5	−3.6
Liberal Democrats gain from Labour		Swing		

St. Clement's
Party	Candidate	Votes	%	±%
Green	Jacob Sanders	897	47.9	+4.3
Labour	Mohammad Abbasi	617	33.0	+2.5
Conservative	Thomas Garner	211	11.3	+3.6
Liberal Democrats	Martin Stone	146	7.8	+1.8
Majority		280	14.9	+1.8
Turnout		1,871	24.6	−0.3
Green hold		Swing		

South
Party	Candidate	Votes	%	±%
Green	Deborah Glass	1,202	46.2	+5.8
Labour	John Tanner	961	37.0	−5.9
Conservative	Prudence Dailey	299	11.5	+1.5
Liberal Democrats	Mark Hinnells	137	5.3	−1.4
Majority		241	9.2	+6.7
Turnout		2,599	42.1	+4.1
Green gain from Labour		Swing		

Temple Cowley
Party	Candidate	Votes	%	±%
Liberal Democrats	Robert Hoyle	865	51.0	−0.5
Labour	Francine Baker	503	29.6	−5.7
Conservative	Georgina Shomroni	193	11.4	+2.9
Green	Lilia Patterson	136	8.0	+3.3
Majority		362	21.4	+5.2
Turnout		1,697	30.1	−3.0
Liberal Democrats hold		Swing		

West
Party	Candidate	Votes	%	±%
Labour	Susanna Pressel	1,011	45.7	+5.0
Liberal Democrats	Valerie Harris	832	37.6	+7.8
Green	Carole Guberman	187	8.5	−11.7
Conservative	Steven Doody	183	8.3	−1.0
Majority		179	8.1	−2.8
Turnout		2,213	38.7	+3.2
Labour hold		Swing		

Wolvercote
Party	Candidate	Votes	%	±%
Liberal Democrats	Stephen Goddard	1,001	43.4	−2.2
Green	Michael Buck	556	24.1	+12.5
Conservative	Jason Tomes	542	23.5	−5.6
Labour	Wendy Piatt	207	9.0	−4.7
Majority		445	19.3	+2.8
Turnout		2,306	39.7	−1.5
Liberal Democrats hold		Swing		

Wood Farm
Party	Candidate	Votes	%	±%
Labour	Peter Johnson	593	44.2	−11.2
Conservative	Christopher Connolly	353	26.3	+11.2
Green	David Dalton	167	12.4	+2.0
Liberal Democrats	Bernard Gowers	131	9.8	−2.6
Liberal	Roger Jenking	98	7.3	+0.6
Majority		240	17.9	−22.4
Turnout		1,342	24.5	+2.1
Labour hold		Swing		

== See also ==
- 2000 United Kingdom local elections
- Elections in the United Kingdom
