= Oliver Tickell =

British journalist, author and campaigner

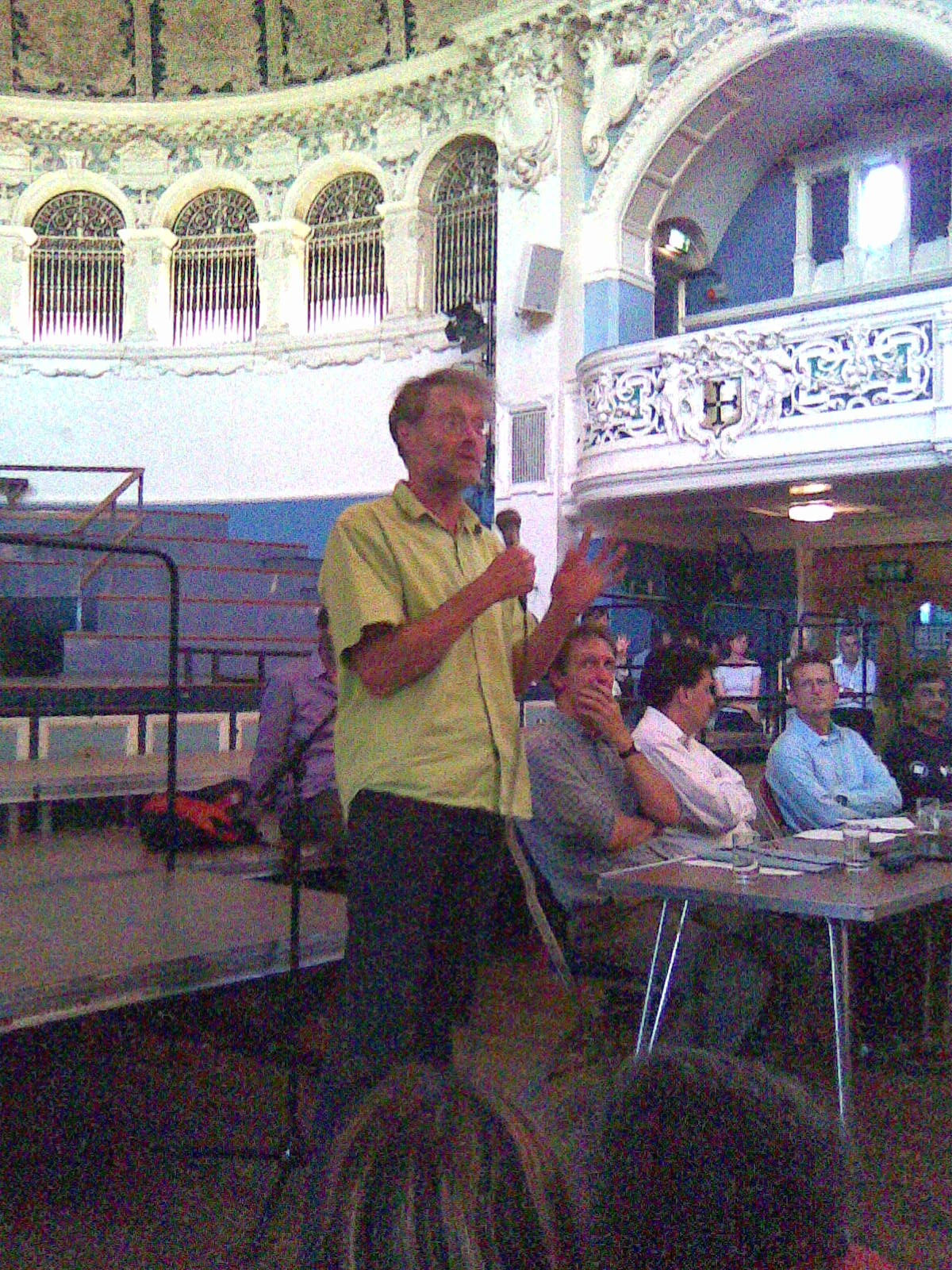
Oliver Tickell explaining his book Kyoto2 in the presence of Ed Miliband at Oxford Town Hall

Oliver Tickell is a British journalist, author and campaigner on health and environment issues, and author of the book Kyoto2 which sets out a blueprint for effective global climate governance. His articles have been published in all the broadsheet newspapers and numerous magazines including New Scientist, New Statesman and The Economist. He is an experienced broadcaster on the BBC home and world services including "Today", "PM", "Costing the Earth", "Farming World" and "Farming Today". He studied physics at Oxford University and is a founding fellow of the Green Economic Institute.

== Family ==
His father was environmentalist and diplomat Sir Crispin Tickell (1930–2022).

== Green Party candidate ==
In 2002, 2006 and 2010 Oliver Tickell was a candidate in elections for Oxford City Council, representing the Green Party, but was not elected. He also stood for the Greens against Boris Johnson in Henley at the 2001 General Election, finishing fifth, with 2.6% of the vote.

== Editorship of The Ecologist ==
Upon his appointment in October 2013 as editor of The Ecologist Tickell said had been a reader of the magazine since the 1980s and was "ever-mindful of its values and principles. My aim is to manifest those values in a different media landscape and I particularly want to make the website more interactive so it becomes a focus for ideas and debate serving the green movement".

In January 2014 Private Eye magazine criticised Tickell for his publishing of an article by Patrick Haseldine in The Ecologist which attributed the Lockerbie bombing of flight Pan Am 103 to a conspiracy by the apartheid South African government to murder Bernt Carlsson, the UN Assistant Secretary-General and UN Commissioner for Namibia."

== Publications ==
- Kyoto2: How to Manage the Global Greenhouse, London, Zed Books (July 2008) Hardback: ISBN 978-1-84813-024-1 Paperback: ISBN 978-1-84813-025-8 also published in the US by Palgrave.
- "On a planet 4C hotter, all we can prepare for is extinction" The Guardian, Monday 11 August 2008.
- Article: "Thorium: Not 'green', not 'viable', and not likely"
