= Stephen Tall (politician) =

British politician (born 1977)

Stephen Joseph Tall (born 19 March 1977 in Epsom, Surrey) is a Liberal Democrat politician in the City of Oxford, England. From 2007 to 2015, Tall was one of the editors of Liberal Democrat Voice, first as the Editor at Large and then as Co-Editor.

Tall is a research associate at CentreForum and development director at Education Endowment Foundation.

== Early life ==
Tall was born in 1977 in Epsom in Surrey, and brought up in Liverpool, Bristol and Cardiff.

== Education ==
Tall was educated at St Margaret's CE High School, in Aigburth, a suburb of Liverpool, between the years 1988–95, followed by Mansfield College at the University of Oxford, where he read Modern History and achieved an MA in 1998.

== Life and career ==
Tall joined the Labour Party at 16 but left in 1999. He was a city councillor for the Headington ward from 2000 until 2008, and was Deputy Lord Mayor of Oxford from 2007 until 2008. He did not seek re-election to the council in 2008. He has worked as development director at St Anne's College in the University of Oxford and was head of development of the Oxford Libraries until December 2011.

He is now development director for the Education Endowment Foundation and a research associate at CentreForum.

Tall won the Liberal Democrat Blog of the Year award in 2006 for his blog A Liberal goes a long way. The blog was also shortlisted for the New Statesman's New Media Awards 2006 in the Elected Representative category.
