= Mary Clarkson =

British politician

Mary Clarkson (born 1 December 1962) is the former Lord Mayor of Oxford, England. She has been the City Councillor for Marston since 1998, representing the Labour Party.

Clarkson attended St John's College, Oxford, studying English Language and Literature. She previously worked in human resources, management consultancy and employment policy research. She served as Lord Mayor in 2009–10, and currently sits on the Board of Oxford Playhouse.
