= Independent Working Class Association =

- Leader: None
- Founded: 1995
- Dissolved: 2020
- Split from: Red Action; Anti-Fascist Action
- Ideology: Workerism; Anti-multiculturalism; Anti-Fascism
- Colours: Blue
- Slogan: Working-class rule for working-class areas

Website
- http://www.iwca.info/

The Independent Working Class Association (IWCA) was a minor political party in the United Kingdom that aimed to promote the political and economic interests of the working class, regardless of the consequences to existing political and economic structures. It had been most successful in the Blackbird Leys and Wood Farm estates of Oxford and had a councillor on Oxford City Council until 2012, but was ultimately deregistered with the Electoral Commission in November 2020.

== Founding ==
The IWCA was formed in 1995 by several organisations but primarily Red Action and Anti-Fascist Action. Initial sponsors included Communist Action Group, Colin Roach Centre, Open Polemic, Partisan, Red Action, the Revolutionary Communist Group and Socialist Parent. The founding groups argued that the likely election of a New Labour government would entrench the legacy of Thatcherism and further diminish the political influence of the working class. The IWCA describes its ideology as stemming from the trade union collectivism of the 1970s. It has received support from some anarchists, but it criticises the contemporary socialist movement, describing it as "hopelessly middle class – and obsessed with Identity Politics".

"We don't really recognise the term left anymore, because looking around I don't see any of the people that profess to be left or socialist as actually pro-working class."

— Stuart Craft

From 1998, the IWCA formed groups in Birmingham, Oxford, Glasgow, the London boroughs of Islington and Hackney, and a few other areas. In 2003, it launched as a national organisation.

The IWCA slogan is "working class rule in working class areas", and its policies are based on door-to-door surveying of people and asking them what are the problems where they live, then trying to work out ways of resolving them. In Birmingham and Oxford this meant working with local people on issues of anti-social behaviour, and in Hackney around, for example, school closures.

== Electoral performance ==
IWCA got some of the best results ever in UK politics of independent radical candidates, and several elected in Oxford. In the 2002 Oxford City Council elections the IWCA achieved the election of a local councillor, Stuart Craft, with more than 40% of the vote in Northfield Brook ward. Three more candidates received over 20% of the vote in the local elections in London, in Heaton and Gooshays wards in Havering, Clerkenwell ward in Islington and Haggerston ward in Hackney. They won 22% in Bunhill ward in London in a by-election in 2003.

The IWCA was able to raise the £20,000 required for participation in the 2004 London mayoral election and nominated Lorna Reid, a resident and advice worker on the Highbury council estate. Her campaign focused on opposing anti-social behaviour by funding youth facilities and cleaning up estates, establish community restorative justice schemes, local drugs detox centres and progressive local taxation. Reid came ninth with 9,542 (0.5%) of the first preference votes and 39,678 (2.1%) of the second preferences.

In the local elections that took place on the same day, the IWCA picked up two more seats on Oxford City Council. Maurice Leen contested the seat of Oxford East for the IWCA in the 2005 UK general election, receiving 892 votes (2.1%).

At the 2006 local elections, they stood six candidates and gained a further seat from Labour, taking their total to four. However, they lost two of their Oxford council seats to Labour in May 2008. One of their councillors, Jane Lacey, stood down in 2010 to continue as a community campaigner, saying that she was disillusioned by the politics of the council.

In 2008, the Thurrock branch of the IWCA contested the seat of Stanford East and Corringham Town ward and came last with 98 votes, down from last with 144 votes in 2007 and behind the BNP's 344 votes.

In March 2012 Stuart Craft, the last remaining IWCA local councillor in Oxford, announced to the Oxford Mail that he would not stand again in the May elections, after ten years as an IWCA councillor. He said, "I couldn't stand on people's doorsteps any more, telling them we were going to change things when that wasn't going to happen."

The party was deregistered with the Electoral Commission in November 2020.

== History ==
In summer 2004, the Hackney branch of the IWCA split away to form Hackney Independent. In 2006, the Oxford branch of the party won a libel action against Bill Baker, Deputy Leader of Oxford City Council, who had posted defamatory material alleging the IWCA had links to violent extremists and Irish Republican groups to homes in Donnington Brook in the run-up to the 2005 local elections. The IWCA, represented in their suit by Carter-Ruck, said it would use the £15,000 it collected in damages to fund their 2006 campaign.

In 2009 the two IWCA Oxford councillors missed a meeting at which an above-inflation rise in council tax of 4.5% was decided, due to work and family commitments. A tied vote was decided by the casting vote of the Labour Lord Mayor.

== Campaigns ==
The IWCA had adopted tactics of community action to tackle anti-social behaviour, which had led to it being accused of vigilantism. In contrast to many other left-wing groups, the IWCA actively campaigned on crime which affected working-class people and a lack of services. It campaigned on issues of local concern such as council housing stock transfers, muggings and inner-city regeneration, and against social harm due to drug abuse. The group also argued that many racial issues were symptoms of the wider issue of social deprivation. It was against what it described as multiculturalism, believing that it encouraged segregation.

== Cultural Impact ==
With its notable electoral results in Oxford in the early to mid-2000s, the IWCA is briefly mentioned in Patrick Keiller's 2010 film Robinson in Ruins, which explores the social, political and natural history of Oxfordshire and its surrounds.
