= Siobhan Benita =

British civil servant (born 1971)

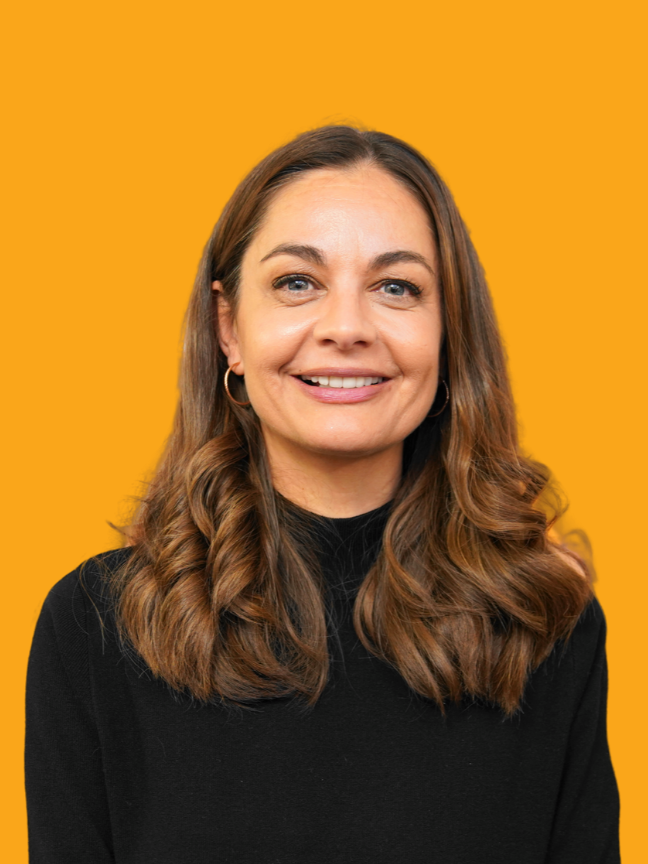
- Siobhan Benita in 2020
- Born: Siobhan Pook; 11 October 1971 (age 54); Wimbledon, London, England
- Education: University of Warwick
- Political party: Independent (2012–2016, 2020–present); Liberal Democrats (2016–2020)
- Spouse: Vincent Benita (m. 1997)
- Children: 2

Siobhan Benita (née Pook; born 11 October 1971) is a British former civil servant. She was an independent candidate in the 2012 London mayoral election. She was then the Liberal Democrat candidate in the London mayoral election originally planned for 2020, but after the election was delayed to 2021, she withdrew as the candidate.

== Early life and education ==
Benita was born Siobhan Pook on 11 October 1971 in Wimbledon, London, and grew up in the borough of Merton. Her Anglo-Indian mother came to London in 1959, and worked as a home help and auxiliary nurse. Benita's father is Cornish; he moved to London, working there as a local primary school teacher, after graduating from Loughborough University. Both of her parents now live in Cornwall.

Benita studied at the University of Warwick.

Before joining the Liberal Democrats, Benita said she "voted Labour in the past, and that's where my heart lies".

== Career ==
Benita joined the Department for Transport in 1996, having entered the Civil Service on the Fast Stream graduate programme.

In 2006, after 10 years as a policy adviser on transport, local government and environment issues, she moved to the Cabinet Office where she worked with the then new Cabinet Secretary, Gus O'Donnell, to improve civil service governance, strategy and communications. During her time in the Cabinet Office she established Civil Service Live, in partnership with Civil Service World publisher Dods. She worked on the Civil Service Awards and "Tabelle", a network for women who work in, or with, the public sector.

In 2009, she joined the Department of Health as head of corporate management. She resigned from the department in October 2011, in part to protest against NHS reforms. This allowed her to stand as an independent candidate in the 2012 London mayoral election.

In 2013, she joined the economics department at the University of Warwick and set up the Warwick Policy Lab. Then, in 2014, Benita became the economics department's chief policy and strategy officer. She stepped down from that role in August 2016 to become the chief strategy officer of the unit set up by the university in 2016 to develop its presence and activity in London.

== In politics ==
Benita stood as an independent candidate in the 2012 London mayoral election. She came fifth with 3.8% of the vote, within 8,000 votes of fourth-placed Liberal-Democrat candidate Brian Paddick. She indicated at the time that she intended to stay in politics and hoped to run again in the 2016 London mayoral elections, although she eventually decided not to.

In 2016, she joined the Liberal Democrats, shortly after the 2016 European Union referendum claiming it was the "only true pro-remain party". In November 2018, she was selected as the Liberal Democrat candidate for the 2020 London mayoral election. In November 2019, Benita said that money from unused Oyster cards should be used to help fight homelessness. Benita launched her campaign for the 2020 London mayoral election on 13 February 2020. She said she wanted to legalise cannabis in London in a bid to tackle rising levels of knife crime. She stated she would like to see pilots for legal regulated cannabis across London in order to remove power and money from gangs, free up police time to tackle serious crimes, and raise millions of pounds in tax, which could be invested in youth services and support those addicted to harder drugs. She has also pledged to cut violent crime, cut air pollution, declared an aim to reach zero-carbon by 2030, and reopen closed police stations.

On 27 July 2020, Benita announced her withdrawal from the Lib Dem mayoral candidacy, saying she was unable to commit to another year of campaigning following the election's postponement to 2021 given the unpaid nature of the role.

In August 2020, Benita left the Liberal Democrats, saying she did not wish to be "associated with current events in the London [mayoral] campaign," after one of the two shortlisted candidates to replace Benita, Geeta Sidhu-Robb, was revealed to have made an antisemitic statement about Labour MP Jack Straw while standing against Straw in the 1997 general election as a Conservative. She subsequently announced her support for the Rejoin EU candidate, Richard Hewison.

During the 2024 London mayoral election, Benita expressed her support for the re-election of incumbent Sadiq Khan (Labour).

== Personal life ==
Benita married Vincent Benita in 1997, and has two daughters.
