= 2021 London mayoral election =

- 6 May 2021
- Opinion polls
- Registered: 6,144,225
- Turnout: 42.2% ▼3.1%
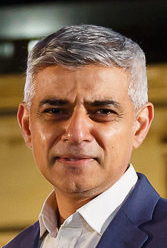

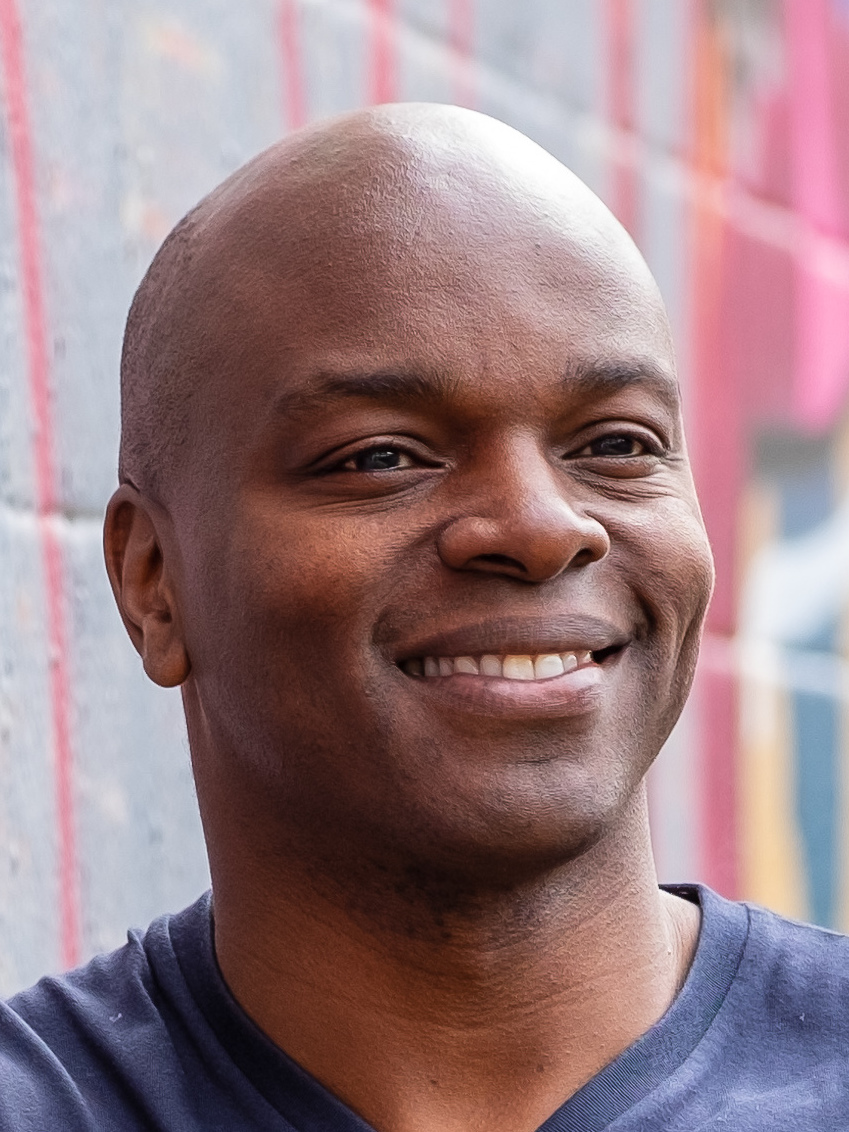

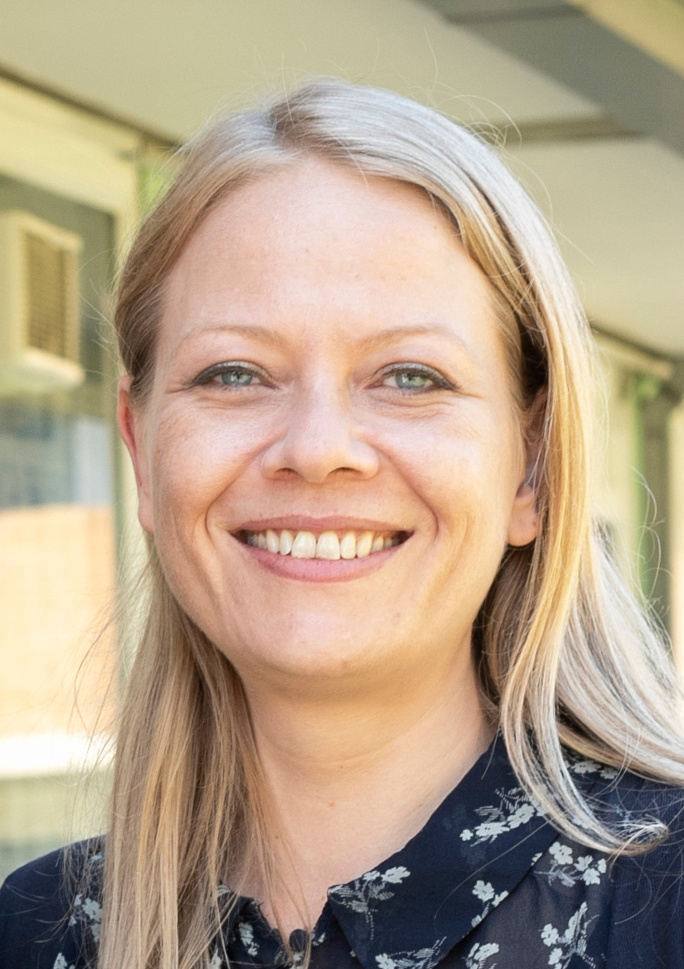
| Candidate | Sadiq Khan | Shaun Bailey | Siân Berry |
| Party | Labour | Conservative | Green |
| First round | 1,013,721; 40.0% ▼4.2pp | 893,051; 35.3% ▲0.2pp | 197,976; 7.8% ▲2.0pp |
| Second round | 1,206,034; 55.2% ▼1.6pp | 977,601; 44.8% ▲1.6pp | Eliminated |
Mayor before election
Sadiq Khan
Labour
Elected Mayor
Sadiq Khan
Labour

The 2021 London mayoral election was held on 6 May 2021 to elect the mayor of London. It was held simultaneously with elections for the London Assembly, other local elections across England and Wales, and devolved elections in Scotland and Wales. The mayoral and Assembly elections were to be held on 7 May 2020, but in March 2020 the government announced the election would be postponed until 2021 due to the COVID-19 pandemic.

Sadiq Khan was re-selected as the Labour candidate in 2018, the Conservative Party selected Shaun Bailey and the Green Party chose Siân Berry. Rory Stewart, a former Conservative MP and minister, ran as an independent before withdrawing due to the delay in the election. Siobhan Benita, who had been the Liberal Democrat candidate, also withdrew after the election delay. She was replaced as the party's candidate by Luisa Porritt. Twenty candidates appeared on the ballot, more than in any previous election for the position.

Sadiq Khan of the Labour Party was re-elected, winning 40% of first preference votes and 55% in a run-off against Bailey.

== Background ==
The mayor of London has responsibilities covering policing, transport, housing, planning, economic development, arts, culture and the environment. They control a budget of around £17 billion per year. Mayors are typically elected for a period of four years, with no limit to the number of terms served. Under the Greater London Authority Act 1999, mayoral elections are held on the first Thursday in May in the fourth calendar year following the previous election, unless varied by an order by the Secretary of State. On 13 March 2020, the government announced the election would be postponed until 2021 due to the COVID-19 pandemic. The change in election date was ignored when calculating the four-yearly election cycle. Consequently, the following election was held in 2024, and Khan served a reduced term of three years. The incumbent mayor, Sadiq Khan, a member of the Labour Party, was elected in the 2016 election, when he defeated the Conservative candidate, Zac Goldsmith.

In the 2018 local elections across Greater London the Labour Party increased its number of council seats to the highest level since 1978. The Liberal Democrats and the Green Party also gained seats. In the 2019 European Parliament elections, the Liberal Democrats came first in London. They won the most votes in the London region with 27%, returning three Members of European Parliament (MEPs), the party's best ever result. The Labour Party came second, with 24% of the vote, losing two seats to end up with two MEPs. The Brexit Party returned two MEPs and the Green Party won 12.5% of the vote, holding its one seat. The Conservative Party failed to get a single MEP elected in London for the first time in the party's history. In the 2019 general election, there was no net change in the number of seats for any party, although several seats changed hands. The biggest changes in vote share were for Labour, who saw a fall of 6.5%, and the Liberal Democrats, who were up 6.1%, compared to the previous 2017 general election.

== Electoral system ==
The election used a supplementary vote system, in which voters express a first and a second preference for candidates.

- If a candidate receives more than 50% of the first preference vote, that candidate wins
- If no candidate receives more than 50% of first preference votes, the top two candidates proceed to a second round and all other candidates are eliminated
- The first preference votes for the remaining two candidates stand in the final count
- Voters' ballots whose first and second preference candidates have both been eliminated are discarded
- Voters whose first preference candidates have been eliminated and whose second preference candidate is one of the top two have their second preference votes added to that candidate's count

This means that the winning candidate has the support of a majority of voters who expressed a preference among the top two. The 2021 election was planned to be the last conducted using the supplementary vote system; in March 2021, the Government indicated its plan to change the voting system to first past the post from 2024.

All registered electors (British, Irish, Commonwealth and European Union citizens) living in London aged 18 or over were entitled to vote in the mayoral election. Those who were temporarily away from London at the time of the election (for example, away working, on holiday, in student accommodation or in hospital) were also entitled to vote in the mayoral election. The deadline to register to vote in the election was 11:59 pm, 19 April 2021.

Mayoral candidates require 66 signatures of people on the electoral register in London supporting the nomination, 2 from each of the 32 London boroughs and 2 from the City of London, and must give a deposit of £10,000 (returned if they get more than 5% in the election). The required number of signatures was lowered from 330 to reduce person-to-person contact during the COVID-19 pandemic.

Due to measures related to the COVID-19 pandemic, the count was not completed until Sunday 9 May.

== Campaign ==
=== Before the delay (2018–2020) ===
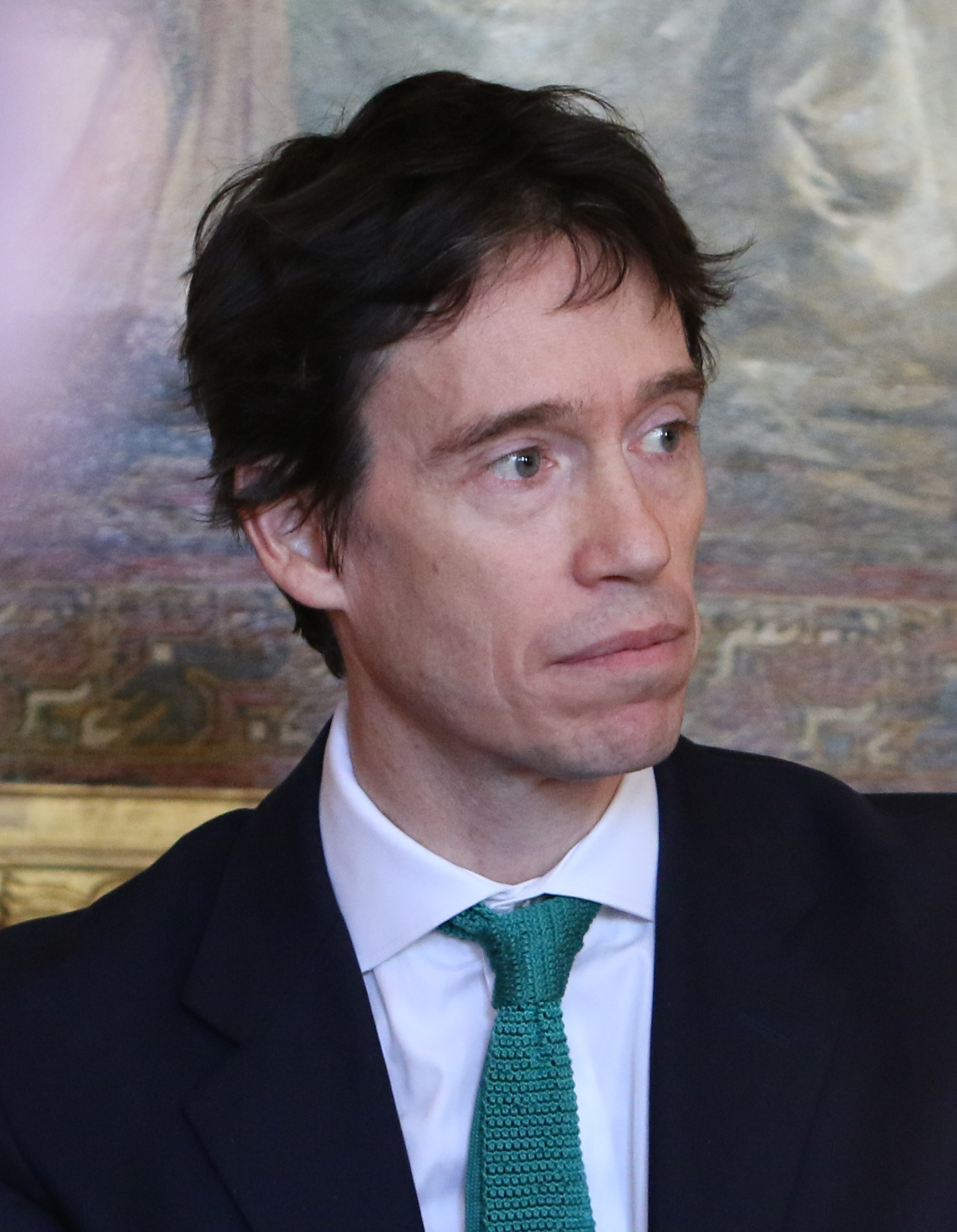
Rory Stewart, a former Conservative MP and minister, started a campaign as an independent before withdrawing after the election was postponed

The incumbent mayor Sadiq Khan announced in June 2018 that he intended to stand for re-election. Later that year, he received enough nominations from local party groups and trade unions affiliated to the Labour Party that he was automatically re-selected to be the party's candidate. His re-selection followed speculation that a figure from the left wing of his party could challenge him for the candidacy. This speculation followed disagreements about the "direction of the party" between Khan and Jeremy Corbyn, who was the leader of the party nationally at the time. Khan announced in early 2020 that part of his election platform would be to deliver a "green new deal for the city". This would include making London carbon neutral by 2030 and opposing building a third runway at Heathrow Airport.

The Conservative Party selected Shaun Bailey as its candidate in September 2018. In his selection campaign, he emphasised fighting crime. This included "maximising" CCTV coverage of London as an alternative to increasing the number of police officers and giving automatic jail terms for acid attacks. In the weeks after his selection, Bailey was criticised for sharing an Islamophobic tweet attacking Sadiq Khan. He was also criticised for controversial views he had published earlier in his career about multiculturalism, Islam and Hinduism. He was the first Conservative mayoral candidate to also stand in the London Assembly election at the same time.

The Green Party chose Siân Berry as their candidate in February 2019. She had been their mayoral candidate in the 2008 and 2016 elections and had served as co-leader of the party since 2018. She launched her campaign with a focus on housing, calling for a "people's land bank" which would let communities bring empty buildings and land back into use.

Siobhan Benita was selected as the Liberal Democrat candidate in November 2018. Benita had run as an independent candidate in the 2012 London mayoral election. She had come in fifth with 3.8% of first preference votes, while the fourth-placed Liberal Democrat candidate Brian Paddick received 4.2%. Benita criticised Khan's action on knife crime in London. She formally launched her campaign for the London mayoral election on 13 February 2020. She said she wants to legalise cannabis in London. This would reduce levels of knife crime, she said, by removing power and money from gangs and freeing up police time. She also pledged to reduce violent crime in general and reopen closed police stations. On the environment, she said she would reduce air pollution and declared an aim to "reach zero-carbon" by 2030.

The former UK Independence Party (UKIP) leader Nigel Farage said in August 2018 that he was considering running as the UKIP candidate. He said that he would be more successful than the Conservatives. He left UKIP in December 2018 and became the leader of the Brexit Party in March 2019.

On 4 October 2019, Rory Stewart announced he was standing as an independent candidate for the London mayoralty. At the time he was sitting as an independent MP. He had been a Conservative MP and came fifth in the Conservative leadership election. He was then expelled from their Parliamentary group due to his opposition to a "no deal" Brexit. He left the House of Commons when he did not contest a seat in the December 2019 general election. In February, he asked for people to sign up for him to stay on their sofa for a night so that he could listen to their concerns.

=== After postponement (2020–2021) ===
On 13 March 2020, the election was delayed to May 2021 due to the ongoing COVID-19 pandemic. Other local elections in England were also delayed. Stewart withdrew from the campaign in May 2020, saying the delay in the election meant it was impractical to sustain a campaign as an independent. He chose not to endorse any other candidate. In July 2020, Benita withdrew from the campaign; she also cited the financial difficulties of sustaining her candidacy. The Liberal Democrats selected Luisa Porritt as their new candidate on 13 October 2020. She called for a curfew on bars and restaurants that was in place as part of pandemic restrictions to be removed.

Following the first COVID-19 lockdown, the United Kingdom saw a sharp fall in public transport use. This led to the government giving Transport for London (TfL) a bailout of £1.6 billion. The national government made the bailout conditional on the London government raising fees on the service, increasing the London congestion charge, ending free bus travel for the young and suspending free travel at certain times for over-60s. Bailey accused Khan of raising the congestion charge, which Full Fact said was inaccurate. The bailout contributed to concern that Boris Johnson's Conservative government wanted to intrude on the mayor's authority. Later in 2020, the housing minister Robert Jenrick sent a letter to Khan which said that the council housing programme and the balloting of council housing estates on any estate changes put into the new 2020 London plan should be dropped. The letter also criticised Khan's proposal for rent controls. On 24 October, Khan wrote on the LabourList blog that he wouldn't support the proposals from the government.

In December 2020, Bailey published leaflets with City Hall branded claiming that Khan was raising council taxes by 21.2%. Lawyers for the Labour Party referred the matter to the Crown Prosecution Service, saying that the leaflets were illegally fraudulent under the Representation of the People Act 1983. In February 2021 The Guardian reported that nearly 40% of donations to Bailey's campaign had come from the businessman Michael Ashcroft.

Tensions arose in some cases around campaigning under lockdown restrictions. On 24 January 2021, Rose and six of his staff were fined by the police for breaking lockdown rules while filming promotional material for his campaign. That month, the government said that door-to-door campaigning or leafleting by individual party activists was not allowed under COVID-19 lockdown restrictions. In February, Rose was stopped by police while canvassing who told him it was not allowed under COVID-19 lockdown restrictions. Rose complained the restrictions prevented him from competing with larger political parties. In March, police visited the Reclaim Party candidate Laurence Fox to warn him about coronavirus regulations.

The Times reported that officials in the Conservative Party had twice tried to remove Bailey as their candidate, but had decided not to as they could not find a "credible alternative".

=== Policy and the short campaign (March 2021 – May 2021) ===
The official Statement of Persons Nominated was published on 31 March. Twenty candidates appeared on the ballot, significantly more than in any previous election for the position.

A number of debates were broadcast. In late April, Khan, Bailey, Berry and Porritt took part in a debate hosted by the BBC and another hosted by ITV.

==== Sadiq Khan ====
On 5 March, Khan launched his campaign for re-election in a café which had received business support from City Hall, including having raised money through a business support scheme Khan had introduced. He announced a programme for his prospective second term focused on economic recovery and employment following the COVID-19 pandemic. This included investing in the West End to attract tourism and supporting people who had lost their jobs to find new work. He also said he would make it easier for businesses to access support. The launch was protested by six residents opposed to a low traffic neighbourhood that Enfield London Borough Council had implemented. He later said he would "kickstart London's sporting economy". This would include seeking for Indian Premier League matches to take place in London. In May, he promised to examine a sustainability-focused bid for London to host the Olympic Games in 2036 or 2040.

On transport and the environment, Khan expressed support for the use of low traffic neighbourhoods and said that roads should be used by "blue light services, to electricians, to plumbers, to commercial drivers, to taxis, to those that need to use our roads—delivery drivers and so forth—rather than individuals that could be walking, cycling and using public transport." He said that if re-elected, he would seek government funding to accelerate TfL's transition to zero-emission buses, so that the move would be complete by 2030 rather than 2037. He also promised to expand the availability of 4G on the London Underground. On 22 April, Khan said he was giving his second preference to Berry and asked his supporters to do the same.

On housing, he set a target of 10,000 new council homes and said he would build more on TfL land. He further said that he would explore options including a fund to allow councils to buy back former council houses, supporting a new factory for off-site construction, and starting a Greater London Authority-owned company to build affordable homes directly. On crime, Khan said he would continue to seek government funding for 6,000 more police officers in London and provide more technology funding to the Metropolitan Police. He also promised to launch an independent commission of experts to study the effects of decriminalising cannabis.

He was endorsed by singer Dua Lipa.

==== Shaun Bailey ====
On 4 March, Bailey claimed that Khan had failed to meet more than half of his 2016 election promises. He said that, if elected, he would start a "London-wide campaign" against litter to remind people to use bins. During a debate on 20 April, he said he would ban Quds Day marches in London. His manifesto proposed an annual festival in the city based on the Edinburgh Festival Fringe.

On transport and the environment, Bailey said he would seek corporate sponsors for London Underground stations to raise money, and start a new bank to finance transport projects, including 4G access on the London Underground. He said he would offer interest-free loans to black cab drivers to pay for 10% of the cost of an electric vehicle, and promised to make TfL's bus fleet zero-emission by 2025. He said that if elected, he would hold a competition to design murals for the city. He also pledged to plant half a million new trees. On tax and the economy, Bailey said he would lobby the government to allow the Greater London Authority to keep the full amount of business rates paid, rather than 75%. He also proposed the establishment of an infrastructure bank to raise private finance for infrastructure probjects, including making repairs to Hammersmith Bridge.

On housing, he said he would start a Greater London Authority-owned company called Housing for London to build houses. He also said he would make beauty an important planning criterion and build 100,000 shared ownership homes which people could buy a share in for £5,000. On crime, Bailey said he would hire 8,000 more police officers and reopen dozens of police stations. He would introduce a fund to help former prisoners get qualifications. He also promised to install a CCTV camera on every bus stop. On 19 April, Bailey said that, if elected, he would "visibly make a difference" to crime in the first hundred days by increasing police patrols and "boost" usage of stop-and-search. He also promised to open a new youth centre in every borough and hire 4,000 youth workers. He said he would require large employers to subject their staff to drug tests and publish league tables of companies with the most and least drug use.

The billionaire property developer Nick Candy led a fundraising campaign for Bailey.

==== Siân Berry ====
In February 2021, Berry said she would focus on LGBT rights. This included making London the most "trans-inclusive city in the world" and protecting LGBT spaces. In an interview in March, she proposed a voluntary increase in the London living wage amongst accredited employers to £14 an hour. She also said she would improve London's bus stops, reduce speed limits with the goal of no road deaths, put more toilets in London Underground stations, and close London City Airport to build houses on the site. Berry published her manifesto in April, which included plans to establish a fund to introduce repair centres and a library of things in each borough.

On transport and the environment, Berry supported the expansion of 4G access across the London Underground. She promised to merge TfL fare zones with the eventual goal of reaching a single fare zone for the entire city. Her manifesto included a proposal to extend London's Ultra Low Emission Zone (ULEZ) to cover the entire city, and a goal to cut traffic in terms of the number of miles travelled by 40% by 2026. She would also implement a pay-as-you-go road pricing scheme. She also promised to end the use of incineration and landfill, making London a zero waste city by 2030. She promised to "gold plate" the green belt to prevent development, and instead plant new woodlands and increase food production on green belt land. She said the next mayor should take direct control of Oxford Street and Kensington High Street to stop local councils blocking cycling schemes and part-pedestrianisation.

On housing, she said she would start a commission to reduce private rent. On tax and the economy, she proposed a "Creative Autonomy Allowance" scheme whereby 1,000 young artists and entrepreneurs would be paid a monthly income for three years to support the start of their careers. On crime, Berry pledged to reduce the number of murders in the city to zero in ten years by investing in preventative measures. She said that violence could be reduced by reallocating police resources away from minor drug offences and large presences at protests. She said she would introduce a target for an even gender balance amongst new Metropolitan Police recruits. She also supported the introduction of supervised injection sites.

==== Luisa Porritt ====
When she was selected, Porritt said that if elected she would use empty office buildings for housing and revive town centres in the suburbs. She said that Low Traffic Neighbourhood plans and the introduction of cycle lanes were being rushed and "a good idea being done the wrong way". In March 2021, she formally launched her campaign. She pledged to diversify high streets away from shops and towards services and start a "London Housing Company" to convert empty buildings and build new housing. She also proposed a trial of a universal basic income for the city.

On transport and the environment, Porritt said she would make the city's rental bicycles free on Sundays for a year, and increase the area covered by rental bicycles to Lewisham and Greenwich. Porritt questioned Khan's environmentalism given his support for the Silvertown Tunnel project, which she called his "dirty little secret". She proposed a road pricing policy to replace the ULEZ, congestion charged and proposed boundary charge. The pay-as-you-go scheme would work by charging drivers based on "the number of journeys you make, the distance travelled, the type of vehicle you have, the level of emissions that produces", and its proceeds would go towards TfL's funding. Her proposals also included establishing ten new parks and including a green roof on all new buildings. On housing, she said she would focus on giving young people access to shelter throughout the year in a bid to end homelessness.

On crime, she said she would double the number of police officers assigned to each ward and investigate reopening thirty police stations. She said she would "effectively legalise cannabis by encouraging the Met Police not to prosecute cannabis crimes".

==== Other candidates ====
On 30 March 2021, Laurence Fox said he had made an agreement with Reform UK leader Richard Tice that Reform UK wouldn't field a candidate in the mayoral election. Tice and other Reform UK members attended Fox's campaign launch that month, while the party's former leader, Nigel Farage, also endorsed Fox. In April, Fox proposed six months of free bus and London Underground travel, saying that the increase in economic activity would pay for the cost of lost fares, which he said would be £500 million. Fox has spread misinformation related to the COVID-19 pandemic and calls the threat of COVID-19 variants "scaremongering". He said that if elected, he would instruct the Metropolitan Police and schools to not enforce pandemic-related restrictions. His campaign was funded by the businessman Jeremy Hosking.

The Guardian noted a wave of social media content creators turning to local elections for content, Niko Omilana, Max Fosh and Brian Rose. Rose, a podcaster who has actively promoted misinformation related to the COVID-19 pandemic, stood for the London Real Party. He was reported to be second favourite in the contest by a bookmaker. He said he had made substantial bets on himself "[b]ut not enough to move the markets." In the run-up to the election, he was polling in the low single figures. He said he had spent more than a million pounds on billboards and that he was "going to pull off the biggest upset in British political history". He pledged that if elected he would build 50,000 new homes on TfL land by Christmas 2021. On 22 April, Lib Dem candidate Luisa Porritt said he should withdraw from the election after the Jewish Leadership Council and the London Jewish Forum described conspiracy theories proposed by David Icke expounded in a video with Rose, which Rose did not challenge, as "clearly antisemitic". During the campaign, a 2018 video of Rose drinking his own urine resurfaced. Speaking about the video, he said "I actually think this shows why I'm the best candidate, I'm open to new ideas."

Mandu Reid, the Women's Equality Party candidate, said that if elected she would offer an extension of the national government's programme of 30 days free childcare to eligible London residents who were retraining after losing their jobs. She also said that she would reallocate money Khan had planned to use to fund more police on the street to 'establish a specialist squad within the Met "to rebuild trust and get justice" for women suffering violence, as part of a "perpetrator strategy"'.

Piers Corbyn, the candidate for the Let London Live party, told the BBC that he would "end lockdown on day one" if he were elected. Corbyn is a conspiracy theorist who has promoted misinformation and conspiracy theories about COVID-19, including calling the virus a "hoax". He is sceptical of climate change and is an anti-vaxxer. He has been fined and arrested during the campaign for breaches of COVID-19 lockdown restrictions, including an arrest on suspicion of malicious communications and public nuisance over his distributing a leaflet comparing COVID-19 vaccination programme with the Nazi concentration camp at Auschwitz. His policy platform includes a pledge to prevent extension of London's Ultra Low Emission Zone.

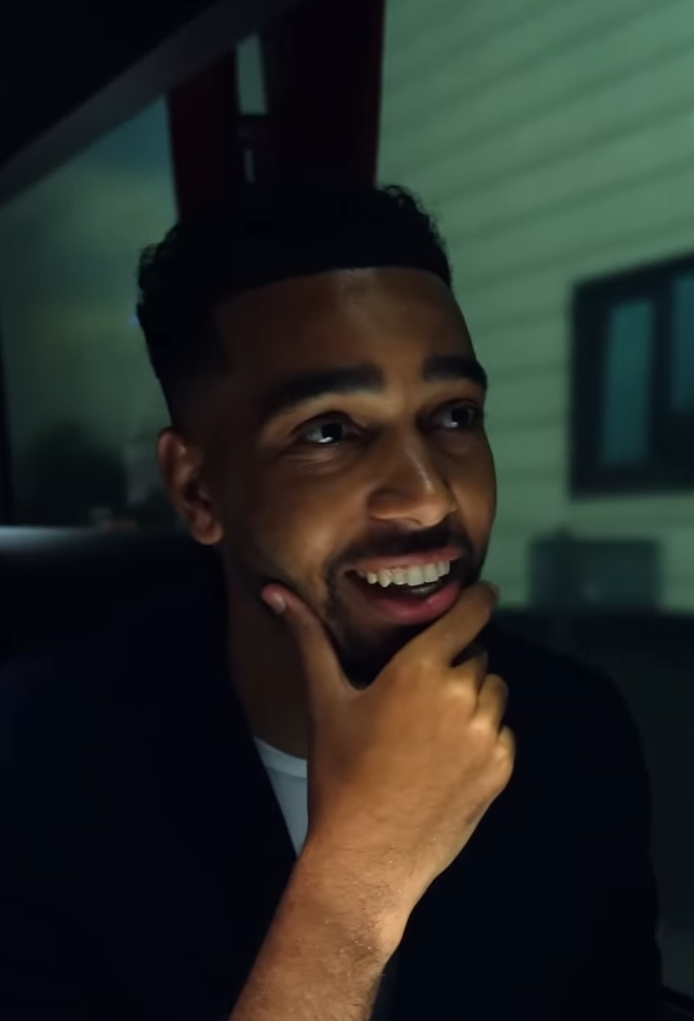
Niko Omilana, a British YouTuber and content creator, ran as an independent candidate.

Count Binface, the satirical candidate for the Count Binface Party, pledged to rename London Bridge the Phoebe Waller Bridge. His manifesto also included a croissant price cap and tying government officials' pay to nurses' pay. He said that he wasn't going to win, but that the supplementary vote system meant that voters could give him their first preference and vote for or against Khan with their second preference.

On 21 April, an opinion poll showed the independent candidate Niko Omilana, a YouTuber who makes prank videos, on 5% of the vote, ahead of all candidates other than Khan, Bailey, Berry and Porritt. His policy platform centred on telling the prime minister Boris Johnson to "shush". Omilana's manager said "it's an investment for him" as more brands would be interested in working with him after the campaign. Omilana was endorsed by fellow YouTubers Keemstar and KSI. Max Fosh, another YouTuber standing in the election, "urged people not to vote for him" and used his platform to encourage young people to vote and to troll Fox.

Valerie Brown, the Burning Pink candidate, was arrested in the early hours of Saturday 8 May, between the election and the announcement of the results. Her campaign manager, Ramon Salgado-Touzon, was arrested on Friday 7 May. Both were accused of criminal damage after spraying pink paint on offices of The Guardian newspaper. Brown was previously arrested and charged with criminal damage of windows at HSBC's headquarters on 22 April.

== Candidates ==
=== Labour Party ===
The incumbent mayor Sadiq Khan, who announced in June 2018 that he would run for re-election, became Labour's candidate after more than half of local parties and party affiliates in London voted to automatically reselect him. The comedian Eddie Izzard and Tottenham MP David Lammy had been suggested as potential candidates for the party.

=== Conservative Party ===
Shaun Bailey was selected as the candidate of the Conservative Party in September 2018. Bailey has been a member of the London Assembly since 2016, having worked as a youth worker and as a special adviser to David Cameron.

The party had started the process for selecting their candidate in June 2018. The Guardian reported that more than twenty prospective candidates applied, mostly from local government. A longlist of ten was published in July 2018. Following interviews, the party produced a shortlist of three for London members of the Conservative Party to vote on using a preferential voting system. To vote, members needed to reside in London and to have been members on 26 June 2018.

Bailey had been endorsed in the party's selection process by the Evening Standard, as well as Conservative police and crime commissioners Anthony Stansfeld, David Lloyd, Matthew Scott and Roger Hirst.

Conservative London mayoral candidate selection
| Party | Candidate | 1st round | | 2nd round | | | 1st round votesTransfer votes, 2nd round |
| Party | Candidate | Total | Of round | Transfers | Total | Of round | 1st round votesTransfer votes, 2nd round |
|---|---|---|---|---|---|---|---|
| Conservative | Shaun Bailey | 3,164 | 43.2% | 740 | 3,904 | 55.1% | |
| Conservative | Andrew Boff | 2,591 | 35.4% | 595 | 3,186 | 44.9% | |
| Conservative | Joy Morrissey | 1,566 | 21.4% | | | | |

Selection process

Shortlisted

- Shaun Bailey, Member of the London Assembly since 2016
- Andrew Boff, Member of the London Assembly since 2008
- Joy Morrissey, councillor in Ealing since 2014, was subsequently elected as the Member of Parliament for Beaconsfield in 2019

Longlisted but not shortlisted

- Duwayne Brooks, former Liberal Democrat Lewisham councillor and friend of Stephen Lawrence
- Alison Cork, interiors expert and entrepreneur
- Kevin Davis, former leader of Kingston upon Thames council
- Simone Finn, member of the House of Lords
- Ruby McGregor-Smith, member of the House of Lords
- Kulveer Ranger, former Director of Environment, Digital London and Environment for former mayor Boris Johnson
- Andrew Rosindell, MP for Romford since 2001

Applied but not longlisted

- Nimco Ali, director of Daughters of Eve, Women's Equality Party candidate for Hornsey and Wood Green in 2017
- Richard Tice, businessman and campaigner (joined the Brexit Party in 2019)

Previously discussed as potential candidates

- Nick de Bois, MP for Enfield North from 2010 to 2015
- Karren Brady, TV personality and life peer since 2014
- Sol Campbell, former footballer
- James Cleverly, MP for Braintree since 2015
- Sajid Javid, then Chancellor of the Exchequer, MP for Bromsgrove since 2010
- Jo Johnson, MP for Orpington from 2010 to 2019; brother of former mayor Boris Johnson
- Justine Greening, MP for Putney from 2005 to 2019, former Secretary of State for Education (2016–2018)
- Syed Kamall, former MEP for London (2005 to 2019)
- Munira Mirza, former deputy mayor for education and culture of London
- George Osborne, editor of the Evening Standard, former Chancellor of the Exchequer (2010–2016) and MP for Tatton (2001–2017)
- Ed Vaizey, MP for Wantage since 2005, former Minister of State for Culture, Communications and Creative Industries (2010–2016)

=== Green Party ===
Siân Berry, who has been a Member of the London Assembly since 2016 and was co-leader of the Green Party from 2018 to 2021, was announced as the party's mayoral candidate on 14 February 2019. She had been the party's candidate for mayor of London in 2008, when she came fourth with 3.2% of the first preference vote, and in 2016, when she came third with 5.8% of the first preference vote. Nominations had opened in November 2018 and closed in January 2019, with four candidates duly nominated. The other nominated candidates were former deputy leader and candidate for the UK Parliament, London Assembly and European Parliament Shahrar Ali, actor and Cities of London and Westminster December 2019 candidate Zack Polanski, as well as former senior civil servant, general election candidate and London Assembly candidate Peter Underwood.

=== Liberal Democrats ===
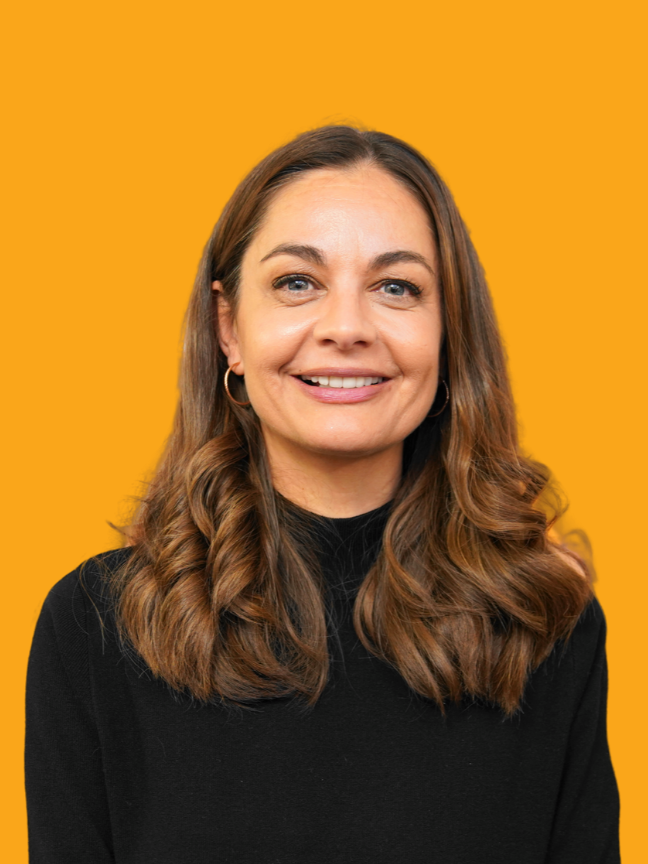
Siobhan Benita was initially selected as the Liberal Democrat candidate before withdrawing after the postponement of the election to 2021

Luisa Porritt, a former Member of the European Parliament from 2019 to 2020 and a councillor in Camden, was selected as the party's candidate in October 2020. Initially, the party had selected Siobhan Benita, a former senior civil servant and 2012 independent candidate for London mayor. Benita withdrew in July 2020 after the election was postponed to 2021.

In the first selection process, Benita was chosen to be the Liberal Democrat candidate on 21 November 2018. The other shortlisted candidates were the anti-Brexit campaigner and former and 2020 London Assembly candidate Rob Blackie, Ebookers founder Dinesh Dhamija, and former parliamentary candidate, consultant and 2020 London Assembly candidate Lucy Salek. Benita came first among first preferences, but with less than half the votes. After last-placed Lucy Salek was eliminated and second preferences among her voters tallied, Benita had a majority of the votes cast and was chosen as the party's candidate.

The former Conservative parliamentary candidates Azi Ahmed and Kishan Devani had previously been discussed as potential Liberal Democrat candidates for the mayoralty, as had Rachel Johnson, a journalist and sister of Boris Johnson, the Conservative Prime Minister and a former mayor of London.

Liberal Democrat London mayoral candidate selection
| Party | Candidate | 1st round | | 2nd round | | | 1st round votesTransfer votes, 2nd round |
| Party | Candidate | Total | Of round | Transfers | Total | Of round | 1st round votesTransfer votes, 2nd round |
|---|---|---|---|---|---|---|---|
| Liberal Democrats | Siobhan Benita | 1,548 | 46.2% | 223 | 1,771 | 54.2% | |
| Liberal Democrats | Rob Blackie | 614 | 18.3% | 169 | 783 | 24.0% | |
| Liberal Democrats | Dinesh Dhamija | 614 | 18.3% | 98 | 712 | 21.8% | |
| Liberal Democrats | Lucy Salek | 576 | 17.2% | | | | |

However, on 27 July 2020, Benita announced her withdrawal from the candidacy, saying she was unable to commit to another year of campaigning following the election's postponement to 2021 given the unpaid nature of the role. The party began a new selection process following Benita's withdrawal. A shortlist of two candidates was announced on 10 September: Luisa Porritt and Geeta Sidhu-Robb. Porritt had served as an MEP for London from 2019 to 2020 and as a councillor on Camden London Borough Council from 2018, having become group leader earlier in September 2020. Sidhu-Robb had previously worked as a lawyer, and was the founder and chief executive of the health company Nosh Detox. She had formerly served as the vice-chair of the People's Vote campaign and served as chair of its successor, Democracy Unleashed.

On 13 September, two days after the shortlist was announced, footage of Sidhu-Robb from the 1997 general election, when she was the Conservative candidate for the seat of Blackburn, re-emerged in which Sidhu-Robb said (in what has been reported to be Urdu or Gujarati), "Don't vote for a Jew, Jack Straw is a Jew. If you vote for him, you're voting for a Jew. Jews are the enemies of Muslims". A few hours later, Sidhu-Robb was suspended from the party and as a candidate. Sidhu-Robb apologised for the comments and said she had regretted making them at the time. Following these events, Benita revealed that she had not only stood down as candidate, but had also resigned from the party.

As a result, a vote among the membership was held on the same timetable, but with Porritt standing against only the option to reopen nominations. The result was announced on 13 October 2020, with Porritt being selected.

| Candidate | Votes | % |
|---|---|---|
| Luisa Porritt | 3,722 | 87.9% |
| Reopen nominations | 514 | 12.1% |
| Turnout | 4,236 | 19.1% |

=== Other parties and candidates ===
The following people also stood.

| Party | Candidate | Notes/Sources |
|---|---|---|
| Renew Party | Kam Balayev | Candidate has worked in international law and business. Balayev campaigned for a Universal Basic Income, cheaper transport costs and more support for small businesses. |
| Count Binface Party | Count Binface | Satirical candidate created by comedian Jon Harvey, as an independent. He crowdfunded the £10,000 deposit required. |
| The Burning Pink Party | Valerie Brown | Brown stood on a one policy platform to abolish government and the role of Mayor of London, and for power to be placed in the hands of the people, through citizens' assemblies. Brown had been arrested and charged earlier in 2021 for covering a number of political parties' and charities' buildings in pink paint, protesting against their inaction on climate change. She later became a supporter of Just Stop Oil. |
| Let London Live | Piers Corbyn | Piers Corbyn is the older brother of the former Labour Party leader Jeremy Corbyn. He is a freelance meteorologist, climate change denier and conspiracy theorist whose campaign focused on spreading COVID-19 conspiracy theories, anti-vaccine propaganda and other misinformation. |
| Independent | Max Fosh | YouTuber known for making videos based around publicity stunts. |
| Reclaim | Laurence Fox | Actor. |
| UK Independence Party | Peter Gammons | Motivational speaker and former Brexit Party member who defected to UKIP in September 2019. |
| Rejoin EU | Richard Hewison | Campaigned for the UK to rejoin the Erasmus Programme and more support for the performing arts sector. Hewison was supported by Volt Europa. |
| Animal Welfare Party | Vanessa Hudson | Hudson campaigned to push for carbon net zero status in London by 2025, prioritise cleaning up the Thames, and the development of vertical farms. |
| Social Democratic Party | Steve Kelleher | Unsuccessful Brexit Party candidate for the London constituency of Eltham in the 2019 general election. |
| Heritage Party | David Kurten | Serving member of the London Assembly (elected as UKIP) who announced his intention to campaign on a socially conservative platform. He campaigned for the removal of all cycle lanes, an end to buffer zones outside abortion clinics and more support for black cabs. |
| Independent | Farah London | London stood with a focus on the cost of living in London and public safety. She also plans to reduce the congestion charge in London. She had been involved with the Conservative Party. |
| Independent | Niko Omilana | Barnet-based YouTuber, known for making prank videos. |
| Independent | Nims Obunge | Pastor and the chief executive of knife-crime awareness organisation The Peace Alliance. |
| Women's Equality Party | Mandu Reid | Reid is the party's leader and has worked for all three previous mayors as a project worker in City Hall. She campaigned on a platform of social justice, gender equality and inclusion. |
| London Real Party | Brian Rose | Podcaster who has actively promoted misinformation related to the COVID-19 pandemic, stood as an independent. |

=== Candidates who had indicated intention to stand ===
Environmental campaigner Rosalind Readhead intended to stand, but withdrew from the race 30 March 2021 to help stop the environmental vote being split. London-based rapper Drillminister had announced his candidacy as an independent candidate, campaigning on reducing homelessness, improving transport, increasing mental health support, diversifying the Metropolitan Police Service and rehabilitation to curb crime and improving air quality in the capital. Charlie Mullins, founder of Pimlico Plumbers, had announced he would stand as an independent. Winston McKenzie, an activist and perennial candidate, had also announced he was intending to stand for the party he founded and leads, Unity in Action. Drillminister, Mullins and McKenzie were all absent from the list of candidates nominated.

== Opinion polls ==
=== Graphical summary ===
The chart below shows opinion polls conducted for the 2021 London mayoral election. The trend lines are local regressions (LOESS).

=== After May 2020 ===
| Date(s) conducted | Pollster | Client | Sample size | First preference | | | | | | Final round | | |
| Date(s) conducted | Pollster | Client | Sample size | Khan | Bailey | Berry | Porritt | Others | Lead | Khan | Bailey | Lead |
| Date(s) conducted | Pollster | Client | Sample size | Lab | Con | Green | Lib Dem | Others | Lead | Lab | Con | Lead |
|---|---|---|---|---|---|---|---|---|---|---|---|---|
| 6 May 2021 | 2021 mayoral election | | – | 40.0% | 35.3% | 7.8% | 4.4% | 12.5% | 4.7% | 55.2% | 44.8% | 10.4% |
| 2–4 May 2021 | YouGov | N/A | 1,141 | 43% | 31% | 10% | 5% | 11% Fox (Reclaim): 3% Rose (LRP): 2% Reid (WEP): 1% Gammons (UKIP): 1% Kurten (Heritage): 0% Others: 4% | 12% | 59% | 41% | 18% |
| 29 Apr – 4 May 2021 | Savanta ComRes | N/A | 1,000 | 41% | 29% | 5% | 8% | 17% Omilana (Ind): 6% Other: 11% | 12% | 60% | 40% | 20% |
| 28 Apr – 3 May 2021 | Opinium | Evening Standard | 1,005 | 48% | 29% | 7% | 8% | 8% Fox (Reclaim): 3% Reid (WEP): 1% Others: 4% | 19% | 63% | 37% | 26% |
| 13–19 Apr 2021 | Savanta ComRes | ITV London | 1,004 | 41% | 28% | 6% | 8% | 17% Omilana (Ind): 5% Rose (LRP): 2% London (Ind): 2% Fox (Reclaim): 1% Gammons (UKIP): 1% Hewison (REUP): 1% Kurten (Heritage): 1% Binface (CBP): 1% Obunge (Ind): 1% Fosh (Ind): 1% Reid (WEP): 1% Balayev (Renew): <1% Corbyn (LLL): <1% Hudson (AWP; Kelleher (SDP): <1% Brown (BP): 0% | 13% | 61% | 39% | 22% |
| 15–16 apr 2021 | Redfield and Wilton Strategies | N/A | 1,500 | 47% | 26% | 6% | 9% | 13% Reid (WEP): 4% Gammons (UKIP): 3% Others on 6% | 21% | — | — | — |
| 7–10 Apr 2021 | Opinium | N/A | 1,093 | 51% | 29% | 8% | 8% | 3% Gammons (UKIP): 1% Reid (WEP): 0% Others: 2% | 22% | 64% | 36% | 28% |
| 29 Mar – 1 Apr 2021 | YouGov | Queen Mary University of London | 1,192 | 47% | 26% | 9% | 7% | 11% Fox (Reclaim Party): 4% Rose (London Real Party): 3% Gammons (UKIP): 1% Reid (WEP): 1% Kurten (Heritage Party): 0% Others: 2% | 21% | 66% | 34% | 32% |
| 17–20 Mar 2021 | Opinium | Evening Standard | 1,500 | 53% | 28% | 7% | 7% | 5% Gammons (UKIP): 2% Reid (WEP): 1% Others: 2% | 25% | 66% | 34% | 32% |
| 6–8 Mar 2021 | Redfield and Wilton Strategies | N/A | 1,500 | 51% | 25% | 6% | 8% | 9% Reid (WEP): 4% Gammons (UKIP): 2% Others: 3% | 25% | — | — | — |
| 13–14 Jan 2021 | Redfield and Wilton Strategies | N/A | 1,500 | 49% | 28% | 10% | 11% | 5% Gammons (UKIP): 2% Others: 3% | 21% | — | — | — |
| 16–19 Nov 2020 | YouGov | Queen Mary University of London | 1,048 | 51% | 30% | 9% | 4% | 5% | 21% | 64% | 36% | 28% |
| 15–17 Oct 2020 | Redfield and Wilton Strategies | N/A | 2,000 | 50% | 28% | 10% | 10% | 2% | 22% | — | — | — |
| 7–8 Sep 2020 | Redfield and Wilton Strategies | N/A | 2,000 | 48% | 28% | 9% | 11% (Note: At this point, Siobhan Benita had withdrawn and Luisa Porritt had not yet been selected, so the question asked about "a Liberal Democrat candidate".) | 4% | 20% | 63% | 37% | 26% |
| 5–7 Aug 2020 | Redfield and Wilton Strategies | N/A | 2,500 | 49% | 26% | 9% | 12% | 4% | 23% | 61% | 39% | 22% |

=== Before May 2020 ===
The polls below were taken when the election was expected in May 2020. Rory Stewart and Siobhan Benita both dropped out of the election following its delay.

| Date(s) conducted | Pollster | Client | Sample size | First preference | | | | | | | Final round | | | | | |
| Date(s) conducted | Pollster | Client | Sample size | Khan | Bailey | Berry | Benita | Stewart | Others | Lead | Khan | Bailey | Berry | Benita | Stewart | Lead |
| Date(s) conducted | Pollster | Client | Sample size | Lab | Con | Green | Lib Dem | Ind | Others | Lead | Lab | Con | Green | Lib Dem | Ind | Lead |
|---|---|---|---|---|---|---|---|---|---|---|---|---|---|---|---|---|
| 2–6 Mar 2020 | YouGov | Queen Mary University of London | 1,002 | 49% | 24% | 7% | 4% | 13% | 4% Reid (WEP): 1% Others: 3% | 25% | 67% | 33% | — | — | — | 34% |
| 2–6 Mar 2020 | YouGov | Queen Mary University of London | 1,002 | 49% | 24% | 7% | 4% | 13% | 4% Reid (WEP): 1% Others: 3% | 25% | 39% | — | 21% | — | — | 18% |
| 2–6 Mar 2020 | YouGov | Queen Mary University of London | 1,002 | 49% | 24% | 7% | 4% | 13% | 4% Reid (WEP): 1% Others: 3% | 25% | 41% | — | — | 18% | — | 23% |
| 2–6 Mar 2020 | YouGov | Queen Mary University of London | 1,002 | 49% | 24% | 7% | 4% | 13% | 4% Reid (WEP): 1% Others: 3% | 25% | 39% | — | — | — | 27% | 12% |
| 30 Oct – 4 Nov 2019 | YouGov | Queen Mary University of London | 1,175 | 45% | 23% | 7% | 8% | 13% | 4% | 22% | 44% | 25% | — | — | — | 19% |
| 30 Oct – 4 Nov 2019 | YouGov | Queen Mary University of London | 1,175 | 45% | 23% | 7% | 8% | 13% | 4% | 22% | 33% | — | 25% | — | — | 8% |
| 30 Oct – 4 Nov 2019 | YouGov | Queen Mary University of London | 1,175 | 45% | 23% | 7% | 8% | 13% | 4% | 22% | 35% | — | — | 22% | — | 13% |
| 30 Oct – 4 Nov 2019 | YouGov | Queen Mary University of London | 1,175 | 45% | 23% | 7% | 8% | 13% | 4% | 22% | 36% | — | — | — | 25% | 11% |
| 7–10 May 2019 | YouGov | Queen Mary University of London | 1,015 | 43% | 23% | 16% | 10% | — | 8% | 20% | 64% | 36% | — | — | — | 28% |
| 3–6 Dec 2018 | YouGov | Queen Mary University of London | 1,020 | 55% | 28% | 7% (Note: The poll question included Siân Berry as the Green Party candidate, even though she had not been selected at that time.) | 4% | — | 6% | 27% | 62% | 38% | — | — | — | 24% |

== Results ==
Per cent vote share by constituency.

Winning candidate by ward in the first round, not including postal votes

Results by borough

Counting of the votes started on Friday 7 May at 7 am. Due to measures taken to limit the spread of coronavirus, a result came on the evening of Saturday 8 May. Turnout at the election was 42%.

Mayor of London election 6 May 2021
| Party | Candidate | 1st round | | 2nd round | | | 1st round votesTransfer votes, 2nd round |
| Party | Candidate | Total | Of round | Transfers | Total | Of round | 1st round votesTransfer votes, 2nd round |
|---|---|---|---|---|---|---|---|
| Labour | Sadiq Khan | 1,013,721 | 40.0% | 192,313 | 1,206,034 | 55.2% | |
| Conservative | Shaun Bailey | 893,051 | 35.3% | 84,550 | 977,601 | 44.8% | |
| Green | Siân Berry | 197,976 | 7.8% | | | | |
| Liberal Democrats | Luisa Porritt | 111,716 | 4.4% | | | | |
| Independent | Niko Omilana | 49,628 | 2.0% | | | | |
| Reclaim | Laurence Fox | 47,634 | 1.9% | | | | |
| London Real | Brian Rose | 31,111 | 1.2% | | | | |
| Rejoin EU | Richard Hewison | 28,012 | 1.1% | | | | |
| Count Binface Party | Count Binface | 24,775 | 1.0% | | | | |
| Women's Equality | Mandu Reid | 21,182 | 0.8% | | | | |
| Let London Live | Piers Corbyn | 20,604 | 0.8% | | | | |
| Animal Welfare | Vanessa Hudson | 16,826 | 0.7% | | | | |
| UKIP | Peter Gammons | 14,393 | 0.6% | | | | |
| Independent | Farah London | 11,869 | 0.5% | | | | |
| Heritage | David Kurten | 11,025 | 0.4% | | | | |
| Independent | Nims Obunge | 9,682 | 0.4% | | | | |
| SDP | Steve Kelleher | 8,764 | 0.3% | | | | |
| Renew | Kam Balayev | 7,774 | 0.3% | | | | |
| Independent | Max Fosh | 6,309 | 0.2% | | | | |
| Burning Pink | Valerie Brown | 5,305 | 0.2% | | | | |
| Labour hold | | | | | | | |

=== Analysis and reactions ===
The result was closer than expected, with Bailey receiving a greater than expected share of the vote compared to polling and despite receiving few resources from Conservative Campaign HQ. Unlike incumbents in Greater Manchester, the West Midlands and Tees Valley, Khan saw his victory margin cut, and Bailey received the largest number of first preference votes in Ealing and Hillingdon, and Brent and Harrow, two constituencies where Khan won the most votes in the previous election.

Khan's first round vote share was down 4.2%, while Bailey's first round vote share was up 0.3% on the candidate in 2016. Berry's vote share was up 2.0%. The Liberal Democrats were down 0.2%. UKIP's vote share fell by 3%. The only other party that stood a candidate in 2016 and 2021 were the Women's Equality Party, who saw their vote share fall by 1.2%.

Two prominent YouTubers stood as candidates, both claiming that they successfully engaged young people in the election. Max Fosh came second to last and said he had no intention of standing as a candidate again, but Niko Omilana came fifth. Fosh told the BBC that he made about £4,500 from YouTube videos of his campaign, a net loss of £5500 taking into account his lost deposit, but that he also gained followers. Omilana did not answer the BBC's enquiries on this matter, but Hussein Kesvani estimated he would make back his lost deposit through increased YouTube revenues.

This was the Lib Dems' second-worst performance, only behind 2012. It also marked the third time in a row both that they had lost their deposit and had come fourth in London; this led the Green Party to suggest the Lib Dems are no longer London's third party, although the Liberal Democrats maintain far greater representation than the Green Party among MPs, councillors and controlled councils in London.

The election saw an unusually high number of spoiled votes – 4.3%, up from around 2% at previous elections. The majority of spoiled ballots were rejected for voting for too many candidates. This was attributed to the confusing ballot paper design – voters were told to vote once in each column for their first and second preferences, but the candidates were themselves arranged into two columns. The rate of spoiled ballots was highest in deprived areas where Labour is traditionally strongest, and Lewis Baston of OnLondon suggested that Khan's vote was disproportionately affected by the unusually high rejection rate. Khan's spokesman said he was "deeply concerned by the issues around the ballot paper and the effective disenfranchisement of 100,000 Londoners".

== See also ==
Other elections in the UK which were held on the same day:

- 2021 London Assembly election
- 2021 Scottish Parliament election
- 2021 Senedd election
- 2021 United Kingdom local elections
