= 2021 Oxfordshire County Council election =

Oxfordshire County Council election

← 2017	May 6, 2021	2025 →

All 63 seats to Oxfordshire County Council 32 seats needed for a majority
- Turnout: 40.4%

	First party	Second party	Third party
Party	Conservative	Liberal Democrats	Labour
Seats before	27	13	13
Seats won	21	21	16
Seat change	▼10	▲8	▲2
Popular vote	80,993	56,675	46,997
Percentage	36.9%	25.8%	21.4%
	Fourth party	Fifth party	Sixth party
Party	Green	Independent	Henley Residents
Seats before	1	8	1
Seats won	3	1	1
Seat change	▲3	▼3	Steady
Popular vote	26,302	5,238	2,295
Percentage	12.0%	2.4%	1.0%
- Map showing the results of the 2021 Oxfordshire County Council elections.
Council control before election
No Overall Control
Council control after election
No Overall Control

The 2021 Oxfordshire County Council election took place on 6 May 2021 alongside the other local elections. All 63 seats of the Oxfordshire County Council were contested. The council is composed of 61 divisions, each electing either one or two councillors, all elected by FPTP.

Since the last election in 2017, there had been some changes in seat composition. In April 2018, Cllr. Pete Handley was suspended from the Conservatives after calling another councillor a derogatory term. In November 2019, there was a by-election to replace the outgoing Independent councillor in Wallingford; Dr Pete Sudbury of the Green Party won the ensuing contest, providing the party representation after being wiped out at the last election. Three other Conservative councillors resigned the whip and became independents.

The elections took place at the same time as the Thames Valley Police and Crime Commissioner Election, which was due to have been held in 2020, but was delayed by the COVID-19 pandemic.

Although initial counts suggested the Conservatives were on 22 seats, and Labour on 15, there were errors in the Banbury Ruscote division where the Labour vote was mistaken for the Conservative vote and vice versa; this was successfully challenged in the High Court by Labour, and so the final result is 21 seats for the Conservatives and 16 for Labour.

== Summary ==
=== Election result ===
2021 Oxfordshire County Council election
Party	Candidates	Seats	Gains	Losses	Net gain/loss	Seats %	Votes %	Votes	+/−
Conservative	63	21	0	6	▼10	33.3	36.9	80,993	–4.4
Liberal Democrats	54	21	8	0	▲8	33.3	25.8	56,675	+1.3
Labour	62	16	3	0	▲2	25.4	21.4	46,997	–0.8
Green	41	3	2	0	▲3	4.8	12.0	26,302	+4.8
Independent	11	1	0	7	▼3	1.6	2.4	5,238	–1.0
Henley Residents	1	1	0	0	Steady	1.6	1.0	2,295	+0.2
Reform UK	4	0	0	0	Steady	0.0	0.2	449	N/A
Freedom Alliance (UK)	6	0	0	0	Steady	0.0	0.2	370	N/A
SDP	1	0	0	0	Steady	0.0	<0.1	74	N/A
For Britain	1	0	0	0	Steady	0.0	<0.1	63	N/A
Burning Pink	1	0	0	0	Steady	0.0	<0.1	34	N/A

== Aftermath ==
The Conservatives suffered big losses in the election, including the County Council leader Ian Hudspeth. The Liberal Democrats, Labour and Greens formed a coalition after the election, therefore ousting the Conservatives for the first time since the Council's formation in 1973.

Previously, from '01-'05 the Conservatives had governed in coalition with the Liberal Democrats, '05-'13 in a majority and since '13 working with independent councillors.

Initially, the newly minted leader of the Conservative group proposed a coalition with Labour alongside the one remaining independent councillor, Les Sibley, and Stefan Gawrysiak of the Henley Residents Group. Cllr. Reeves said: "If you look at two things: council tax and the approach to housing and growth, there is actually far more, if we are honest, in common between Labour and the Conservatives than between Lib Dems and Conservatives."

At the same time, talks continued between the Liberal Democrats and the Labour groups. While the Liberal Democrats also formed an alliance with the Green group to form a single group on the council, which will hold 24 councillors.

Eventually, later in May, it was revealed that the Liberal Democrat, Labour and Green councillors had formed an agreement, termed "The Oxfordshire Fair Deal Alliance" which would run the council in a coalition.

The new leader of the council will be Cllr. Liz Leffman (Lib Dem) while the deputy leader will be Cllr. Liz Brighouse (Labour). The cabinet will be split between four Liberal Democrats, three Labour and one Green councillor. The new Chair of the county council will be Cllr. John Howson (Lib Dem) with the Vice-Chair being Cllr. Susannah Pressel (Labour).

== Results by division ==
=== Cherwell ===
==== District summary ====
Cherwell district summary
Party	Seats	+/-	Votes	%	+/-
Conservative	9	▼2	20,777	48.4	–2.4
Labour	2	Steady	9,802	22.9	+0.2
Liberal Democrats	1	▲1	6,703	15.6	+2.9
Green	1	▲1	4,071	9.5	+3.9
Independent	1	Steady	1,468	3.4	–2.2
Reform UK	0	Steady	70	0.2	N/A
Total	14	Steady	42,891		

==== Division results ====
Banbury Calthorpe
Party	Candidate	Votes	%	±%
Conservative	Eddie Reeves *	1,316	48.0	−4.4
Labour	Sean Woodcock	887	32.4	−1.1
Green	Julia Middleton	366	13.4	+7.9
Liberal Democrats	Robert Pattenden	171	6.2	−2.4
Majority		429	15.7	
Turnout		2,740	37.0	
Conservative hold		Swing	▼2.8	

Banbury Grimsbury and Castle
Party	Candidate	Votes	%	±%
Labour	Hannah Banfield *	1,239	51.2	+3.1
Conservative	David Beverly	820	33.9	−2.0
Green	Aaron Bliss	217	9.0	+4.5
Liberal Democrats	David Yeomans	142	5.9	−0.6
Majority		419	17.3	
Turnout		2,418	28.9	
Labour hold		Swing	▲2.6	

Banbury Hardwick
Party	Candidate	Votes	%	±%
Conservative	Tony Ilott *	1,200	44.8	+1.6
Labour	Rebecca Biegel	1,089	40.7	−0.4
Green	Christopher Manley	206	7.7	+3.6
Liberal Democrats	James Hartley	112	4.2	−2.1
Reform UK	Stephen Hartley	70	2.6	N/A
Majority		111	4.1	
Turnout		2,677	30.6	
Conservative hold		Swing	▲1.0	

Banbury Ruscote
Party	Candidate	Votes	%	±%
Labour	Mark Cherry *	1,173	55.8	−2.5
Conservative	Jayne Strangwood	795	37.8	+9.8
Liberal Democrats	Steve Buckwell	133	6.3	+2.1
Majority		378	18.0	
Turnout		2,101	27.5	
Labour hold		Swing	▼6.2	

Bicester North
Party	Candidate	Votes	%	±%
Conservative	Donna Ford	1,339	52.95	−2.4
Labour	Sian Roscoe	508	20.09	−2.6
Green	Karl Kwiatkowski	349	13.80	N/A
Liberal Democrats	Simon Lytton	333	13.17	−2.0
Majority		831	32.86	
Turnout		2,529		
Conservative hold		Swing		

Bicester Town
Party	Candidate	Votes	%	±%
Conservative	Michael Waine *	1,399	54.93	−6.1
Green	Peter Maguire	653	25.64	+18.2
Labour	Gary Holder	495	19.43	−5.2
Majority		746	29.29	
Turnout		2,547		
Conservative hold		Swing		

Bicester West
Party	Candidate	Votes	%	±%
Independent	Les Sibley *	1,468	51.62	−11.2
Conservative	Sundeep Singh	706	24.82	+6.6
Labour	Celia Kavuma	430	15.12	+4.2
Liberal Democrats	Chris Pruden	240	8.44	+5.4
Majority		762	26.79	
Turnout		2,844		
Independent hold		Swing		

Bloxham and Easington
Party	Candidate	Votes	%	±%
Conservative	Kieron Mallon *	1,744	57.56	−3.2
Labour	Blue Watson	563	18.58	−1.9
Liberal Democrats	Nigel Davis	376	12.41	+4.1
Green	Fiona Mawson	347	11.45	+5.4
Majority		1,181	38.98	
Turnout		3,030		
Conservative hold		Swing		

Deddington
Party	Candidate	Votes	%	±%
Conservative	Arash Fatemian *	2,221	55.40	−2.9
Liberal Democrats	David Hingley	1,078	26.89	+14.7
Labour	Amanda Watkins	710	17.71	+3.9
Majority		1,143	28.51	
Turnout		4,009		
Conservative hold		Swing		

Kidlington South
Party	Candidate	Votes	%	±%
Green	Ian Middleton	1,570	47.94	+41.7
Conservative	Maurice Billington *	1,284	39.21	−17.3
Labour	Catharine Arakelian	421	12.85	−5.5
Majority		286	8.73	
Turnout		3,275		
Green gain from Conservative		Swing		

Kirtlington and Kidlington North
Party	Candidate	Votes	%	±%
Conservative	Nigel Simpson	1,909	47.05	−0.5
Liberal Democrats	Katherine Tyson	1,650	40.67	+3.0
Labour	Martin Stott	498	12.28	+8.3
Majority		259	6.38	
Turnout		4,057		
Conservative hold		Swing		

Otmoor
Party	Candidate	Votes	%	±%
Liberal Democrats	Calum Miller	1,673	46.11	+32.8
Conservative	Dan Sames *	1,554	42.83	−18.3
Labour	Jane Clements	401	11.05	−6.0
Majority		119	3.28	
Turnout		3,628		
Liberal Democrats gain from Conservative		Swing		

Ploughley
Party	Candidate	Votes	%	±%
Conservative	Ian Corkin *	1,991	65.32	+15.8
Labour	Joanne Howells	439	14.40	+5.5
Green	Fin MacEwan	363	11.91	+7.0
Liberal Democrats	Paul Wheatley	255	8.37	+0.1
Majority		1,552	50.92	
Turnout		3,048		
Conservative hold		Swing		

Wroxton and Hook Norton
Party	Candidate	Votes	%	±%
Conservative	George Reynolds *	2,499	62.66	−2.6
Labour	Anne Cullen	949	23.80	+8.8
Liberal Democrats	Julian Woodward	540	13.54	+0.3
Majority		1,550	38.87	
Turnout		3,988		
Conservative hold		Swing		

=== Oxford ===
==== District summary ====
Oxford district summary
Party	Seats	+/-	Votes	%	+/-
Labour	11	Steady	18,987	45.7	–0.2
Liberal Democrats	3	Steady	7,470	18.0	–5.1
Green	0	Steady	7,819	18.8	+4.2
Conservative	0	Steady	5,682	13.7	–1.0
Independent	0	Steady	1,460	3.5	+1.9
Freedom Alliance	0	Steady	88	0.2	N/A
For Britain	0	Steady	63	0.2	N/A
Total	14	Steady	41,569		

==== Division results ====
Barton, Sandhills and Risinghurst
Party	Candidate	Votes	%	±%
Labour	Glynis Phillips *	1,234	46.9	−1.7
Conservative	Chloe Dobbs	441	16.8	−2.5
Liberal Democrats	Andrew Heaver	401	15.2	+2.4
Green	Liz Taylor	306	11.63	+3.8
Independent	Chaka Artwell	248	9.43	−2.0
Majority		793	30.15	
Turnout		2,630		
Labour hold		Swing		

Churchill and Lye Valley
Party	Candidate	Votes	%	±%
Labour Co-op	Liz Brighouse *	1,521	61.4	−0.2
Conservative	Timothy Patmore	458	18.5	+1.4
Green	Matthew Elliott	319	12.9	+0.8
Liberal Democrats	Adam Povey	180	7.3	−1.8
Majority		1,063	42.9	
Turnout				
Labour Co-op hold		Swing		

Cowley
Party	Candidate	Votes	%	±%
Labour	Charles Hicks	1,903	54.3	+8.7
Green	Hazel Dawe	604	17.2	−6.8
Conservative	Johnson Kyeswa	372	10.6	−0.6
Independent	Dave Henwood	285	8.1	New
Independent	Judith Harley	217	6.2	−5.2
Liberal Democrats	Eleonore Vogel	121	3.5	−4.3
Majority		1,299	37.1	
Turnout				
Labour hold		Swing		

Headington and Quarry
Party	Candidate	Votes	%	±%
Liberal Democrats	Roz Smith *	1,784	45.5	−9.2
Labour	Trish Elphinstone	1,420	36.3	+5.9
Conservative	Ady Wright	419	11.3	+0.7
Green	Ray Hitchins	294	7.5	+3.2
Majority		364	9.2	
Turnout				
Liberal Democrats hold		Swing		

Iffley Fields and St Mary's
Party	Candidate	Votes	%	±%
Labour	Damian Haywood *	1,568	48.0	+1.5
Green	Chris Jarvis	1,373	42.1	+1.6
Conservative	Simon Bazley	175	5.4	−0.1
Liberal Democrats	Theodore Jupp	111	3.4	−3.4
Freedom Alliance	Francis O'Neill	38	1.2	New
Majority		195	5.9	
Turnout				
Labour hold		Swing		

Isis
Party	Candidate	Votes	%	±%
Labour	Brad Baines	1,671	53.3	−2.3
Green	Nuala Young	734	23.4	+11.1
Liberal Democrats	David Bowkett	372	11.9	−6.8
Conservative	Georgina Gibbs	343	10.9	−3.5
	Hakeem Yousaf	18	0.6	0.0
Majority		937	29.9	
Labour hold		Swing		

Jericho and Osney
Party	Candidate	Votes	%	±%
Labour	Susanna Pressel *	1,760	58.6	±0.0
Green	Sarah Edwards	583	19.4	+4.7
Liberal Democrats	Katherine Norman	382	12.7	−3.3
Conservative	William Hall	280	9.3	−0.2
Majority		1,177	39.2	
Turnout				
Labour hold		Swing		

Leys
Party	Candidate	Votes	%	±%
Labour	Imade Edosomwan	1,205	63.3	−8.5
Conservative	Paul Sims	355	18.6	+2.5
Green	David Newman	178	9.3	+3.7
Liberal Democrats	Paul Giesberg	104	5.5	−0.2
For Britain	Lorenzo de Gregori	63	3.3	New
Majority		850	44.7	
Labour hold		Swing		

Marston and Northway
Party	Candidate	Votes	%	±%
Labour	Mark Lygo *	1,430	42.9	−4.2
Green	Alistair Morris	899	27.0	+16.7
Conservative	Mark Bhagwandin	707	21.2	−3.1
Liberal Democrats	Joanna Steele	245	7.4	−9.2
Freedom Alliance	Mark Boulle	50	1.5	New
Majority		531	15.9	
Labour hold		Swing		

Rose Hill and Littlemore
Party	Candidate	Votes	%	±%
Labour	Michele Paule	1,537	52.3	−7.6
Conservative	Daniel Stafford	516	17.6	−2.0
Green	Kevin McGlynn	385	13.1	+4.8
Independent	Michael Evans	341	11.6	New
Liberal Democrats	Christopher Smowton	158	5.4	−5.6
Majority		1,021	34.7	
Labour hold		Swing		

St Clement's and Cowley Marsh
Party	Candidate	Votes	%	±%
Labour	Mohamed Fadlalla	1,002	42.6	−7.5
Green	Rosie Rawle	640	27.2	−3.9
Independent	Jamila Azad *	351	14.9	−35.2
Liberal Democrats	Andrew Steele	179	7.6	−3.0
Conservative	Fay Sims	178	7.6	±0.0
Majority		362	15.4	
Labour hold		Swing		

St Margaret's
Party	Candidate	Votes	%	±%
Liberal Democrats	John Howson *	1,312	36.5	−4.7
Labour	Christopher Hull	1,220	33.9	−4.4
Conservative	Penelope Lenon	565	15.7	+0.4
Green	Christopher Goodall	497	13.8	+8.8
Majority		92	2.6	
Liberal Democrats hold		Swing		

University Parks
Party	Candidate	Votes	%	±%
Labour	Michael O'Connor	728	45.5	+3.7
Green	Dianne Regisford	459	28.7	+7.4
Liberal Democrats	James Cox	269	16.8	−7.4
Conservative	Maddy Ross	145	9.1	−2.9
Majority		269	16.8	
Labour hold		Swing		

Wolvercote and Summertown
Party	Candidate	Votes	%	±%
Liberal Democrats	Andrew Gant	1,853	50.2	−3.0
Labour	Andrew Siantonas	688	18.6	+3.3
Conservative	Katherine Kettle	604	16.4	−6.0
Green	Sheila Cameron	548	14.8	+5.8
Majority		1165	31.5	+0.7
Liberal Democrats hold		Swing		

=== South Oxfordshire ===
==== District summary ====
South Oxfordshire district summary
Party	Seats	+/-	Votes	%	+/-
Conservative	6	▼2	20,318	39.7	–7.0
Liberal Democrats	4	▲3	11,939	23.3	+1.4
Green	2	▲1	7,803	15.3	+9.8
Henley Residents	1	Steady	2,295	4.5	+0.5
Labour	0	Steady	6,880	13.4	+0.1
Independent	0	▼2	1,777	3.5	N/A
SDP	0	Steady	74	0.1	N/A
Freedom Alliance	0	Steady	71	0.1	N/A
Total	13	Steady	51,157		

==== Division results ====
Benson and Cholsey
Party	Candidate	Votes	%	±%
Conservative	Felix Bloomfield	1,519	41.4	+8.9
Liberal Democrats	Katharine Keats-Rohan	1,499	40.9	+32.5
Labour	Sean Hannigan	577	15.7	+6.2
SDP	Maryse Pomlett	74	2.0	New
Majority		20		
Conservative gain from Independent		Swing	N/A	

Berinsfield and Garsington
Party	Candidate	Votes	%	±%
Green	Robin Bennett	1,915	56.6	+37.8
Conservative	Lorraine Lindsay-Gale *	1,205	35.6	−19.0
Labour	Crispin Flintoff	262	7.7	−4.3
Majority		710	21.0	
Green gain from Conservative		Swing		

Chalgrove and Watlington
Party	Candidate	Votes	%	±%
Liberal Democrats	Freddie Van Mierlo	2,174	53.5	+18.4
Conservative	Steve Harrod *	1,611	39.6	−14.4
Labour	Jake Brown	282	6.9	+0.4
Majority		563	13.9	
Liberal Democrats gain from Conservative		Swing		

Didcot East and Hagbourne
Party	Candidate	Votes	%	±%
Conservative	Jane Murphy	1,243	45.3	−2.5
Labour	Mocky Khan	877	32.0	+3.9
Liberal Democrats	Gautam Chandran	338	12.3	−11.8
Green	Sarah Sharp	285	10.4	New
Majority		366	13.3	
Conservative hold		Swing		

Didcot Ladygrove
Party	Candidate	Votes	%	±%
Liberal Democrats	David Rouane	845	40.3	+19.2
Conservative	Alan Thompson	802	38.2	+14.9
Labour	Nick Hards	452	21.5	+12.4
Majority		43	2.1	
Liberal Democrats gain from Independent		Swing		

Didcot West
Party	Candidate	Votes	%	±%
Conservative	Ian Snowdon	1,812	48.8	+6.4
Labour	Denise MacDonald	1,402	37.8	+1.2
Liberal Democrats	Olly Glover	498	13.4	−2.8
Majority		410	11.0	
Conservative hold		Swing		

Goring
Party	Candidate	Votes	%	±%
Conservative	Kevin Bulmer *	1,773	44.3	−13.8
Liberal Democrats	Bryan Urbick	1,653	41.3	+23.1
Labour	Judi Green	575	14.4	+2.5
Majority		120	3.0	
Conservative hold		Swing		

Henley-on-Thames
Party	Candidate	Votes	%	±%
Henley Residents	Stefan Gawrysiak *	2,295	62.3	+14.5
Conservative	Bruce Harrison	949	25.8	−11.4
Labour	Stephen Herbert	328	8.9	+4.4
Freedom Alliance	Vivienne Lee	110	3.0	New
Majority		1,346	36.5	
Henley Residents hold		Swing		

Sonning Common
Party	Candidate	Votes	%	±%
Conservative	David Bartholomew *	1,938	58.6	−12.0
Green	Jo Robb	1,010	30.6	New
Labour	Dominic Fawcett	286	8.7	−4.6
Freedom Alliance	Marie Mason	71	2.1	New
Majority				
Conservative hold		Swing		

Thame and Chinnor
Party	Candidate	Votes	%	±%
Conservative	Nigel Champken-Woods	2,836	39.2	−13.6
Liberal Democrats	Kate Gregory	2,781	38.5	+9.8
Green	Morgan James	2,482	34.3	+27.3
Conservative	Harvey Bell	2,359	32.6	−17.1
Independent	Jeannette Matelot *	1,667	23.1	−26.6
Labour	Paul Swan	721	10.0	−3.4
Labour	Tom Nolan	515	7.1	−3.6
Majority		299	4.2	
Conservative hold		Swing		
Liberal Democrats gain from Conservative		Swing		

Wallingford
Party	Candidate	Votes	%	±%
Green	Pete Sudbury *	2,111	58.9	+18.9
Conservative	Lee Upcraft	1,183	33.0	−2
Labour	George Ryall	290	8.1	−0.1
Majority		928	25.9	
Green hold		Swing	+	

Wheatley
Party	Candidate	Votes	%	±%
Liberal Democrats	Tim Bearder	2,151	60.6	+15.6
Conservative	Fiona Ardern	1,088	30.6	−12.3
Labour	Phil Bloomer	313	8.8	−3.1
Majority		1,063	30.0	
Liberal Democrats hold		Swing		

=== Vale of White Horse ===
==== District summary ====
Vale of White Horse district summary
Party	Seats	+/-	Votes	%	+/-
Liberal Democrats	10	▲2	22,288	46.4	+4.6
Conservative	2	▼2	17,777	37.0	–6.2
Labour	0	Steady	4,375	9.1	–0.6
Green	0	Steady	3,174	6.6	+1.3
Independent	0	Steady	147	0.3	N/A
Reform UK	0	Steady	127	0.3	N/A
Freedom Alliance	0	Steady	101	0.2	N/A
Total	12	Steady	47,989		

==== Division results ====
Abingdon East
Party	Candidate	Votes	%	±%
Liberal Democrats	Alison Rooke *	1,604	51.0	−2.1
Conservative	David Pope	961	30.6	−3.8
Green	Cheryl Briggs	281	8.9	+3.3
Labour	Edward Shelton	250	8.0	+1.0
Freedom Alliance	Jill Kirkwood	47	1.5	New
Majority		643	20.4	
Liberal Democrats hold		Swing		

Abingdon North
Party	Candidate	Votes	%	±%
Liberal Democrats	Nathan Ley	1,978	51.2	+4.9
Conservative	Charlotte Njeru	1,234	31.9	−6.9
Labour	Norma Queralt	323	8.4	−1.1
Green	Michel Grandjean	276	7.1	+1.6
Freedom Alliance	Geoff Sandford	54	1.4	New
Majority		744	19.3	
Liberal Democrats hold		Swing		

Abingdon South
Party	Candidate	Votes	%	±%
Liberal Democrats	Neil Fawcett *	1,769	52.9	+6.6
Conservative	Christopher Palmer	1,146	34.3	−4.5
Labour	Arjun Bais	303	9.1	−0.5
Reform UK	Eladia Posthill	127	3.8	New
Majority		623	18.6	
Liberal Democrats hold		Swing		

Faringdon
Party	Candidate	Votes	%	±%
Liberal Democrats	Bethia Thomas	1,761	55.5	+16.6
Conservative	David Leigh-Pemberton	1,129	35.6	−16.2
Labour	Rachel Williams	282	8.9	−0.4
Turnout		3,172	42	+14
Majority		632	19.9	
Liberal Democrats gain from Conservative		Swing		

Grove and Wantage
Party	Candidate	Votes	%	±%
Liberal Democrats	Jenny Hannaby *	3,062	51.3	+4.5
Liberal Democrats	Jane Hanna OBE *	2,728	45.7	+3.8
Conservative	Louise Brown	1,941	32.5	−5.6
Conservative	Ben Mabbett	1,926	32.2	−1.7
Green	Kerstin Fischer-Johnston	588	9.8	+1.3
Labour	Louis Hall	534	8.9	−5.6
Labour	Charlotte Cowen	520	8.7	+6.2
Majority		787	13.2	
Liberal Democrats hold		Swing		
Liberal Democrats hold		Swing		

Hendreds and Harwell
Party	Candidate	Votes	%	±%
Liberal Democrats	Sally Povolotsky	1,964	46.4	+28.0
Conservative	Amos Lundie	1,792	42.3	−12.3
Labour	Pamela Siggers	476	11.2	−6.2
Majority		172	4.1	
Liberal Democrats gain from Conservative		Swing		

Kennington and Radley
Party	Candidate	Votes	%	±%
Liberal Democrats	Bob Johnston *	1,892	53.4	+1.5
Conservative	Ed Blagrove	1,215	34.3	−1.9
Green	Tom Gaston	247	7.0	+1.4
Labour	Nekisa Gholami-Babaahmady	188	5.3	−1.3
Majority		677	19.1	
Liberal Democrats hold		Swing		

Kingston and Cumnor
Party	Candidate	Votes	%	±%
Conservative	Juliette Ash	2,189	50.3	−7.1
Liberal Democrats	Paul Barrow	1,766	40.6	+16.6
Labour	Maurice O'Donoghue	395	9.1	−1.9
Majority		423	9.7	
Conservative hold		Swing		

North Hinksey
Party	Candidate	Votes	%	±%
Liberal Democrats	Judy Roberts *	2,008	54.1	+1.3
Conservative	Jenny Jackson	861	23.2	−8.4
Labour	Jamie Spooner	405	10.9	+1.3
Green	Katherine Phillips	292	7.9	+2.0
Independent	Antony Houghton	147	4.0	New
Majority				
Liberal Democrats hold		Swing		

Shrivenham
Party	Candidate	Votes	%	±%
Conservative	Yvonne Constance *	1,944	52.2	−12.4
Green	Katherine Foxhall	1,490	40.0	+33.2
Labour	Evelyne Godfrey	290	7.8	−7.4
Majority		454	12.2	
Conservative hold		Swing		

Sutton Courtenay and Marcham
Party	Candidate	Votes	%	±%
Liberal Democrats	Richard Webber *	1,756	48.7	+3.7
Conservative	James Plumb	1,439	39.9	−3.9
Labour	Stuart Jarvis	409	11.3	+3.3
Majority		317		
Liberal Democrats hold		Swing		

=== West Oxfordshire ===
==== District summary ====
West Oxfordshire district summary
Party	Seats	+/-	Votes	%	+/-
Conservative	4	▼4	16,144	45.3	–5.3
Liberal Democrats	3	▲2	8,296	23.3	–2.0
Labour	3	▲2	7,053	19.8	+1.1
Green	0	Steady	3,340	9.4	+4.5
Independent	0	Steady	496	1.4	N/A
Reform UK	0	Steady	282	0.8	N/A
Burning Pink	0	Steady	35	0.1	N/A
Total	10	Steady	35,646		

==== Division results ====
Burford and Carterton North
Party	Candidate	Votes	%	±%
Conservative	Nick Field-Johnson *	1,404	63.0	−3.8
Green	Rosie Pearson	488	21.9	+15.7
Liberal Democrats	David Melvin	338	15.2	
Majority		916	41.1	
Conservative hold		Swing		

Carterton South and West
Party	Candidate	Votes	%	±%
Conservative	Nick Leverton	1,558	59.9	−9.6
Independent	Pete Handley *	425	16.3	−53.2
Labour	Sian O'Neill	265	10.2	−1.7
Liberal Democrats	David Michael Cole	182	7.0	−2.0
Green	Hemashu Kotecha	170	6.5	+0.8
Majority		1,133	43.6	
Conservative hold		Swing		

Charlbury and Wychwood
Party	Candidate	Votes	%	±%
Liberal Democrats	Liz Leffman *	1,900	47.3	−5.0
Conservative	Jenny Evanson	1,490	37.1	−2.1
Labour	Sue Richards	328	8.2	+3.0
Green	Frances Mortimer	299	7.4	+4.1
Rejected ballots		43		
Majority		410	10.2	
Liberal Democrats hold		Swing		

Chipping Norton
Party	Candidate	Votes	%	±%
Labour Co-op	Geoff Saul	1,528	42.6	+8.5
Conservative	Maz Holland	1,468	40.9	−4.3
Green	Malcolm Brown	390	10.9	+8.2
Liberal Democrats	Ivan Aguado Melet	201	5.6	−10.6
Rejected ballots		55		
Turnout		3,587	41	−3
Majority		60	1.7	
Labour Co-op gain from Conservative		Swing		

Eynsham
Party	Candidate	Votes	%	±%
Liberal Democrats	Dan Levy	2,115	49.7	+7.8
Conservative	Sean Grace	1,808	42.5	−1.8
Labour	Max Bell	331	7.8	−1.2
Majority		307	7.2	
Liberal Democrats gain from Conservative		Swing		

Hanborough and Minster Lovell
Party	Candidate	Votes	%	±%
Conservative	Liam Walker *	2,059	52.0	+0.3
Liberal Democrats	Lidia Arciszewska	1,035	26.1	+5.4
Green	Angela Wilson	428	10.8	+6.3
Labour	Judith Wardle	405	10.2	−12.9
Burning Pink	Dave Baldwin	35	0.9	New
Majority		1,024	25.9	
Conservative hold		Swing		

Witney North and East
Party	Candidate	Votes	%	±%
Labour Co-op	Duncan Enright	1,606	40.1	+14.3
Conservative	Dean Temple	1,216	30.4	−22.6
Green	Andrew Prosser	943	23.5	+15.8
Reform UK	Richard Langridge	240	6.0	New
Majority		390	9.7	
Labour Co-op gain from Conservative		Swing		

Witney South and Central
Party	Candidate	Votes	%	±%
Labour	Andrew Coles	1,415	43.3	−2.3
Conservative	Ben Woodruff	1,297	39.7	−1.7
Green	Harriet Kopinska	235	7.2	+2.7
Liberal Democrats	Andy Bailey	206	6.3	−2.3
Independent	Adrian Henry-Wyatt	71	2.2	New
Reform UK	Mark Bezerra Speeks	42	1.3	New
Majority		118	3.6	
Labour hold		Swing		

Witney West and Bampton
Party	Candidate	Votes	%	±%
Conservative	Ted Fenton *	2,042	57.7	−5.0
Labour	Stuart McCarroll	758	21.4	+8.0
Green	Sandra Simpson	387	10.9	+4.9
Liberal Democrats	Peter Whitten	349	9.9	−7.9
Majority		1,284	36.3	
Conservative hold		Swing		

Woodstock
Party	Candidate	Votes	%	±%
Liberal Democrats	Andy Graham	1,970	47.0	+9.0
Conservative	Ian Hudspeth *	1,802	43.0	−4.7
Labour	Mark Lambert	417	10.0	+0.9
Majority		168	4.0	
Liberal Democrats gain from Conservative		Swing		

== Changes 2021–2025 ==
=== Affiliation changes ===
- Hannah Banfield, elected for Labour, left the party in November 2022 to sit as an independent.
- Damian Haywood, elected for Labour, left the party in September 2023 to sit as an independent.
- Sally Povolotsky, elected for the Liberal Democrats, left the party in December 2023 to sit as an independent.
- Felix Bloomfield and Kevin Bulmer, both elected for the Conservatives, joined Reform UK in March 2025.

=== By-elections ===
==== Rose Hill and Littlemore ====
Rose Hill and Littlemore: 2 March 2023
Party	Candidate	Votes	%	±%
Labour	Trish Elphinstone	1,169	43.9	
Independent	Michael Evans	1,046	39.3	
Conservative	Timothy Patmore	227	8.5	
Green	David Thomas	120	4.5	
Liberal Democrats	Theo Jupp	75	2.8	
TUSC	Callum Joyce	23	0.9	
Majority		123	4.6	
Turnout		2,660	33.9	
Registered electors		7,838		
Labour hold		Swing		

By-election triggered by the resignation of Labour councillor Michele Paule.

==== Sutton Courtenay & Marcham ====
Sutton Courtenay & Marcham: 20 June 2024
Party	Candidate	Votes	%	±%
Liberal Democrats	Peter Stevens	702	36.6	–12.1
Conservative	James Plumb	656	34.2	–5.7
Green	Aidan Reilly	375	19.6	N/A
Labour	Jim Broadbent	183	9.6	–1.7
Majority		46	2.4	
Turnout		1,926	20.0	
Registered electors		9,639		
Liberal Democrats hold		Swing	▼3.2	
