= 2021 West Oxfordshire District Council election =

2021 UK local government election

Map showing the results of the 2021 West Oxfordshire District Council election

The 2021 West Oxfordshire District Council election took place on 6 May 2021 to elect members of West Oxfordshire District Council in Oxfordshire, England. One third of the council was up for election and the Conservative Party stayed in overall control of the council, although with a reduced majority.

== Results summary ==
2021 West Oxfordshire District Council election
Party	This election			Full council			This election		
Party	Seats	Net	Seats %	Other	Total	Total %	Votes	Votes %	+/−
Conservative	10	▼3	55.6	18	28	57.1	12,004	42.1	+3.0
Liberal Democrats	4	▲2	22.2	6	10	20.4	6,851	24.0	-0.3
Labour	3	Steady	16.7	5	8	20.4	6,328	22.2	-0.8
Independent	0	Steady	0.0	2	2	4.1	143	0.5	-3.5
Green	1	▲1	5.6	0	1	2.0	3,132	11.0	+2.0
Reform UK	0	Steady	0.0	0	0	0.0	27	0.1	New
Burning Pink	0	Steady	0.0	0	0	0.0	15	0.1	New

== Ward results ==
=== Bampton and Clanfield ===
Bampton and Clanfield (by-election)
Party	Candidate	Votes	%	±%
Conservative	Rupert Dent	803	64.4	+1.7
Green	Alma Tumilowicz	242	19.4	N/A
Labour	Sarah Hayton	202	16.2	+5.4
Majority		561	45.0	+8.7
Turnout		1,256	38.7	+4.1
Conservative hold		Swing	▼8.9	

=== Chadlington and Churchill ===
Chadlington and Churchill
Party	Candidate	Votes	%	±%
Conservative	Dean Temple	328	45.2	−20.5
Liberal Democrats	Nigel Ridpath	235	32.4	+21.5
Green	James Styring	101	13.9	+0.8
Labour Co-op	David Heyes	61	8.4	−1.9
Majority		93	12.8	
Turnout		744	45.0	+3.8
Conservative hold		Swing	▼21.0	

=== Charlbury and Finstock ===
Charlbury and Finstock
Party	Candidate	Votes	%	±%
Liberal Democrats	Liz Leffman	884	54.6	+9.0
Conservative	Caspar Morris	407	25.2	−5.3
Green	Liz Reason	205	12.7	−3.1
Labour Co-op	Sue Richards	122	7.5	−0.6
Majority		477	29.4	+14.3
Turnout		1,645	53.5	+5.3
Liberal Democrats hold		Swing	▼7.0	

=== Chipping Norton ===
Chipping Norton
Party	Candidate	Votes	%	±%
Labour Co-op	Geoff Saul	1,201	54.8	+14.3
Conservative	Ruth Obasa	616	28.1	−5.3
Green	Malcolm Brown	263	12.0	N/A
Liberal Democrats	Ivan Aguado Melet	113	5.2	−21.0
Majority		585	26.7	+19.6
Turnout		2,264	40.5	+2.6
Labour Co-op hold		Swing	▲9.8	

=== Eynsham and Cassington ===
Eynsham and Cassington
Party	Candidate	Votes	%	±%
Liberal Democrats	Andrew Goodwin	1,391	55.4	+2.4
Conservative	Sean Grace	783	31.2	+7.9
Labour	Elsa Dawson	191	7.6	−0.2
Green	Ed Rolison	145	5.8	−10.0
Majority		608	24.2	−5.5
Turnout		2,522	50.4	+10.7
Liberal Democrats gain from Conservative		Swing	▼2.8	

=== Freeland and Hanborough ===
Freeland and Hanborough
Party	Candidate	Votes	%	±%
Conservative	Alaa Al-Yousuf	893	51.7	+14.6
Liberal Democrats	Lidia Arciszewska	482	27.9	+20.4
Labour	Tommy Begley	182	10.5	−35.1
Green	Angela Wilson	154	6.9	+1.3
Burning Pink	Dave Baldwin	15	0.9	N/A
Majority		411	23.8	—
Turnout		1,740	45.2	−2.5
Conservative hold		Swing	▼5.8	

=== Hailey, Minster Lovell and Leafield ===
Hailey, Minster Lovell and Leafield
Party	Candidate	Votes	%	±%
Conservative	Colin Dingwall	801	55.1	+9.1
Liberal Democrats	Paul Marsh	653	44.9	+12.3
Majority		148	10.2	−3.2
Turnout		1,467	44.1	+4.9
Conservative hold		Swing	▼1.6	

=== Kingham, Rollright and Enstone ===
Kingham, Rollright and Enstone
Party	Candidate	Votes	%	±%
Conservative	Alex Wilson	725	54.3	+1.4
Labour	Andrew Hornung	324	24.3	+10.9
Green	Amy Long	163	12.2	−5.4
Liberal Democrats	Mike Baggaley	124	9.3	−6.8
Majority		401	30.0	−5.3
Turnout		1,362	41.6	+7.6
Conservative hold		Swing	▼4.8	

=== Milton-under-Wychwood ===
Milton-under-Wychwood
Party	Candidate	Votes	%	±%
Conservative	Jeff Haine	464	58.1	−10.2
Liberal Democrats	Sophie Kitching	173	21.7	+6.5
Labour Co-op	Sian O'Neill	87	10.9	+1.3
Green	Tim Eden	75	9.4	+2.5
Majority		291	36.4	
Turnout		807	45.2	+3.5
Conservative hold		Swing	▼8.4	

=== North Leigh ===
North Leigh
Party	Candidate	Votes	%	±%
Conservative	Harry St John	460	59.3	−4.9
Labour	Maureen Eades	119	15.3	−6.0
Liberal Democrats	Gillian Workman	112	14.4	+10.2
Green	Julia Shay	85	11.0	+0.7
Majority		341	44.0	
Turnout		786	44.6	+0.8
Conservative hold		Swing	▲0.6	

=== Standlake, Aston and Stanton ===
Standlake, Aston and Stanton
Party	Candidate	Votes	%	±%
Conservative	Lysette Nicholls	983	56.3	+0.1
Liberal Democrats	Marcus Luckett	596	34.1	+23.9
Labour	Mike Parker	167	9.6	−1.6
Majority		387	22.2	
Turnout		1,769	49.2	+13.2
Conservative hold		Swing	▼11.9	

=== Stonesfield and Tackley ===
Stonesfield and Tackley
Party	Candidate	Votes	%	±%
Liberal Democrats	Mathew Parkinson	693	40.0	−5.7
Conservative	Richard Jackson	668	38.6	+4.4
Green	Frances Mortimer	232	13.4	+0.6
Labour	Nell Davies-Small	138	8.0	+0.7
Majority		25	1.4	−10.1
Turnout		1,751	50.0	+5.7
Liberal Democrats gain from Conservative		Swing	▼5.1	

=== Witney Central ===
Witney Central
Party	Candidate	Votes	%	±%
Labour	Andrew Coles	810	52.9	+5.6
Conservative	Craig Brown	526	34.3	−1.2
Green	Harriet Kopinska	100	6.5	−3.3
Liberal Democrats	Andy Bailey	69	4.5	−2.9
Reform UK	Mark Bezerra Speeks	27	1.8	N/A
Majority		284	18.6	+6.8
Turnout		1,540	36.2	+2.8
Labour hold		Swing	▲3.4	

=== Witney East ===
Witney East
Party	Candidate	Votes	%	±%
Labour Co-op	Duncan Enright	1,167	47.8	−2.7
Conservative	Rich Hikins	862	35.3	−0.2
Green	Sandra Simpson	294	12.0	N/A
Liberal Democrats	Christopher Blount	117	4.8	−9.2
Majority		305	12.5	−2.5
Turnout		2,473	42.9	+7.0
Labour Co-op hold		Swing	▼1.3	

=== Witney North ===
Witney North
Party	Candidate	Votes	%	±%
Green	Andrew Prosser	648	41.7	+28.7
Conservative	Toby Morris	487	31.3	+7.8
Labour Co-op	Ruth Smith	351	22.6	+1.3
Independent	Pete Handley	68	4.4	N/A
Majority		161	10.4	—
Turnout		1,562	50.2	+8.9
Green gain from Conservative		Swing	▲10.5	

=== Witney South ===
Witney South
Party	Candidate	Votes	%	±%
Conservative	Mark Johnson	828	45.0	+7.5
Labour	Michael Brooker	638	34.7	−6.1
Green	Carol Cather	164	8.9	−5.7
Liberal Democrats	Kate Southey	136	7.4	+0.3
Independent	Adrian Henry-Wyatt	75	4.1	N/A
Majority		190	10.3	—
Turnout		1,885	38.0	+5.0
Conservative hold		Swing	▲6.8	

=== Witney West ===
Witney West
Party	Candidate	Votes	%	±%
Conservative	Jane Doughty	753	52.5	+6.3
Labour Co-op	Stuart McCarroll	427	29.8	+11.7
Liberal Democrats	Peter Whitten	154	10.7	−16.3
Green	Penny Ponton	101	7.0	−1.8
Majority		326	22.7	+3.5
Turnout		1,462	35.4	+1.0
Conservative hold		Swing	▼2.7	

=== Woodstock and Bladon ===
Woodstock and Bladon
Party	Candidate	Votes	%	±%
Liberal Democrats	Elizabeth Poskitt	919	50.0	+8.0
Conservative	Jo Lamb	617	33.6	+5.6
Green	Barry Wheatley	160	8.7	−1.9
Labour	Mark Lambert	141	7.7	−1.0
Majority		302	16.4	
Turnout		1,865	53.4	+9.6
Liberal Democrats hold		Swing	▲1.2	
