= Burning Pink =

British environmental pressure group

- Founder: Roger Hallam; Valerie Brown; Ramon Salgado-Touzon; Benedict McGorty
- Founded: June 2020
- Dissolved: 2022
- Split from: Extinction Rebellion
- Succeeded by: Just Stop Oil
- Ideology: Sortition; Environmentalism
- Colours: Pink

Website
- burningpink.earth

Burning Pink, also known as Beyond Politics and formally registered with the Electoral Commission as The Burning Pink Party, was a British political party with the stated goal of a political revolution by replacing the British government with citizens' assemblies in order to tackle the climate crisis and other political issues. The party was deregistered by the Electoral Commission on 11 November 2022.

== History ==
The party launched in June 2020 with a shoplifting stunt in which members of the party walked out of a Sainsbury's supermarket branch in Camden Town, London with shopping trolleys full of food without paying.

On 25 July 2020, a number of the party members occupied a road around Trafalgar Square in London, holding a banner saying “bring down the government.”

In August, several members of the party were arrested for dousing the party headquarters of the Conservatives, Labour, the Lib Dems and the Green Party in pink paint over their inaction to tackle the climate crisis.

Later that month, five members of the party including Roger Hallam were arrested at their homes for conspiracy to cause criminal damage. They were placed on remand until the end of a planned period of disruption by multiple environmental groups, including Extinction Rebellion. All five members went on immediate hunger strike in protest at their imprisonment.

In January 2021, the group demanded that local councils honour their climate emergency declaration to act on the ecological collapse and social breakdown, or they would begin a nationwide campaign of nonviolent civil disobedience. In their 12 demands, Burning Pink called upon local councils to declare open rebellion against the government. On 15 February, local Burning Pink groups threw pink paint on buildings used by Norwich City Council and Norfolk County Council, Ipswich Borough Council, Bristol City Hall and Brighton Town Hall, resulting in at least six arrests.

Later that year, Burning Pink fought arguably their most prominent conventional political campaign when teacher Valerie Brown stood for the party in the 2021 London Mayoral election. Brown was accused of criminal damage after spraying pink paint on offices of The Guardian newspaper. Brown was previously arrested and charged with criminal damage of windows at HSBC's headquarters on 22 April. She garnered 5,305 votes.

The party folded in 2022. Many of its leading members—including Hallam, Brown and Sarah Lunnon—became supporters of Just Stop Oil, a group similar to Burning Pink in both objectives and strategy.

== Party status and name ==
The party's constitution states "The Party will be registered in Great Britain (excluding Northern Ireland)."

The party's application for registration in the Electoral Commission's register of political parties, to register the name "The Burning Pink Party", to apply to "All of Great Britain", was approved on 7 October 2020.

Beyond Politics Ltd is a company registered at Companies House (no. 12659497), incorporated on 10 June 2020; the party's website says "Burning Pink is a name we trade under to represent Beyond Politics Party Ltd".

== Elections contested ==
Valerie Brown stood as Burning Pink's candidate for the 2021 London mayoral election. Brown launched her campaign on 13 November 2020. Brown finished in 20th place out of 20 candidates, achieving 5,305 votes (0.2%). Rachel Lunnon stood as the party's candidate in the ward of Windmill Hill, Bristol, achieving 90 votes (0.9%). Sue Hagley and Jennifer McCarthy stood as the candidates for the wards of St Margaret's and Westgate respectively in the 2021 Ipswich Borough Council election. Dave Baldwin stood for Oxfordshire County Council for the Hanborough and Minster Lovell Division, and Tina Smith stood for Suffolk County Council for the St Margaret's and Westgate Division.

Date of election	Constituency	Candidate	Votes	%	Position
2021 London mayoral election	London-wide	Valerie Brown	5,305	0.2%	20th (last)
2021 Bristol City Council election	Windmill Hill	Rachel Lunnon	90	1.7%	9th (last)
2021 Ipswich Borough Council election	St Margaret's	Sue Hagley	78	1.2%	5th (last)
2021 Oxfordshire County Council election	Hanborough and Minster Lovell	Dave Baldwin	34	0.9%	5th (last)
2021 Suffolk County Council election	St Margaret's and Westgate	Tina Smith	168	2.1%	7th (last)
2021 West Oxfordshire District Council election	Freeland and Hanborough	Dave Baldwin	15	0.9%	5th (last)
