= Civil Service Live =

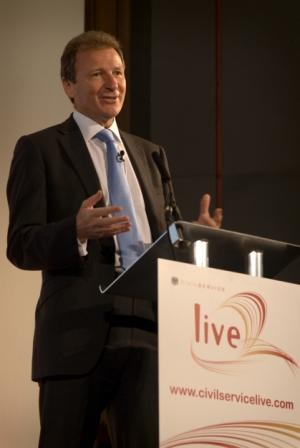
Gus O'Donnell speaking at Civil Service Live

Civil Service Live is a series of events in the United Kingdom designed to share best practice, promote innovation and drive collaboration across all government departments and agencies across the Civil Service.

== Overview ==
It was launched by the Cabinet Secretary Sir Gus O'Donnell and Kevin Sorkin at Civil Service World in April 2008.

The national event has featured high-profile speakers (including Peter Jones from Dragons Den), workshops, an innovation space, a civil service history museum and other exciting content.

In addition to the national event in London, Civil Service Live stages a number of regional events across the country, the first of these was Gateshead in 2009 and events have also taken place in Manchester and Belfast.

The London venue moved to London Olympia in 2010, swiftly followed the general election and provided a platform for the prime minister, deputy prime minister and many other secretaries of state to address their departmental senior management teams. The move to Olympia was not popular with civil servants, who complained the venue was difficult to get to and not pleasant to be at. The venue moved back to central London in the mid-2010s.

To go alongside the site, the Civil Service Live Network has been set up and now has over 30,000 users. It provides networking tools and news from Civil Service World for members of the civil service community and wider public sector. The Civil Service Live Network has since been discontinued by Dods.

In 2018, Civil Service Live will take place in Glasgow on 7 June, Birmingham on 13 June, Blackpool on 27 June, Cardiff on 5 July, Newcastle on 12 July and in London on 17 and 18 July. The website for the event is www.civilservicelive.com.

Civil Service Live is part of the Cabinet Office and Dods programme of events that include the Civil Service Awards and the Civil Service Diversity and Equality Awards.
