= 2012 London mayoral election =

London mayoral election

- 3 May 2012
- Opinion polls
- Turnout: 38.1% ▼7.2 pp
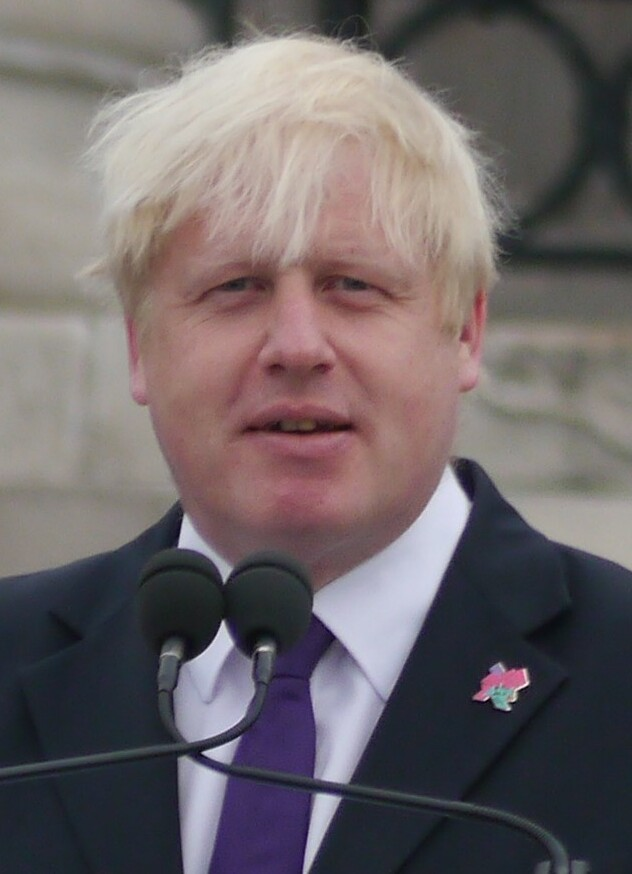

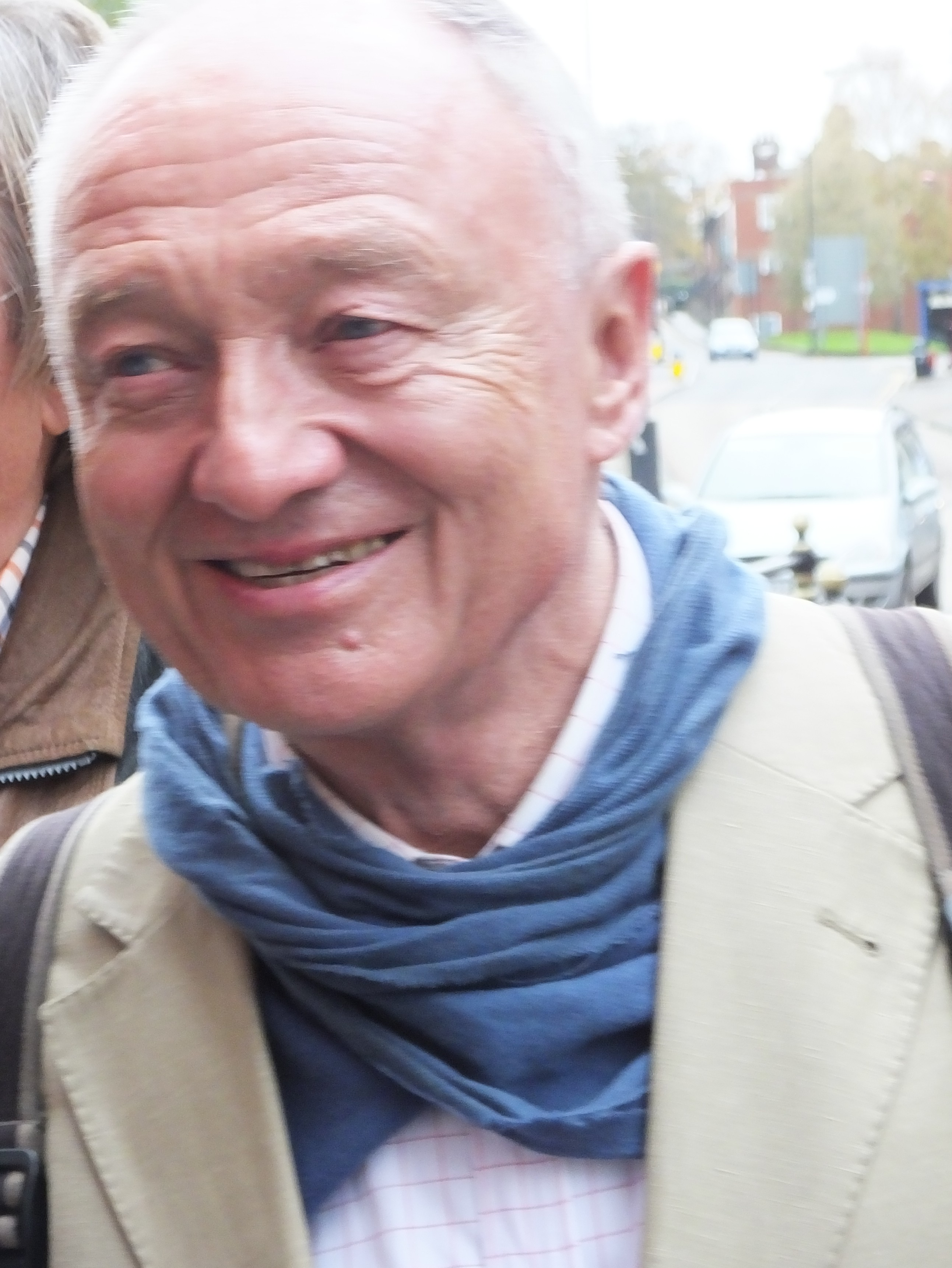
| Candidate | Boris Johnson | Ken Livingstone |
| Party | Conservative | Labour |
| First Round | 971,931 | 889,918 |
| Percentage | 44.0% | 40.3% |
| Swing | ▲0.4pp | ▲2.9pp |
| Second Round | 1,054,811 | 992,273 |
| Percentage | 51.5% | 48.5% |
| Swing | ▼1.7pp | ▲1.7pp |
- Result of voting by London borough. Blue boroughs are those with most votes for Boris Johnson and red those for Ken Livingstone
Mayor before election
Boris Johnson
Conservative
Elected Mayor
Boris Johnson
Conservative

The 2012 London mayoral election was an election held on Thursday 3 May 2012, to elect the Mayor of London. It was held on the same day as the London Assembly election, and used a supplementary vote system.

Incumbent Tory mayor and future Prime Minister Boris Johnson won re-election to a second term as Mayor. Ken Livingstone, who had been Mayor between 2000 and 2008, was seeking a third, non-consecutive term as the Labour candidate. No other candidates received 5% of the vote (the threshold for retaining their deposit). This was the last time that London voted for a Conservative Party Mayor, and remains the last time to date that the Conservatives have won any London-wide election.

== Background ==
At the 2008 mayoral election, Boris Johnson defeated incumbent mayor Ken Livingstone. Livingstone's defeat had been attributed to a loss of support amongst swing voters and voters in London's outer suburbs. The contest was also one of the 2008 local elections, which generally demonstrated poor results for Labour.

== Candidates and their selection processes ==
=== Conservative Party ===
Media reports alleged tension between Johnson and the national Conservative leadership as well as the Conservative-controlled central government. This might have led Johnson to seek a parliamentary seat to challenge these two entities rather than seek a second term as mayor. However, on 10 September 2010, he announced his intention to stand for a second term. At a re-selection meeting on 14 October 2010, he faced a period of questioning, before being unanimously adopted as the Conservatives' candidate.

=== Labour Party ===
The Labour Party candidate for Mayor was elected by an electoral college composed half-and-half of the votes of Labour members in London and the votes of affiliated organisations. The ballot papers were issued around early September 2010, and the winner was announced on 24 September. Four people initially sought the nomination: Ken Livingstone, Oona King, Seton During and Emmanuel Okoro.

Several Labour politicians such as Peter Mandelson, Tessa Jowell, Sadiq Khan, James Purnell, Lord Sugar, Alan Johnson, Tony McNulty and David Lammy were all touted as potential candidates, but none of these decided to stand. Ken Livingstone had announced his intention to regain the mayoralty in March 2009 and said at the time that he would stand as an independent if he failed to gain Labour's nomination, as he had done successfully in 2000. Former MP and Channel 4 Diversity Officer Oona King announced her bid for the candidacy in May 2010.

Prior to the vote, Livingstone gained the support of the GMB and Unite trade unions, as well as the backing of the majority of Labour members in the London Assembly. The Economist wrote that he was "by some distance the favourite to win the candidacy".

On 24 September 2010, the Labour Party announced that Livingstone had defeated King for the nomination by a wide margin, the former mayor gaining 68.8% of the total votes.

=== Liberal Democrats ===
Around the beginning of September 2010, the Liberal Democrats started accepting applications for their nominee. Lembit Öpik, Member of Parliament for Montgomeryshire from 1997 until his defeated re-election bid in 2010, said in June 2010 that he would like to be their candidate. Liberal Democrat councillor Duwayne Brooks, a friend of murdered black teenager Stephen Lawrence who was with him when he died, also put himself forward. Caroline Pidgeon, Floella Benjamin, Joanna Lumley, Brian Paddick and Susan Kramer were also seen as possible candidates. Jeremy Ambache, a former parliamentary candidate for Putney, also put his name down for selection for his party however he did not continue his campaign since he defected to Labour.

On 15 October 2010, plans for selecting a candidate were deferred for twelve months. On 12 July 2011, the new shortlist of four candidates was announced. As a result of the announcement of the shortlist a High Court complaint was lodged by Patrick Streeter who was unsuccessful in being shortlisted. Subsequently, the High Court ruled the Liberal Democrats selection process fair and lawful. The result was declared after a ballot of party members on 2 September. The four candidates were Öpik, Paddick, Brian Haley and Mike Tuffrey. Haley is a councillor in Haringey and was a member of the Labour Party until defecting in January 2010. Paddick was the party's candidate in 2008 and previously Deputy Assistant Commissioner of London's Metropolitan Police. Tuffrey led the Liberal Democrat group on the London Assembly between 2006 and 2010.

Liberal Democrat primary: 1st round
| Party | Candidate | Votes | % |
|---|---|---|---|
| Liberal Democrats | Brian Paddick | 1,289 | 41.7% |
| Liberal Democrats | Mike Tuffrey | 1,232 | 39.9% |
| Liberal Democrats | Brian Haley | 316 | 10.2% |
| Liberal Democrats | Lembit Öpik | 252 | 8.2% |
| Turnout | | 3,089 | |

Liberal Democrat primary: 2nd round, with change from 1st round
| Party | Candidate | Votes | % | ±% |
|---|---|---|---|---|
| Liberal Democrats | Brian Paddick | 1,567 | 51.5 | +9.8% |
| Liberal Democrats | Mike Tuffrey | 1,476 | 48.5 | +8.6% |
| | No 2nd preference | 46 | – | – |
| Majority | | 50 | 3.0 | |
| Turnout | | 3,089 | | |

=== Green Party ===
The Green Party announced its shortlist on 2 February 2011. London members chose Assembly member Jenny Jones, who won 67% of votes cast, over lecturer Shahrar Ali and writer Farid Bakht. Jenny Jones served as Deputy Mayor 2003–2004 during the first term of Ken Livingstone, when he was an independent Mayor.

=== British National Party ===
On 7 September 2011 the British National Party (BNP) announced London member Carlos Gerardo Cortiglia as its candidate, who is a press officer for the party. Cortiglia was born in Uruguay of Spanish and Italian ancestry and came to the United Kingdom in 1989. He has previously taken part in a televised abortion debate on RT (Russia Today) in his capacity as press officer and was a list candidate for the party in the assembly elections in 2004. He has worked for the BBC World Service and has been involved in several areas of the Foreign and Commonwealth Office, including television, radio and Internet via London Radio Service, British Satellite News, APTN and other media.

=== UK Independence Party ===
On 2 June 2011, an email was sent to all UKIP members from the Executive chairman setting out a timetable for selection and requesting applications from possible candidates. The party held an online poll, the results of which influenced the final vote. The six candidates were David Coburn, Michael Corby, Michael McGough, Paul Oakley, Winston McKenzie and Lawrence Webb. On 5 September 2011, Webb was selected by London members as the UKIP candidate. However, he stood under the description "Fresh Choice for London" rather than under the party label. This, the New Statesman revealed, was because of an error by the party, which forgot to put its name on the nomination papers.

UKIP primary
| Party | Candidate | Votes | % |
|---|---|---|---|
| UKIP | Lawrence Webb | Undisclosed | 42% |
| UKIP | David Coburn | Undisclosed | 29% |
| UKIP | Mick McGough | Undisclosed | 7.4% |
| UKIP | Winston McKenzie | Undisclosed | 7.4% |
| UKIP | Michael Corby | Undisclosed | Undisclosed |
| UKIP | Paul Oakley | Undisclosed | Undisclosed |

=== Independent ===
Ex-senior civil servant Siobhan Benita ran as an independent.

== Campaign ==
Much of the campaign period was focused on the tax affairs of the main two candidates, Boris Johnson and Ken Livingstone. The Livingstone campaign has been dogged by scandal over his tax affairs. Livingstone was accused of hypocrisy, having berated those who avoid tax while organising his own affairs in a manner that reduces his tax liabilities. It is claimed that he had his accountant arranged for his earnings from media work to be channelled into a private company to avoid the 50p top tax rate. Personal tensions between Livingstone and Johnson ran high, with Johnson cornering Livingstone in a lift and screaming, "You’re a fucking liar, you’re a fucking liar, you’re a fucking liar," after a radio interview in which Livingstone accused him of using similar arrangements.

Polling showed that Livingstone was less popular than the Labour Party, while Johnson was more popular than the Conservatives. In March, a Yougov poll indicated that almost 1 in 3 Labour voters would not be voting for Livingstone (31%). One website dedicated to Labour politics has highlighted this as a problem for his campaign saying:

Unless Labour divert valuable campaign time and resources to addressing Ken Livingstone's negatives, then the doubts which are driving away ever more Labour supporters will simply not be addressed.

Some in the Labour Party were critical of Livingstone off the record, with one MP speaking anonymously suggesting that the internal contest to pick a mayoral candidate had been started far too early, thus no alternative candidates had experienced electoral teams ready. Labour peer Lord Sugar urged people not to vote for Livingstone, while two other Labour peers, Lord Desai and Lord Winston, have also been critical of Livingstone.

Livingstone's core proposal was for a significant cut in public transport fares, although his ability to fund this was questioned.

=== Other candidates ===
Jenny Jones launched her mayoral campaign as the Green Party candidate on 16 October 2011 with the release of a mini manifesto.

Benita's supporters complained at her exclusion from several debates.

UKIP candidate Lawrence Webb was listed as 'Fresh Choice for London' rather than as the UK Independence Party on the ballot paper, albeit with the UKIP logo, after they filled in nomination papers incorrectly. UKIP leader Nigel Farage was described as "furious" at this, saying it was a "cockup" which cost UKIP votes.

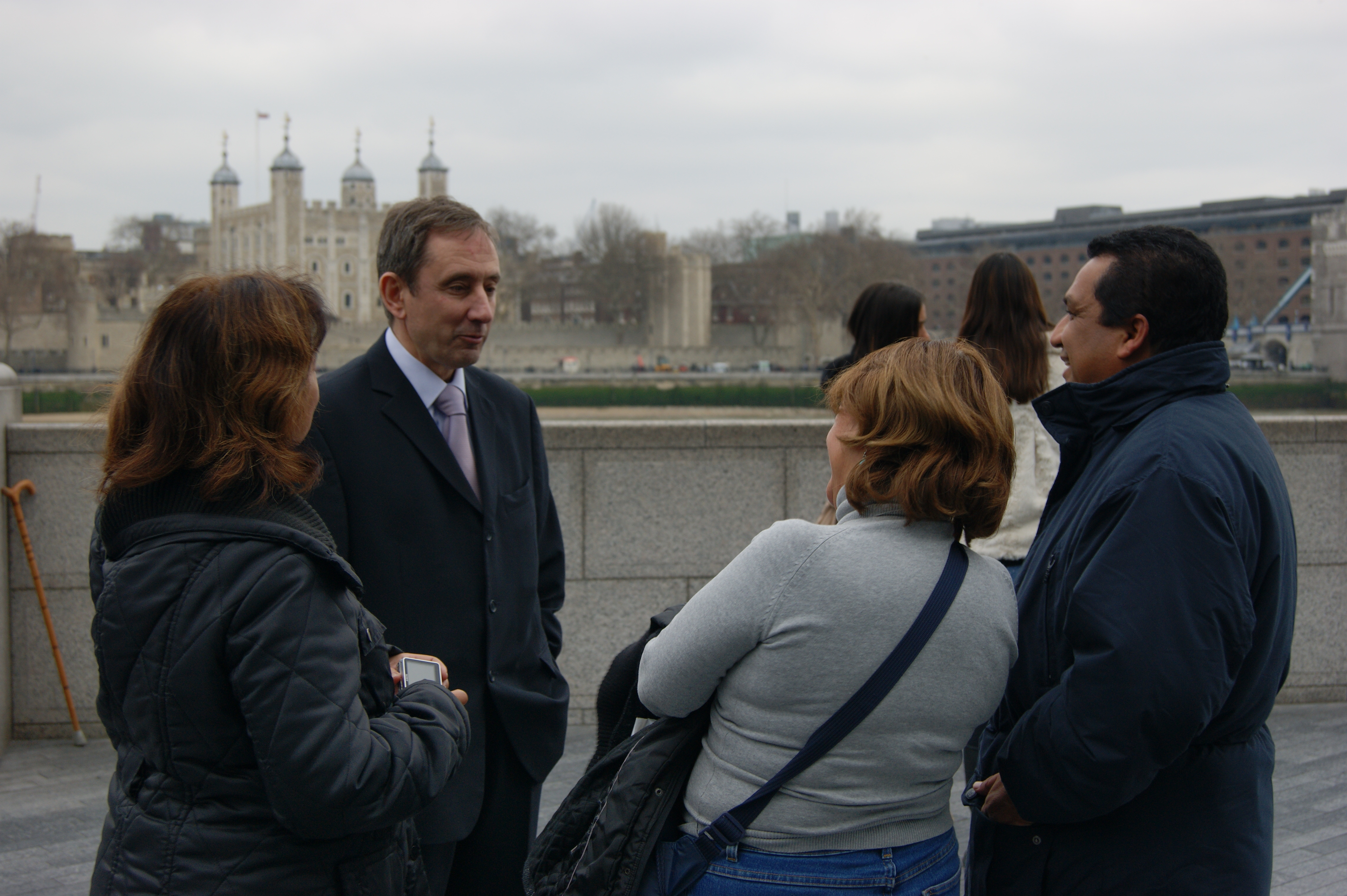
Cortiglia with members of the public

BNP candidate Calos Cortiglia's core policies included free weekend travel on public transport and a minimum five-year prison term for knife crime. His candidacy was marked by controversy over a 2003 interview, in which Cortiglia is quoted:

Soy argentino oriental, o dicho de otro modo, uruguayo de nacimiento, y me siento muy ligado emocionalmente a la República Argentina. En 1982 me ofrecí como voluntario para ir a las Islas Malvinas. Todo nació de mi gran interés por la historia y por haber crecido nutrido por los ideales de lo que podría haber sido y finalmente no fue. Esto me llevó finalmente a involucrarme en la carrera periodística que, en definitiva, fue lo que me trajo al Reino Unido.

That is, Cortiglia said that, feeling an emotional connection to Argentina, in 1982, he had volunteered to go to the Falkland Islands, which was interpreted as showing support for Argentina in the Falklands War. In 2011, Cortiglia labelled the erroneous suggestion that he had fought for Argentina as "far left fabrication" and explained the quote in La Nación so:

As a State employee and as a Uruguayan (not as a British citizen), I made a public pronouncement expressing the position of the Uruguayan government. If Argentina had suspected, at any point in time, that Uruguay would be siding with Britain or helping Britain, Uruguayan neutrality would have been compromised.

Cortiglia explained his reasons for joining the British National Party in a statement introducing his candidacy:

I want to help preserve the freedoms, values and traditions that help make this a great country to live in. That's why I joined the British National Party twelve years ago. I wanted to pay back the country that has been so kind to me and my family. I wanted to work with others who felt the same way as me.

=== Endorsements ===
==== Individuals ====
===== Ken Livingstone, Labour =====
- Polly Toynbee, journalist and writer
- Rabbi Danny Rich, chief executive of Liberal Judaism in the UK
- George Galloway, RESPECT politician
- Mehdi Hasan, political journalist, commentator and author
- Richard Rogers
- Owen Jones, newspaper columnist, commentator and author
- Steve Richards, television presenter and newspaper columnist

===== Boris Johnson, Conservative =====
- Dan Hodges, Labour member and newspaper columnist
- Ivan Massow

==== Newspapers ====
| Daily Mirror | Labour |
| The Guardian | Labour |
| The Sunday Telegraph | Conservative |
| The Economist | Conservative |
| Evening Standard | Conservative |
| City AM | Conservative |

=== Second preference endorsements ===
Under the supplementary vote system used in the election, the voters were invited to express a first and a second preference. Some mayoral candidates had explicitly recommended how their supporters should use their second preference. The membership of the London Green Party voted to recommend that their supporters rank Livingstone second; Jenny Jones had previously been Livingstone's deputy mayor in his first term. Johnson's campaign described Livingstone as planning a coalition with the Greens.

Having initially recommended a second preference for independent candidate Benita, UKIP switched to urging a second preference for Johnson, criticising Benita as having "New Labour" leanings. Paddick and the Liberal Democrats said they would not "patronise our supporters by telling them how to use their second preference."

The BNP candidate, Cortiglia, had said he was giving his second preference vote to Livingstone.

== Opinion polls ==
In the run-up to the election, several polling organisations carried out public opinion polling in regard to voting intentions. Results of these polls are displayed below. The figures sometimes show extrapolations from the raw data contained in the pdf files, and in several cases the percentages are not directly referable to that data.

ARPO, ICM, Ipsos MORI, Populus, TNS-BMRB (formerly TNS System Three) and YouGov are members of the British Polling Council, and abide by its disclosure rules.

=== Graphical summaries ===
==== 5 way polling ====
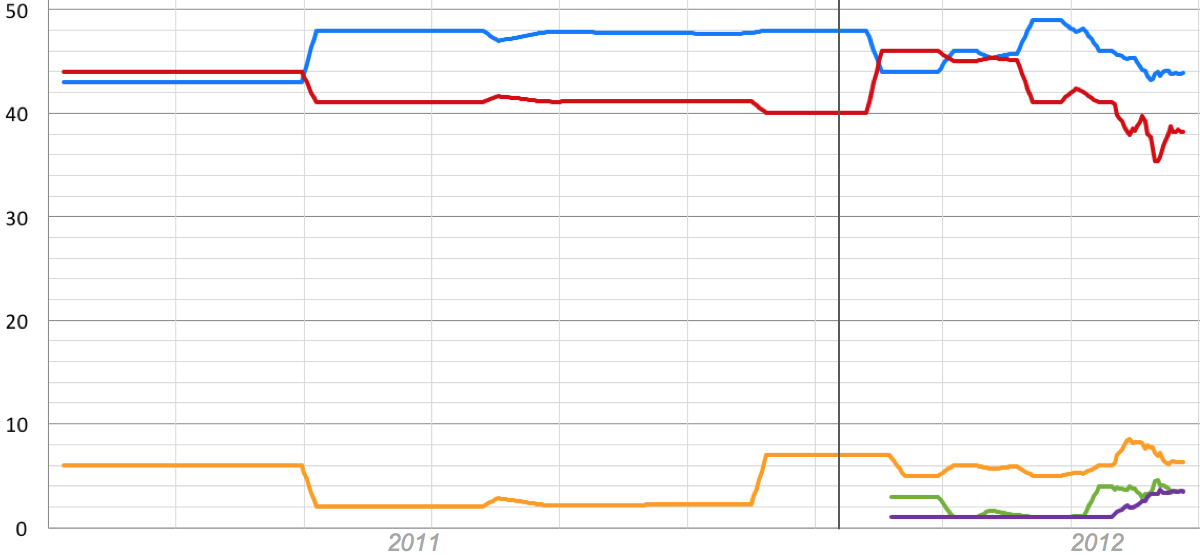
London opinion polling for the 2012 mayoral election (moving average is calculated from the last six polls) Johnson Livingstone Paddick Jones Webb

==== Johnson vs. Livingstone ====
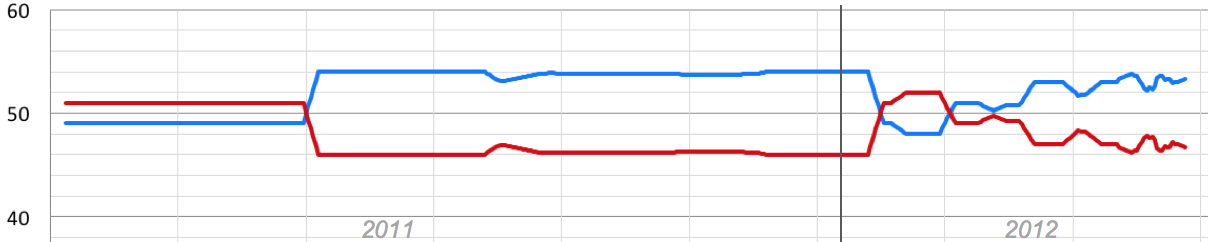
London opinion polling for the 2012 mayoral election between Boris Johnson and Ken Livingstone (moving average is calculated from the last six polls) Johnson Livingstone

=== 2012 ===
| Date | Pollster | Sample size | First preference | | | | | | | Final round | |
| Date | Pollster | Sample size | Johnson | Livingstone | Paddick | Jones | Cortiglia | Webb | Benita | Johnson | Livingstone |
|---|---|---|---|---|---|---|---|---|---|---|---|
| 3 May | Election results | 2,208,475 | 44.0% | 40.3% | 4.2% | 4.5% | 1.3% | 2.0% | 3.8% | 51.5% | 48.5% |
| 30 Apr – 3 May | YouGov | 2,119 | 43% | 38% | 7% | 3% | 1% | 4% | 4% | 53% | 47% |
| 27–29 Apr | YouGov | 1,231 | 44% | 41% | 6% | 3% | 1% | 3% | 3% | 52% | 48% |
| 27–29 Apr | Populus | 1,500 | 46% | 34% | 5% | 6% | 1% | 3% | 5% | 56% | 44% |
| 18–24 Apr | Survation | 1,443 | 42% | 31% | 10% | 4% | 4% | 5% | 3% | 55% | 45% |
| 23–25 Apr | ComRes | 1,443 | 45% | 36% | 5% | 6% | 2% | 2% | 3% | 53% | 47% |
| 20–22 Apr | YouGov | 1,138 | 43% | 41% | 8% | 2% | 1% | 3% | 3% | 51% | 49% |
| 12–16 Apr | TNS-BMRB | 1,008 | 45% | 35% | 11% | 5% | 1% | 2% | – | 55% | 45% |
| 13–15 Apr | YouGov | 1,060 | 45% | 40% | 7% | 2% | 1% | 3% | 2% | 53% | 47% |
| 2–5 Apr | ComRes | 1,003 | 46% | 41% | 6% | 4% | 1% | 1% | 0% | 53% | 47% |
| 12–15 March | YouGov | 1,226 | 49% | 41% | 5% | 1% | 0% | 1% | – | 53% | 47% |
| 7–10 Feb | YouGov | 1,106 | 46% | 45% | 6% | 1% | 1% | 1% | – | 51% | 49% |
| 19–21 Jan | ComRes | 1,106 | 44% | 46% | 5% | 3% | 1% | 1% | – | 48% | 52% |
| 10–16 Jan | YouGov | 1,349 | 44% | 46% | 7% | – | – | – | – | 49% | 51% |

=== 2011 ===
| Date | Pollster | Sample size | First preference | | | | Final round | |
| Date | Pollster | Sample size | Johnson | Livingstone | Paddick | Other | Johnson | Livingstone |
|---|---|---|---|---|---|---|---|---|
| 27 Nov | ComRes | Unknown | 48% | 40% | 7% | 4% | 54% | 46% |
| 7–9 June | YouGov | 1,215 | 48% | 41% | 2% (Note: Asked as "Liberal Democrat candidate") | 9% | 54% | 46% |
| 17–21 Mar | ComRes | 1,003 | 43% | 44% | 6% (Note: Asked as "Liberal Democrat candidate (to be confirmed)") | 7% | 49% | 51% |

== Results ==
Mayor of London election 3 May 2012
| Party | Candidate | 1st round | | 2nd round | | | 1st round votesTransfer votes, 2nd round |
| Party | Candidate | Total | Of round | Transfers | Total | Of round | 1st round votesTransfer votes, 2nd round |
|---|---|---|---|---|---|---|---|
| Conservative | Boris Johnson | 971,931 | 44.0% | 82,880 | 1,054,811 | 51.5% | |
| Labour | Ken Livingstone | 889,918 | 40.3% | 102,355 | 992,273 | 48.5% | |
| Green | Jenny Jones | 98,913 | 4.5% | | | | |
| Liberal Democrats | Brian Paddick | 91,774 | 4.2% | | | | |
| Independent | Siobhan Benita | 83,914 | 3.8% | | | | |
| UKIP | Lawrence Webb | 43,274 | 2.0% | | | | |
| BNP | Carlos Gerardo Cortiglia | 28,751 | 1.3% | | | | |
| Conservative hold | | | | | | | |

== Maps ==
Results by assembly constituency

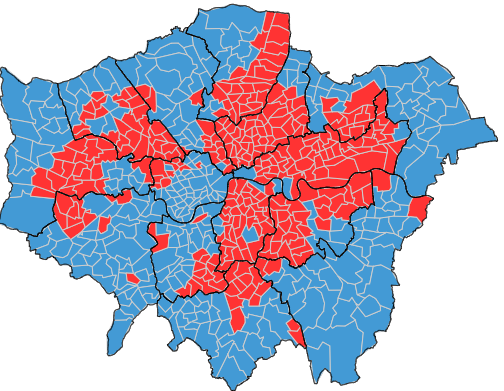
Result by electoral ward

The turnout was 38.1%, a decrease from 45.33% in the previous election.

Shortly before midnight on 4 May, Boris Johnson was declared the re-elected Mayor of London.
