= David Kurten =

British politician (born 1971)

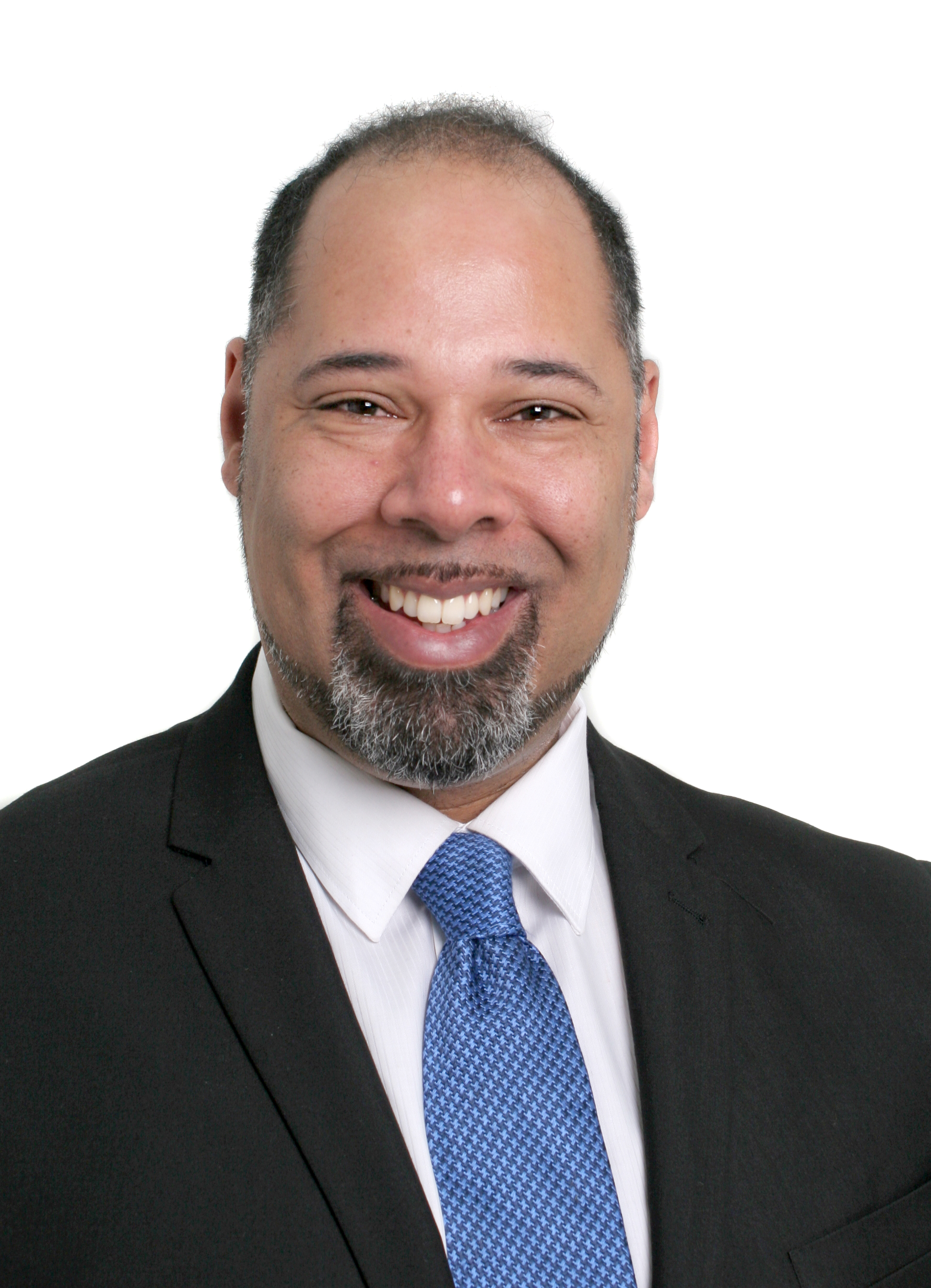
- Kurten in 2016

Leader of the Heritage Party
- Incumbent
- Assumed office September 2020

Member of the London Assembly as an additional member
- In office 6 May 2016 – 6 May 2021
- Preceded by: Stephen Knight
- Succeeded by: Emma Best

Deputy leader of the Brexit Alliance
- In office 2018 – 6 May 2021
- Leader: Peter Whittle

UKIP portfolios
- 2016–2018: Education

Personal details
- Born: 22 March 1971 (age 55) Littlehampton, Sussex, England
- Party: Heritage Party (since September 2020)
- Other political affiliations: Brexit Alliance (2018–2021); UK Independence Party (2012–2020)
- Education: University of St Andrews (BSc); University of Bath (PGCE); University of Southampton (MRes)
- Occupation: Politician
- Website: https://www.davidkurten.net/

David Michael Kurten (born 22 March 1971) is a British politician who has served as leader of the Heritage Party since September 2020. He was previously a member of the London Assembly (AM) as an additional member from 2016 to 2021. Elected as a UK Independence Party (UKIP) candidate, he subsequently left the party in January 2020. He is the registered leader of the Heritage Party and characterises himself as a social conservative.

== Early life and career ==
David Michael Kurten was born in Littlehampton in Sussex on 22 March 1971 to parents Reginald Kurten and Patricia Kurten. The son of a British mother and Jamaican father, Kurten was raised by his single mother and his maternal grandparents in Sussex. He studied chemistry at the University of St Andrews, graduating BSc in 1993, before completing a PGCE at the University of Bath in 1995 and graduating MRes in chemistry at the University of Southampton in 1998.

Between 1995 and 2016 he taught chemistry at schools in the UK, Botswana, Bosnia and Herzegovina, Bermuda, and the United States.

== Political career ==
=== UK Independence Party ===
At the 2015 general election, Kurten stood for the UK Independence Party (UKIP) in Camberwell and Peckham, coming fifth with 4.7% of the vote. He was second in the UKIP London-wide list in the 2016 London Assembly election and was elected to the London Assembly alongside Peter Whittle, with the party getting 171,069 votes. In October 2016, Kurten announced his intention to stand for UKIP leader following the resignation of Diane James after just 18 days. However, he withdrew from the contest and endorsed Paul Nuttall. Following the contest, Nuttall appointed Kurten as the party's education spokesperson on 30 November 2016.

At the 2017 general election Kurten stood in the Essex constituency of Castle Point, winning 5.3% of the vote, which was sufficient for him to retain his deposit. Kurten ran in the 2017 UKIP leadership election, where he came third, with Henry Bolton elected as leader. Kurten stepped down from the UKIP frontbench on 22 January 2018 in protest at Bolton's refusal to stand down as leader after receiving a vote of no confidence from the party's national executive committee the previous day. He returned after Gerard Batten became leader on 14 April.

In the May 2018 local elections, Kurten unsuccessfully contested his local Sidcup ward in the London Borough of Bexley. He then stood as UKIP's candidate in the Lewisham East by-election on 14 June 2018, getting 1.7% of the vote. This by-election was mired in controversy, with left-wing activists disrupting a hustings event and abusing Kurten as he arrived; the meeting was stopped by police as Kurten began his speech. In December 2018, Kurten again resigned from the UKIP frontbench, this time on account of the anti-Islam direction of UKIP under the party's then-leader Gerard Batten, most significantly Batten's appointment of activist Tommy Robinson as an advisor on grooming gangs. On 12 December 2018, following Peter Whittle's departure from UKIP, he and Kurten disbanded the UKIP grouping on the London Assembly and formed the Brexit Alliance group, though Kurten remained a member of UKIP.

In December 2019, Kurten stood as the UKIP candidate in the constituency of Bognor Regis and Littlehampton in the 2019 general election after the new Brexit Party announced that it would not be contesting seats won by the Conservative Party at the 2017 general election. His vote share was 1.7%.

=== Heritage Party ===
In the London Assembly, he confronted Sadiq Khan on what he called "gender ideology" by promoting "traditional family values", and as a Brexit campaigner he opposed Khan's support for the EU and call for a second referendum.

In January 2020, Kurten announced he would run as an independent candidate in the upcoming London mayoral and London Assembly elections (then scheduled for May 2020, but both elections were postponed to 2021 due to the COVID-19 pandemic). Kurten founded a new political party in 2020: the Heritage Party was registered with the Electoral Commission that October. Kurten finished 15th with 11,025 votes in the mayoral election, while his party finished 13th on the London-wide list with 13,534 votes.

During the COVID-19 pandemic, Kurten spread contested COVID-19 claims by stating that the disease was no worse than the flu. In December 2020, Kurten rejected a COVID-19 vaccine, for which he was denounced by the Conservative mayoral candidate Shaun Bailey, who saw this as irresponsible for an elected politician. Kurten opposed lockdowns implemented in response to the COVID-19 pandemic, and he attended protests against UK government policies.

The Heritage Party got 1.6% of the vote, coming fourth, in the 2021 Hartlepool by-election with 468 votes. In the 2021 London elections, Kurten received 0.4% of the vote in the mayoral election, coming fifteenth, while the Heritage party list, headed by Kurten, received 0.5% in the Assembly vote. He was, thus, not re-elected.

Kurten contested the December 2021 Old Bexley and Sidcup by-election, finishing ninth, with 116 votes (0.5%).

At the 2023 Arun District Council election, he came last in the Aldwick West ward with 148 votes.

At the 2024 general election, Kurten ran again in Bognor Regis and Littlehampton, finishing last with 708 votes (1.5%).

== Electoral performance ==
=== House of Commons ===
==== UKIP ====
General election 2015: Camberwell and Peckham
Party	Candidate	Votes	%	±%
Labour	Harriet Harman	32,614	63.3	+4.1
Conservative	Naomi Newstead	6,790	13.2	+0.2
Green	Amelia Womack	5,187	10.1	+7.2
Liberal Democrats	Yahaya Kiyingi	2,580	5.0	–17.4
UKIP	David Kurten	2,413	4.7	New
All People's Party	Prem Goyal	829	1.6	New
NHA	Rebecca Fox	466	0.9	New
TUSC	Nick Wrack	292	0.6	New
CISTA	Alex Robertson	197	0.4	New
Workers Revolutionary	Joshua Ogunleye	107	0.2	–0.3
Whig	Felicity Anscomb	86	0.2	New
Majority		25,824	50.1	+11.3
Turnout		51,561	62.3	+3.0
Registered electors		82,746		
Labour hold		Swing	+2.0	

General election 2017: Castle Point
Party	Candidate	Votes	%	±%
Conservative	Rebecca Harris	30,076	67.3	+16.4
Labour	Joseph Cooke	11,204	25.1	+11.3
UKIP	David Kurten	2,381	5.3	−25.9
Liberal Democrats	Tom Holder	1,049	2.3	+0.5
Majority		18,872	42.2	+22.5
Turnout		44,710	64.4	−2.3
Conservative hold		Swing	+2.6	

2018 Lewisham East by-election
Party	Candidate	Votes	%	±%
Labour	Janet Daby	11,033	50.2	−17.7
Liberal Democrats	Lucy Salek	5,404	24.6	+20.2
Conservative	Ross Archer	3,161	14.4	−8.6
Green	Rosamund Kissi-Debrah	788	3.6	+1.9
Women's Equality	Mandu Reid	506	2.3	New
UKIP	David Kurten	380	1.7	0.0
For Britain	Anne Marie Waters	266	1.2	New
CPA	Maureen Martin	168	0.8	+0.3
Monster Raving Loony	Howling Laud Hope	93	0.4	New
Democrats and Veterans	Massimo DiMambro	67	0.3	New
Libertarian	Sean Finch	38	0.2	New
No description	Charles Carey	37	0.2	New
Radical Party	Patrick Gray	20	0.1	New
Young People's Party UK	Thomas Hall	18	0.1	New
Majority		5,629	25.6	−19.3
Turnout		22,056	33.3	−36.1
Registered electors		66,140		
Labour hold		Swing	-19.0	

General election 2019: Bognor Regis and Littlehampton
Party	Candidate	Votes	%	±%
Conservative	Nick Gibb	32,521	63.5	+4.5
Labour	Alan Butcher	10,018	19.6	−5.3
Liberal Democrats	Francis Oppler	5,645	11.0	+4.5
Green	Carol Birch	1,826	3.6	+1.7
UKIP	David Kurten	846	1.7	−1.9
Independent	Andrew Elston	367	0.7	New
Majority		22,503	43.9	+9.8
Turnout		51,223	66.1	−1.6
Conservative hold		Swing	+4.9	

==== Heritage Party ====
2021 Old Bexley and Sidcup by-election
Party	Candidate	Votes	%	±%
Conservative	Louie French	11,189	51.5	−13.0
Labour	Daniel Francis	6,711	30.9	+7.4
Reform	Richard Tice	1,432	6.6	N/A
Green	Jonathan Rooks	830	3.8	+0.6
Liberal Democrats	Simone Reynolds	647	3.0	−5.3
English Democrat	Elaine Cheeseman	271	1.3	N/A
UKIP	John Poynton	184	0.8	N/A
Rejoin EU	Richard Hewison	151	0.7	N/A
Heritage	David Kurten	116	0.5	N/A
CPA	Carol Valinejad	108	0.5	±0.0
Monster Raving Loony	Mad Mike Young	94	0.4	N/A
Majority		4,478	20.6	−20.4
Turnout		21,733	33.5	−36.3
Rejected ballots		50	0.2	
Total ballots		21,783	33.6	
Registered electors		64,831		
Conservative hold		Swing	-10.2	

General election 2024: Bognor Regis and Littlehampton
Party	Candidate	Votes	%	±%
Conservative	Alison Griffiths	15,678	32.8	–29.4
Labour	Clare Walsh	13,913	29.1	+10.1
Reform	Sandra Daniells	10,262	21.5	N/A
Liberal Democrats	Henry Jones	5,081	10.6	–2.7
Green	Carol Birch	2,185	4.6	+1.3
Heritage	David Kurten	708	1.5	N/A
Majority		1,765	3.7	–39.5
Turnout		47,827	61.7	–6.5
Registered electors		77,565		
Conservative hold		Swing	▼19.8	

=== London elections ===
2016 London Assembly election
List	Candidates	Votes	Of total (%)	± from prev.
Labour	Fiona Twycross (105,480), Tom Copley (95,891), Nicky Gavron (87,900), Murad Qureshi (81,139), Alison Moore, Preston Tabois, Feryal Demirci, Mike Katz, Emily Brothers, Bevan Powell, Sara Hyde	1,054,801	40.3%	–0.8%
Conservative	Kemi Badenoch (127,372), Andrew Boff (109,176), Shaun Bailey (95,529), Susan Hall (84,914), Amandeep Bhogal, Joanne Laban, Antonia Cox, Joy Morrissey, Timothy Barnes, Gregory Stafford, Kishan Devani, Jonathan Cope	764,230	29.2%	–2.8%
Green	Siân Berry (207,959), Caroline Russell (103,980), Shahrar Ali (69,320), Jonathan Bartley, Noel Lynch, Rashid Nix, Dee Searle, Benali Hamdache, Andrea Carey Fuller, Anne RoseMary Warrington, Peter Underwood	207,959	8.0%	–0.6%
UKIP	Peter Whittle (171,069), David Kurten (85,535), Lawrence Webb (57,023), Peter Harris, Neville Watson, Piers Wauchope, Afzal Akram, Elizabeth Jones, Tariq Saeed, Freddy Vachha, Peter Staveley	171,069	6.5%	+2.0%
Liberal Democrats	Caroline Pidgeon (165,580), Emily Davey (82,790), Merlene Emerson, Robert Blackie, Zack Polanski, Dawn Barnes, Annabel Mullin, Marisha Ray, Adrian Hyyrylainen-Trett, Pauline Pearce, Benjamin Mathis	165,580	6.3%	–0.5%
Women's Equality	Sophie Walker, Harini Iyengar, Jacquelyn Guderley, Alison Marshall, Rebecca Manson Jones, Anila Dhami, Isabelle Parasram, Chris Paouros, Joanna Shaw, Kate Massey-Chase, Melanie Howard	91,772	3.5%	N/A
Respect	George Galloway, Akib Mahmood, Mikail Rayne, Clare McCaughey, Rehiana Ali, Terry Hoy, Simon Virgo, Saurav Dutt, Tehmeena Mahmood, Karina Lockhart	41,324	1.6%	N/A
Britain First	Jayda Fransen, Paul Golding, Christine Smith, Anne Elstone, Nancy Smith, Hollie Rouse, Peggy Saunders, Donna King, Kevan McMullen, Steven Connor	39,071	1.5%	N/A
CPA	Malcolm Martin, Maureen Martin, Yemi Awolola, Helen Spiby-Vann, Ray Towey, Damilola Adewuyi, Kathy Mils, Kayode Shedono, Des Coke, Ashley Dickenson, Stephen Hammond, Kevin Nichols	27,172	1.0%	–0.8%
Animal Welfare	Vanessa Hudson, Jonathan Homan, Alexander Bourke, Linda Seddon, Zsanett Csontos	25,810	1.0%	N/A
BNP	David Furness, Paul Sturdy, John Clarke, Michael Jones, Peter Finch, Nicola Finch, Denise Underwood, Stephen Dillon, Philip Dalton, Gareth Jones, Beb Smith	15,833	0.6%	–1.5%
The House Party	Terry McGrenera	11,055	0.4%	+0.1%

2021 London Assembly election
List	Candidates	Votes	Of total (%)	± from prev.
Labour	Elly Baker (98,661), Sakina Sheikh (89,692), Murad Qureshi (82,217), Emine Ibrahim, Faduma Hassan, Sophie Charman-Blower, Bob Littlewood, Miriam Mirwitch, Shahina Jaffer, Taranjit Chana, James Beckles	986,609	38.1%	▼2.2%
Conservative	Shaun Bailey† (132,514), Andrew Boff (113,583), Susan Hall (99,385), Emma Best (88,342), Selina Seesunkur (79,508), Toby Williams, Ahmereen Reza, Timothy Briggs, Simon Hoar, John Riley, Julian Gallant, George Currie	795,081	30.7%	▲1.5%
Green	Siân Berry† (305,452), Caroline Russell (152,726), Zack Polanski (101,817), Benali Hamdache (76,363), Shahrar Ali, Rosamund Kissi-Debrah, Ben Fletcher, Hannah Graham, Peter Underwood, Kirsten De Keyser, Jarelle Francis	305,452	11.8%	▲3.8%
Liberal Democrats	Caroline Pidgeon (189,522), Hina Bokhari (94,761), Robert Blackie (63,174), Chris Maines, Joyce Onstad, Irina von Wiese, Hussain Khan, Michael Bukola, Adrian Hyyrylainen-Trett, Adetokunbo Fatukasi, Charley Hasted	189,522	7.3%	▲1.0%
Women's Equality	Harini Iyengar, Jacueline Dean, Tabitha Morton, Rebecca Manson-Jones, Nikki Uppal, Pamela Ritchie, Leila Fazal, Sarabajaya Kumar, Guilene Marcor, Sellisha Lockyer, Korina Holmes, Maureen Obi-Ezekpazu, Georgina Ladbury	55,684	2.2%	▼1.3%
Rejoin EU	Richard Hewison†, Deborah Iliffe, Charlotte Blake, John Stevens, Brendan Donnelly, Rory Fitzgerald, Benrd Rendic, Philipp Gnatzy, Karol Bobal, Raj Kumar, Javern Pond	49,389	1.9%	New
Animal Welfare	Vanessa Hudson†, Sam Morland, Alex Bourke, Femy Amin, Mark Scott, Julian Weisman	44,667	1.7%	▲0.7%
CPA	Maureen Maud Marin, Helen Spiby-Vann, Ashley Keith Dickenson, Carol Valinejad, Eunice Oruyinka Ade Odesanmi, Katherine Susan Hortense, Desmond Coke, Donald Akhigbe	28,878	1.1%	▲0.1%
UKIP	Peter Gammons†, Elizabeth Jones, Julie Carter, Stuart Freeman, Marjan Keqaj, Kakala Nyembwe, Ziz Kakoulakis, Geoffrey Courtenay, Anil Bhatti, Amir Latif, Simon Harman	27,114	1.0%	▼5.5%
Reform	Richard Tice, David Bull, Robert Poll, Dominique Day, Michael Pastor, Saradhi Rajan, Ian Price, Edward Apostolides, Mark Simpson, Michael Anthony, John Cronin	25,009	1.0%	New
London Real Party	Brian Rose†, Paul Frost, Kim Murray, Julian Bailes	18,395	0.7%	New
Let London Live	Piers Corbyn†, Heiko Khoo, Sylvia Da Barca, Julia Stephenson, Renos Samson	15,755	0.6%	New
Heritage	David Kurten†, Sean Finch, Lewis Glyn, Zachary Stiling, Barbara Ray, Dominic Stockford	13,534	0.5%	New
TUSC	Nancy Taaffe, April Ashley, Lewis Baker, Deji Olayinka, Andrew Walker, Thea Everett, Lawanya Ramajayam, Jack Jeffery, Marvin Hay, Len Hockey, Lois Austin, Bob Law, Ferdy Lyons, Rachel Lyon, Naomi Bryan, Pete Mason, Angharad Hillier, Hugo Pierre, Brian Debus, Mira Glavardanov, Niall Mulholland, John Viner, Wally Kennedy, Paul Kershaw, Paul Scott	9,004	0.3%	New
Communist	Robin Talbot, Judith Cazorla Rodenas, Philip Wedgwood Brand, Akira Allman, Lorraine Douglas, Stewart McGill, Lucian Branescu-Mihaila, Anita Halpin, Hannah Sawtwell	8,787	0.3%	New
SDP	Eric Siva-Jothy, Stephen Gardner, Matthew Beresford, Simon Marshall, Brilant Krasniqi, Seth Liebowitz, Tricia Bracher, Rosamund Hubley	7,782	0.3%	New
Londependence	Bella Roberts, Tom Foster, Daniel Jacobs, John Halnan	5,746	0.2%	New
National Liberal	Upkar Rai, Arunasalam Rajalingam, Faisal Maramazi, Araz Yurdseven, Ponniah Yogaraja	2,860	0.1%	New

2021 London mayoral election
Party	Candidate	1st round		2nd round			1st round votesTransfer votes, 2nd round
Party	Candidate	Total	Of round	Transfers	Total	Of round	1st round votesTransfer votes, 2nd round
Labour	Sadiq Khan	1,013,721	40.0%	192,313	1,206,034	55.2%	
Conservative	Shaun Bailey	893,051	35.3%	84,550	977,601	44.8%	
Green	Siân Berry	197,976	7.8%				
Liberal Democrats	Luisa Porritt	111,716	4.4%				
Independent	Niko Omilana	49,628	2.0%				
Reclaim	Laurence Fox	47,634	1.9%				
London Real	Brian Rose	31,111	1.2%				
Rejoin EU	Richard Hewison	28,012	1.1%				
Count Binface	Count Binface	24,775	1.0%				
Women's Equality	Mandu Reid	21,182	0.8%				
Let London Live	Piers Corbyn	20,604	0.8%				
Animal Welfare	Vanessa Hudson	16,826	0.7%				
UKIP	Peter Gammons	14,393	0.6%				
Independent	Farah London	11,869	0.5%				
Heritage	David Kurten	11,025	0.4%				
Independent	Nims Obunge	9,682	0.4%				
SDP	Steve Kelleher	8,764	0.3%				
Renew	Kam Balayev	7,774	0.3%				
Independent	Max Fosh	6,309	0.2%				
Burning Pink	Valerie Brown	5,305	0.2%				
Labour hold							
