= London mayoral elections =

Election for the Mayor of London

The London mayoral election for the office of mayor of London takes place every four years. The first election was held in May 2000, and six subsequent elections have taken place. The latest mayoral election took place in 2024.

== Electoral system ==
The electoral system used for London mayor elections is the supplementary vote method, except in 2024 when the first-past-the-post system was substituted by the Elections Act 2022, which was passed by the Conservative government. In 2026, the Labour government restored the supplementary vote.

In elections held using the supplementary vote system, voters express a first and second choice of candidate. If no candidate receives an absolute majority of first choice votes, all but the two leading candidates are eliminated, and the votes of those eliminated are redistributed according to their second choice votes to determine the winner. (In the first-past-the-post system, voters cast their vote for a candidate of their choice and the candidate who received the most votes won.)

As with most elected posts in the United Kingdom, a candidate must pay a deposit to run in the election. The current deposit a candidate must pay is £10,000, which is returned if the candidate wins at least 5% of the votes cast (first preference votes before 2022). The winner is elected for a fixed term of four years; there are no restrictions on the number of terms a mayor may serve. Elections are held in May.

== Results ==
=== Elections in the 2020s ===
==== 2024 ====
2024 London mayoral election
Party	Candidate	Votes	Of total (%)	± (pp), party
Labour	Sadiq Khan	1,088,225	43.8	+3.8
Conservative	Susan Hall	812,397	32.7	−2.6
Liberal Democrats	Rob Blackie	145,184	5.8	+1.4
Green	Zoë Garbett	145,114	5.8	−2.0
Reform	Howard Cox	78,865	3.1	New
Independent	Natalie Campbell	47,815	1.9	New
SDP	Amy Gallagher	34,449	1.4	+1.1
Animal Welfare	Femy Amin	29,280	1.2	New
Independent	Andreas Michli	26,121	1.1	New
Independent	Tarun Ghulati	24,702	1.0	New
Binface	Count Binface	24,260	1.0	0.0
Britain First	Nick Scanlon	20,519	0.8	New
London Real	Brian Rose	7,501	0.3	−0.9
Majority		276,008	11.1	
Rejected ballots		11,127	0.4	
Turnout		2,495,559	40.5	−1.5
Registered electors		6,162,428		
Labour hold				

==== 2021 ====
Incumbent Labour mayor Sadiq Khan won re-election against Conservative candidate Shaun Bailey.

Mayor of London election 6 May 2021
Party	Candidate	1st round		2nd round			1st round votesTransfer votes, 2nd round
Party	Candidate	Total	Of round	Transfers	Total	Of round	1st round votesTransfer votes, 2nd round
Labour	Sadiq Khan	1,013,721	40.0%	192,313	1,206,034	55.2%	
Conservative	Shaun Bailey	893,051	35.3%	84,550	977,601	44.8%	
Green	Siân Berry	197,976	7.8%				
Liberal Democrats	Luisa Porritt	111,716	4.4%				
Independent	Niko Omilana	49,628	2.0%				
Reclaim	Laurence Fox	47,634	1.9%				
London Real	Brian Rose	31,111	1.2%				
Rejoin EU	Richard Hewison	28,012	1.1%				
Count Binface	Count Binface	24,775	1.0%				
Women's Equality	Mandu Reid	21,182	0.8%				
Let London Live	Piers Corbyn	20,604	0.8%				
Animal Welfare	Vanessa Hudson	16,826	0.7%				
UKIP	Peter Gammons	14,393	0.6%				
Independent	Farah London	11,869	0.5%				
Heritage	David Kurten	11,025	0.4%				
Independent	Nims Obunge	9,682	0.4%				
SDP	Steve Kelleher	8,764	0.3%				
Renew	Kam Balayev	7,774	0.3%				
Independent	Max Fosh	6,309	0.2%				
Burning Pink	Valerie Brown	5,305	0.2%				
Labour hold							

=== Elections in the 2010s ===
==== 2016 ====
The 2016 London mayoral election was held on 5 May 2016. The incumbent mayor, Boris Johnson, did not run for re-election for a third term in office, as he was elected the member of parliament for Uxbridge and South Ruislip in the 2015 general election.

Mayor of London election 5 May 2016
Party	Candidate	1st round		2nd round			1st round votesTransfer votes, 2nd round
Party	Candidate	Total	Of round	Transfers	Total	Of round	1st round votesTransfer votes, 2nd round
Labour	Sadiq Khan	1,148,716	44.2%	161,427	1,310,143	56.8%	
Conservative	Zac Goldsmith	909,755	35.0%	84,859	994,614	43.2%	
Green	Siân Berry	150,673	5.8%				
Liberal Democrats	Caroline Pidgeon	120,005	4.6%				
UKIP	Peter Whittle	94,373	3.6%				
Women's Equality	Sophie Walker	53,055	2.0%				
Respect	George Galloway	37,007	1.4%				
Britain First	Paul Golding	31,372	1.2%				
CISTA	Lee Harris	20,537	0.8%				
BNP	David Furness	13,325	0.5%				
Independent	Prince Zylinski	13,202	0.5%				
One Love	Ankit Love	4,941	0.2%				
Labour gain from Conservative							

==== 2012 ====
The Conservative mayor Boris Johnson was elected to a second term in office, defeating former Labour mayor Ken Livingstone. Livingstone announced his retirement from politics in his concession speech.

Mayor of London election 3 May 2012
Party	Candidate	1st round		2nd round			1st round votesTransfer votes, 2nd round
Party	Candidate	Total	Of round	Transfers	Total	Of round	1st round votesTransfer votes, 2nd round
Conservative	Boris Johnson	971,931	44.0%	82,880	1,054,811	51.5%	
Labour	Ken Livingstone	889,918	40.3%	102,355	992,273	48.5%	
Green	Jenny Jones	98,913	4.5%				
Liberal Democrats	Brian Paddick	91,774	4.2%				
Independent	Siobhan Benita	83,914	3.8%				
UKIP	Lawrence Webb	43,274	2.0%				
BNP	Carlos Cortiglia	28,751	1.3%				
Conservative hold							

=== Elections in the 2000s ===
==== 2008 ====
The incumbent Labour mayor, Ken Livingstone was defeated by Conservative candidate Boris Johnson, who became London's second mayor.

Mayor of London election 1 May 2008
Party	Candidate	1st round		2nd round			1st round votesTransfer votes, 2nd round
Party	Candidate	Total	Of round	Transfers	Total	Of round	1st round votesTransfer votes, 2nd round
Conservative	Boris Johnson	1,043,761	43.2%	124,977	1,168,738	53.2%	
Labour	Ken Livingstone	893,887	37.0%	134,089	1,027,976	46.8%	
Liberal Democrats	Brian Paddick	235,585	9.8%				
Green	Siân Berry	77,347	3.2%				
BNP	Richard Barnbrook	69,710	3.2%				
CPA	Alan Craig	39,249	1.6%				
UKIP	Gerard Batten	22,422	1.2%				
Respect	Lindsey German	16,796	0.7%				
English Democrat	Matt O'Connor	10,695	0.4%				
Independent	Winston McKenzie	5,389	0.2%				
Conservative gain from Labour							

==== 2004 ====
In June 2004, the second election was held. After being re-admitted to the Labour Party, Ken Livingstone was their official candidate. He won re-election after second preference votes were counted, with Steven Norris again coming second.

Mayor of London election 10 June 2004
Party	Candidate	1st round		2nd round			1st round votesTransfer votes, 2nd round
Party	Candidate	Total	Of round	Transfers	Total	Of round	1st round votesTransfer votes, 2nd round
Labour	Ken Livingstone	685,548	36.8%	142,842	828,390	55.4%	
Conservative	Steven Norris	542,423	29.1%	124,757	667,180	44.6%	
Liberal Democrats	Simon Hughes	284,647	15.3%				
UKIP	Kellie Maloney	115,666	6.2%				
Respect	Lindsey German	61,731	3.3%				
BNP	Julian Leppert	58,407	3.1%				
Green	Darren Johnson	57,332	3.1%				
CPA	Ram Gidoomal	31,698	2.2%				
Ind. Working Class	Lorna Reid	9,452	0.5%				
Independent	Tammy Nagalingam	6,692	0.4%				
Labour gain from Independent							

==== 2000 ====
The 2000 campaign was incident-filled. The eventual winner, Ken Livingstone, reneged on an earlier pledge not to run as an independent, after losing the Labour nomination to Frank Dobson. The Conservative Party candidate, Jeffrey Archer, was replaced by Steven Norris after Archer was charged with perjury.

Mayor of London election 4 May 2000
Party	Candidate	1st round		2nd round			1st round votesTransfer votes, 2nd round
Party	Candidate	Total	Of round	Transfers	Total	Of round	1st round votesTransfer votes, 2nd round
Independent	Ken Livingstone	667,877	39.0%	108,540	776,417	57.9%	
Conservative	Steven Norris	464,434	27.1%	99,703	564,137	42.1%	
Labour	Frank Dobson	223,884	13.1%				
Liberal Democrats	Susan Kramer	203,452	11.9%				
CPA	Ram Gidoomal	43,060	2.4%				
Green	Darren Johnson	38,121	2.2%				
BNP	Michael Newland	33,569	2.0%				
UKIP	Damian Hockney	16,324	1.0%				
Pro-Motorist Small Shop	Geoffrey Ben-Nathan	9,956	0.6%				
Independent	Ashwin Tanna	9,015	0.5%				
Natural Law	Geoffrey Clements	5,470	0.3%				
Independent win							

== See also ==
- Elections in the United Kingdom
