= Rosamund Kissi-Debrah =

British environmental campaigner

Rosamund Adoo-Kissi-Debrah CBE
- Occupation: Teacher
- Known for: Activist against air pollution and awareness about asthma
- Political party: Green Party of England and Wales

Rosamund Adoo-Kissi-Debrah CBE is a British grassroots campaigner who raises awareness of asthma and the health problems that can be caused by air pollution. Her work followed the death of her nine-year-old daughter, Ella Roberta Adoo-Kissi-Debrah, which was eventually attributed to excessive air pollution from London's South Circular Road.

== Campaigning ==
Kissi-Debrah's campaign for clean air followed the death in 2013 of her nine-year-old daughter, Ella Roberta Adoo-Kissi-Debrah. Ella Roberta had experienced severe asthma attacks over several years, and the 2014 inquest reported only on Ella Roberta's medical care. Kissi-Debrah learned about the adverse health effects of air pollution, and campaigned for air pollution to be included on her child's death certificate. Her campaign led to a second inquest in 2020, where evidence about air pollution was considered, with the Record of Inquest finding: "Died of asthma contributed to by excessive air pollution". The subsequent Report to Prevent Future Deaths identified the South Circular Road, London as the source of pollution. The finding was covered in the media at the time. In 2023 Great Ormond Street Hospital started to add average air pollution data for patient's postcodes their files so that this could be considered during diagnosis and treatment, while recognising that it may not be possible for patients to change where they live, work or play. In January 2024, Kissi-Debrah began High Court legal action against three British government departments in an attempt to establish a legal right to clean air. In October 2024, she received an undisclosed sum from the UK government in settlement of this action.

Kissi-Debrah also co-founded the Ella Roberta Family Foundation to promote her goals more widely to the public and officials. This charity aims to improve the lives of children affected by asthma in South East London. It engages with politicians and policy makers as well as young people and communities to raise awareness of asthma, advocate for better medical treatment of asthma and also campaigns for clean air. Kissi-Debrah is the director.

She has worked with the office of the Mayor of London on the Healthy London Partnership and contributed to the 2023 expansion of the Ultra Low Emission Zone in London that aimed to reduce air pollution from cars. Low-traffic neighbourhoods (LTNs) have been introduced in London, partly to reduce air pollution. Kissi-Debrah has been drawn into the conflict between the potential for social and environmental benefits but also for damage from the diverted traffic flows. She has advocated for balance in reducing traffic and improving air quality. In a 2020 interview with The Observer, she said: "For people who live in an LTN, yes, life is better, I don't deny that, but their traffic is going somewhere. You cannot live in a neighbourhood where one part has an LTN and children are cycling and playing outside and the roads are safe, then pop along a couple of roads later and there's gridlocked traffic. We cannot live in a society like that."

Kissi-Debrah was a candidate in the 2018 Lewisham East by-election and the 2019 UK general election in the same constituency. She was also a candidate in the 2021 London Assembly election for the Green Party of England and Wales, finishing third in Greenwich and Lewisham.

She is a World Health Organization advocate for health and air quality.

Kissi-Debrah was one of the judges in the BLAC (Bright Lights Awards Ceremony) Awards in 2020.

== Electoral history ==
General election 2019: Lewisham East
Party	Candidate	Votes	%	±%
Labour	Janet Daby	26,661	59.5	▼8.5
Conservative	Sam Thurgood	9,653	21.5	▼1.5
Liberal Democrats	Ade Fatukasi	5,039	11.2	▲6.8
Green	Rosamund Adoo-Kissi-Debrah	1,706	3.8	▲2.1
Brexit Party	Wesley Pollard	1,234	2.8	N/A
CPA	Maureen Martin	277	0.6	▲0.1
Independent	Mark Barber	152	0.3	N/A
Young People's	Richard Galloway	50	0.1	N/A
Independent	Roger Mighton	43	0.1	N/A
Majority		17,008	38.0	▼6.9
Turnout		44,815	66.0	▼3.2
Registered electors		67,857		
Labour hold		Swing	▼3.5	

2018 Lewisham East by-election
Party	Candidate	Votes	%	±%
Labour	Janet Daby	11,033	50.2	▼17.7
Liberal Democrats	Lucy Salek	5,404	24.6	▲20.2
Conservative	Ross Archer	3,161	14.4	▼8.6
Green	Rosamund Adoo-Kissi-Debrah	788	3.6	▲1.9
Women's Equality	Mandu Reid	506	2.3	N/A
UKIP	David Kurten	380	1.7	▼0.1
For Britain	Anne Marie Waters	266	1.2	N/A
CPA	Maureen Martin	168	0.8	▲0.3
Monster Raving Loony	Howling Laud Hope	93	0.4	N/A
Democrats and Veterans	Massimo DiMambro	67	0.3	N/A
Libertarian	Sean Finch	38	0.2	N/A
Access to the Law for All	Charles Carey	37	0.2	N/A
Radical	Patrick Gray	20	0.1	N/A
Young People's	Thomas Hall	18	0.1	N/A
Majority		5,629	25.6	▼19.3
Turnout		22,056	33.3	▼36.1
Registered electors		66,140		
Labour hold		Swing	▼19.0	

== Personal life ==
Kissi-Debrah lives on the South Circular Road in London. She is a secondary school teacher in Lewisham.

== Honours and awards ==
In November 2020, she was included in the BBC Radio 4 Woman's Hour Power list 2020.

Kissi-Debrah was appointed Commander of the Order of the British Empire (CBE) in the 2023 New Year Honours for services to public health.

In 2024, a portrait of her by photographer Serena Brown was displayed in the National Portrait Gallery, London, who had won the 2023 Taylor Wessing commission.

In April 2025 a life-size bronze statue of her daughter Ella Roberta by sculptor Hannah Stewart was unveiled in Mountsfield Park, Catford, near where Ella Roberta was brought up.
