= 2021 London Assembly election =

- 6 May 2021

All 25 seats in the London Assembly 13 seats needed for a majority
- Turnout: 42.7% ▼2.9%
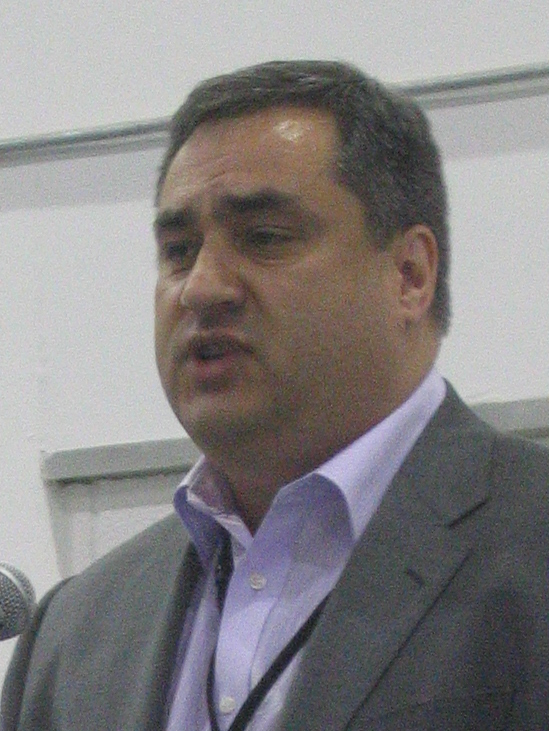

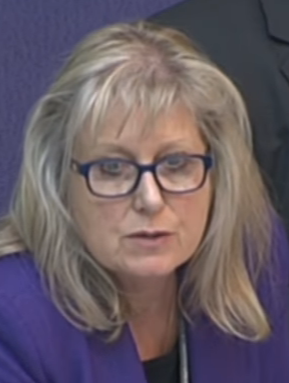

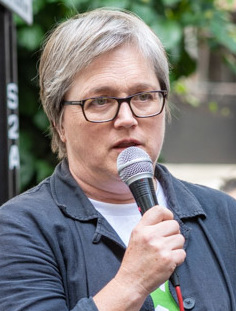

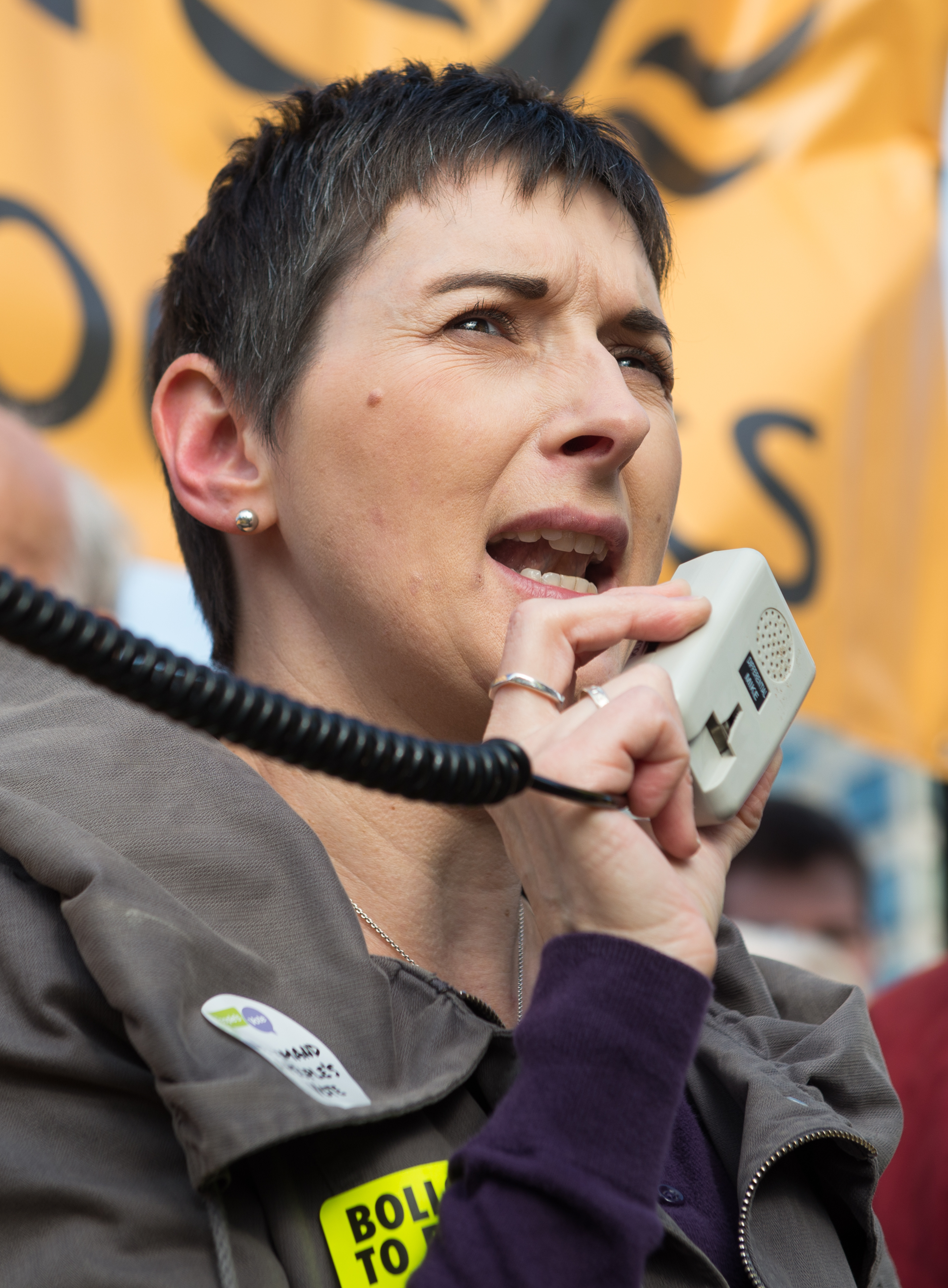
	First party	Second party
Leader	Len Duvall	Susan Hall
Party	Labour	Conservative
Leader's seat	Greenwich and Lewisham	Additional member
Last election	12 seats	8 seats
Seats won	11	9
Seat change	▼1	▲1
Constituency vote	1,083,215	833,021
% and swing	41.7% ▼1.8	32.0% ▲0.9
Party vote	986,609	795,081
% and swing	38.1% ▼2.2	30.7% ▲1.5
	Third party	Fourth party
Leader	Caroline Russell	Caroline Pidgeon
Party	Green	Liberal Democrats
Leader's seat	Additional member	Additional member
Last election	2 seats	1 seat
Seats won	3	2
Seat change	▲1	▲1
Constituency vote	336,840	266,595
% and swing	13.0% ▲3.9	10.3% ▲2.8
Party vote	305,452	189,622
% and swing	11.8% ▲3.8	7.3% ▲1.0

The 2021 London Assembly election was held on 6 May 2021 to elect the members of the London Assembly, alongside the 2021 London mayoral election. The mayoral and Assembly elections were originally to be held on 7 May 2020, but on 13 March 2020 it was announced the election would be postponed until 2021 due to the COVID-19 pandemic. It was the sixth election since the Assembly was established in 2000. Due to the previous term being extended to 5 years, those elected would only serve a three-year term until the next election in 2024. The election was held on the same day in 2021 as other elections in the UK; the UK local elections, Scottish Parliament election, and Welsh Senedd election.

Five parties had featured in the fifth Assembly: London Labour led by Len Duvall; London Conservatives led by Gareth Bacon and latterly Susan Hall; London Greens led by Caroline Russell; UKIP London represented by David Kurten (as part of the Brexit Alliance group led by its former leader Peter Whittle); and the London Liberal Democrats led by Caroline Pidgeon. This fell to four parties after the election, as UKIP lost both its seats.

== Background ==
=== 2016–2019 ===
In the 2016 local elections, the Labour Party won the post of London Mayor, as well as 12 seats in the London Assembly elections. The party polled over 1 million votes, which represented the best-ever result for any political party in a London Assembly election. The Conservative Party were the runners-up, winning 8 seats, followed by the Green Party (2 seats), the UK Independence Party (2 seats) and the Liberal Democrats (1 seat). The Women's Equality Party, meanwhile, achieved 3.5% of the regional list vote, failing to reach the 5% minimum threshold required for representation.

The following year, in the snap election on 8 June 2017, Labour polled 55% of the popular vote in London, winning 49 of 73 London seats in the British House of Commons. In the 2018 borough elections across the capital, Labour saw their best result in over 45 years, winning 47% of the vote. Both the Liberal Democrats and the Green party also gained seats across London.

UKIP Assembly Member Peter Whittle left the party in December 2018. He and the remaining UKIP Assembly Member David Kurten formed their own Brexit Alliance group on the Assembly. Kurten subsequently also left UKIP.

=== 2019 elections ===
In 2019, London was involved in two nationwide elections.

In the May 2019 European Parliament elections, the Liberal Democrats came first in London; winning the most votes in the London region with 27% and gaining three MEPs, their best result in the party's history. The Labour Party came second, with 24% of the vote, losing two seats. The Brexit Party gained two MEPs and Greens won 12.5% of the vote, holding their one seat. The Conservative Party failed to get a single MEP elected in London for the first time in the history of the party.

In the general election at the end of 2019, there was no net change in the number of seats for each party, although four constituencies in London changed hands. Across London, Labour comfortably won the most seats. Two members of the London Assembly were elected to Parliament: the Conservative group leader Gareth Bacon and Labour member Florence Eshalomi. Susan Hall replaced Bacon as Conservative group leader, and both Bacon and Eshalomi announced that they would not seek re-election at the 2020 London Assembly election.

== Electoral system ==
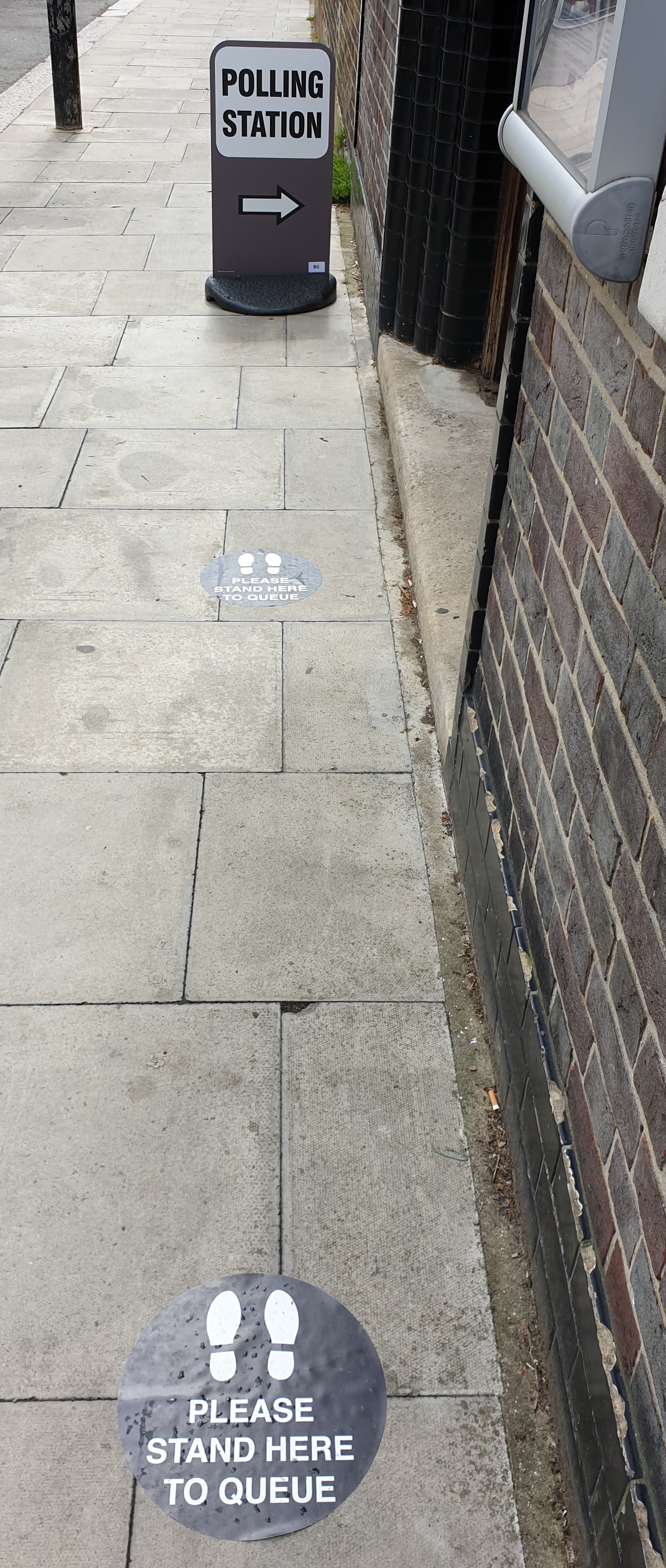
Social distancing measures outside a polling station in Highgate, London, 6 May 2021

The members of the Assembly are elected through a combination of both first past the post as well as closed list proportional representation; this system is commonly referred to as the additional member system. 14 members are elected in single member constituencies with the candidate receiving the largest number of votes becoming the Assembly Member for that constituency. An additional 11 members are also elected from the whole of London — with parties creating lists of up to 25 candidates — for a party to be included it needs to attain at least 5% of the vote across London. This process divides the remaining seats proportionally to the vote share of the parties with the use of the modified D'Hondt method allocating the seats. This system ensures proportionality with the 11 additional members being allocated in a corrective manner.

== Campaign ==
The London Labour Party changed its selection process for assembly members so that party members select new candidates. The party started an investigation into a dispute over a "trigger ballot" organised by Momentum members to deselect Florence Eshalomi, Assembly Member for Lambeth and Southwark.

The Conservatives intend to stand candidates. Their constituency candidate for the North East, Ben Seifert, stood down and joined the Lib Dems in 2019.

Nominations for the Green Party's list candidates closed in January 2019. Their final list was headed by their two current Assembly Members, Sian Berry (also the mayoral candidate) and Caroline Russell. The other three individuals who sought the mayoral nomination are also all Assembly candidates: Shahrar Ali (list candidate in 2016), Peter Underwood and former Liberal Democrat Zack Polanski. Other candidates include Benali Hamdache (list candidate in 2016; sought to be the Green mayoral candidate in 2016, losing to Berry).

The Liberal Democrats announced a shortlist of 15 people to be list candidates. These were voted on by the party membership, with the results announced in late November 2018. The candidate list was reshuffled in May 2019 following the withdrawal of Lucy Salek, originally placed third on the list.

== Candidates ==
Constituency candidates need to submit a deposit of £1,000, which is returned if they get 5% of the vote. A London-wide list requires a deposit of £5,000, returnable if the list gets 2.5% of the vote.

=== Constituency candidates ===
Constituency	Labour	Conservative	Green	Lib Dems	Reform UK	Others
Barnet & Camden	Anne Clarke (Note: New candidate for incumbent party) (75,180, 1st)	Roberto Weeden-Sanz (62,178, 2nd)	Kirsten de Keyser (Note: Also a candidate for the London-wide list) (22,180, 3rd)	Marisha Ray (14,172, 4th)	Mark Simpson (4,107, 5th)	
Bexley & Bromley	Stefano Borella (47,389, 2nd)	Peter Fortune (97,966, 1st)	Mary Ion (21,600, 3rd)	Alan Tweddle (13,305, 4th)	Michael Pastor (5,861, 5th)	
Brent & Harrow	Krupesh Hirani (77,782, 1st)	Molly Samuel-Leport (56,560, 2nd)	Emma Wallace (17,472, 3rd)	Anton Georgiou (14,783, 4th)	Ian Price (3,916, 5th)	
City & East	Unmesh Desai (Note: Incumbent seeking re-election) (125,025, 1st)	Nick Vandyke (46,718, 2nd)	Tim Kiely (25,596, 3rd)	Richard Flowers (14,136, 4th)	David Bull (9,060, 5th)	
Croydon & Sutton	Patsy Cummings (56,975, 2nd)	Neil Garratt (75,246, 1st)	Peter Underwood (18,069, 4th)	Claire Bonham (26,258, 3rd)	Robert Poll (3,190, 5th)	Renos Sampson (Let London Live) (2,021, 6th)
Ealing & Hillingdon	Onkar Sahota (85,216, 1st)	Gregory Stafford (76,974, 2nd)	Marijn van de Geer (22,620, 3rd)	Hussain Khan (16,435, 4th)	Anthony Goodwin (7,415, 5th)	
Enfield & Haringey	Joanne McCartney (81,620, 1st)	Lee David-Sanders (43,626, 2nd)	Jarelle Francis (21,921, 3rd)	Dawn Barnes (17,363, 4th)	Deborah Cairns (3,284, 5th)	Pamela Anne Holmes (Ind) (1,020, 6th)
Greenwich & Lewisham	Len Duvall (82,048, 1st)	Charlie Davis (38,889, 2nd)	Rosamund Kissi-Debrah (30,808, 3rd)	Chris Annous (12,744, 4th)	Edward Apostolides (3,689, 5th)	Tan Bui (Ind) (1,851, 6th)
Havering & Redbridge	Judith Garfield (61,941, 2nd)	Keith Prince (77,268, 1st)	Melanie Collins (13,685, 3rd)	Thomas Clarke (8,150, 4th)	Richard Tice (5,143, 5th)	Andy Walker (TUSC) (1,856, 6th)
Lambeth & Southwark	Marina Ahmad (91,949, 1st)	Hannah Ginnett (30,855, 3rd)	Claire Sheppard (36,933, 2nd)	Florence Cyrot (20,920, 4th)	John Cronin (3,917, 5th)	April Ashley (TUSC) (2,919, 6th)
Merton & Wandsworth	Leonie Cooper (75,468, 1st)	Louise Calland (60,968, 2nd)	Pippa Maslin (22,793, 3rd)	Sue Wixley (18,818, 4th)	Roger Gravett (3,080, 5th)	
North East	Sem Moema (112,739, 1st)	Emma Best (41,398, 3rd)	Caroline Russell (43,601, 2nd)	Kate Pothalingam (14,827, 4th)	Alex Wilson (4,251, 5th)	Nancy Taaffe (TUSC) (3,236, 6th)
South West	Candice Atterton (56,945, 3rd)	Nicholas Rogers (69,212, 1st)	Andrée Frieze (23,135, 4th)	Gareth Roberts (61,222, 2nd)	Dominique Day (3,396, 5th)	Sylvia Da Barca (Let London Live) (2,836, 6th)
West Central	Rita Begum (52,938, 2nd)	Tony Devenish (55,163, 1st)	Zack Polanski (16,427, 3rd)	Ted Townsend (13,462, 4th)	Saradhi Rajan (1,954, 6th)	Heiko Bernard Khoo (Let London Live) (1,977, 5th)
Source: London Elects

=== London-wide list candidates ===
2021 London Assembly election (London-wide)
List	Candidates	Votes	Of total (%)	± from prev.
Labour	Elly Baker (98,661), Sakina Sheikh (89,692), Murad Qureshi (82,217), Emine Ibrahim, Faduma Hassan, Sophie Charman-Blower, Bob Littlewood, Miriam Mirwitch, Shahina Jaffer, Taranjit Chana, James Beckles	986,609	38.1%	▼2.2%
Conservative	Shaun Bailey (Note: Stood as a mayoral candidate) (132,514), Andrew Boff (113,583), Susan Hall (99,385), Emma Best (88,342), Selina Seesunkur (79,508), Toby Williams, Ahmereen Reza, Timothy Briggs, Simon Hoar, John Riley, Julian Gallant, George Currie	795,081	30.7%	▲1.5%
Green	Siân Berry (305,452), Caroline Russell (152,726), Zack Polanski (101,817), Benali Hamdache (76,363), Shahrar Ali, Rosamund Kissi-Debrah, Ben Fletcher, Hannah Graham, Peter Underwood, Kirsten De Keyser, Jarelle Francis	305,452	11.8%	▲3.8%
Liberal Democrats	Caroline Pidgeon (189,522), Hina Bokhari (94,761), Rob Blackie (63,174), Chris Maines, Joyce Onstad, Irina von Wiese, Hussain Khan, Michael Bukola, Adrian Hyyrylainen-Trett, Adetokunbo Fatukasi, Charley Hasted	189,522	7.3%	▲1.0%
Women's Equality	Harini Iyengar, Jacueline Dean, Tabitha Morton, Rebecca Manson-Jones, Nikki Uppal, Pamela Ritchie, Leila Fazal, Sarabajaya Kumar, Guilene Marcor, Sellisha Lockyer, Korina Holmes, Maureen Obi-Ezekpazu, Georgina Ladbury	55,684	2.2%	▼1.3%
Rejoin EU	Richard Hewison, Deborah Iliffe, Charlotte Blake, John Stevens, Brendan Donnelly, Rory Fitzgerald, Benrd Rendic, Philipp Gnatzy, Karol Bobal, Raj Kumar, Javern Pond	49,389	1.9%	New
Animal Welfare	Vanessa Hudson, Sam Morland, Alex Bourke, Femy Amin, Mark Scott, Julian Weisman	44,667	1.7%	▲0.7%
CPA	Maureen Maud Marin, Helen Spiby-Vann, Ashley Keith Dickenson, Carol Valinejad, Eunice Oruyinka Ade Odesanmi, Katherine Susan Hortense, Desmond Coke, Donald Akhigbe	28,878	1.1%	▲0.1%
UKIP	Peter Gammons, Elizabeth Jones, Julie Carter, Stuart Freeman, Marjan Keqaj, Kakala Nyembwe, Ziz Kakoulakis, Geoffrey Courtenay, Anil Bhatti, Amir Latif, Simon Harman	27,114	1.0%	▼5.5%
Reform	Richard Tice, David Bull, Robert Poll, Dominique Day, Michael Pastor, Saradhi Rajan, Ian Price, Edward Apostolides, Mark Simpson, Michael Anthony, John Cronin	25,009	1.0%	New
London Real	Brian Rose, Paul Frost, Kim Murray, Julian Bailes	18,395	0.7%	New
Let London Live	Piers Corbyn, Heiko Khoo, Sylvia Da Barca, Julia Stephenson, Renos Samson	15,755	0.6%	New
Heritage	David Kurten, Sean Finch, Lewis Glyn, Zachary Stiling, Barbara Ray, Dominic Stockford	13,534	0.5%	New
TUSC	Nancy Taaffe, April Ashley, Lewis Baker, Deji Olayinka, Andrew Walker, Thea Everett, Lawanya Ramajayam, Jack Jeffery, Marvin Hay, Len Hockey, Lois Austin, Bob Law, Ferdy Lyons, Rachel Lyon, Naomi Bryan, Pete Mason, Angharad Hillier, Hugo Pierre, Brian Debus, Mira Glavardanov, Niall Mulholland, John Viner, Wally Kennedy, Paul Kershaw, Paul Scott	9,004	0.3%	New
Communist	Robin Talbot, Judith Cazorla Rodenas, Philip Wedgwood Brand, Akira Allman, Lorraine Douglas, Stewart McGill, Lucian Branescu-Mihaila, Anita Halpin, Hannah Sawtwell	8,787	0.3%	New
SDP	Eric Siva-Jothy, Stephen Gardner, Matthew Beresford, Simon Marshall, Brilant Krasniqi, Seth Liebowitz, Tricia Bracher, Rosamund Hubley	7,782	0.3%	New
Londependence	Bella Roberts, Tom Foster, Daniel Jacobs, John Halnan	5,746	0.2%	New
National Liberal	Upkar Rai, Arunasalam Rajalingam, Faisal Maramazi, Araz Yurdseven, Ponniah Yogaraja	2,860	0.1%	New

== Assembly members not standing for re-election ==
- Jennette Arnold, Chair of the London Assembly and Labour member for North East London
- Gareth Bacon, former Leader of the London Conservatives on the Assembly and the member for Bexley and Bromley, was elected to the House of Commons as MP for Orpington at the 2019 general election
- Tom Copley, Labour Assembly Member London-wide, was appointed Deputy Mayor of London for Housing
- Andrew Dismore, Labour's Assembly Member for Barnet and Camden
- Florence Eshalomi, Labour's Assembly Member for Lambeth and Southwark, was elected to the House of Commons as MP for Vauxhall in 2019
- Navin Shah, Labour's Assembly Member for Brent and Harrow
- Tony Arbour, Conservative Assembly Member for the South West constituency
- Steve O'Connell, Conservative Assembly Member for Croydon and Sutton constituency
- Alison Moore, Labour Assembly Member for London at-large
- Peter Whittle, Brexit Alliance Assembly Member for London at-large
- Nicky Gavron, Labour Assembly Member London-wide and Former Deputy Mayor of London

== Opinion polls ==
=== Constituency ===
Date(s) conducted	Pollster	Client	Sample size	Lab	Con	Green	Lib Dem	Others	Lead
2–4 May 2021	YouGov	N/A	1,141	43%	30%	13%	9%	5% Reform UK on 2% Other on 3%	13%
29 Mar – 1 Apr 2021	YouGov	Queen Mary University of London	1,192	46%	29%	8%	12%	5% Reform UK on 3% Other on 2%	17%
16–19 Nov 2020	YouGov	Queen Mary University of London	1,192	50%	30%	9%	8%	5% Reform UK on 3% Other on 1%	20%
2–6 Mar 2020	YouGov	Queen Mary University of London	1,002	47%	31%	9%	11%	– (Note: Brexit Party: 2%)	16%
5 May 2016	2016 Assembly election		—	43.5%	31.1%	9.1%	7.5%	8.8%	12.4%

=== London wide vote ===
Date(s) conducted	Pollster	Client	Sample size	Lab	Con	Green	Lib Dem	Others	Lead
2–4 May 2021	YouGov	N/A	1,141	41%	31%	15%	8%	5% Reform UK on 2% Other on 3%	10%
29 Mar – 1 Apr 2021	YouGov	Queen Mary University of London	1,192	44%	29%	11%	11%	5% Reform UK on 3% Other on 2%	15%
16–19 Nov 2020	YouGov	Queen Mary University of London	1,192	49%	29%	10%	7%	5% Reform UK on 3% Other on 1%	17%
2–6 Mar 2020	YouGov	Queen Mary University of London	1,002	45%	29%	12%	10%	–	16%
5 May 2016	2016 Assembly election		—	40.3%	29.2%	8.0%	6.3%	16.2%	11.1%

== Results ==
Party	Constituency			Regional			Total seats	+/–
Party	Votes	%	Seats	Votes	%	Seats	Total seats	+/–
Labour	1,083,215	41.67	9	986,609	38.10	2	11	−1
Conservative	833,021	32.04	5	795,081	30.71	4	9	+1
Green	336,840	12.96	0	305,452	11.80	3	3	+1
Liberal Democrats	266,595	10.26	0	189,522	7.32	2	2	+1
Women's Equality				55,684	2.15	0	0	0
Rejoin EU				49,389	1.91	0	0	New
Animal Welfare				44,667	1.73	0	0	0
Christian Peoples Alliance				28,878	1.12	0	0	0
UK Independence Party				27,114	1.05	0	0	−2
Reform UK	62,263	2.40	0	25,009	0.97	0	0	New
London Real				18,395	0.71	0	0	New
Let London Live	6,834	0.26	0	15,755	0.61	0	0	New
Heritage				13,534	0.52	0	0	New
TUSC	8,011	0.31	0	9,004	0.35	0	0	New
Communist Party of Britain				8,787	0.34	0	0	New
Social Democratic				7,782	0.30	0	0	New
Londependence				5,746	0.22	0	0	New
National Liberal				2,860	0.11	0	0	New
Independent	2,871	0.11	0				0	New
Total	2,599,650	100.00	14	2,589,268	100.00	11	25	0
Valid votes	2,599,650	98.33		2,589,268	97.92			
Invalid/blank votes	44,058	1.67		54,931	2.08			
Total votes	2,643,708	100.00		2,644,199	100.00			
Registered voters/turnout	6,191,387	42.70		6,191,387	42.71			
Source: London Elects

=== Analysis ===
In the regional vote, the Greens saw the largest vote increase, up 3.8 percentage points to gain 1 seat, while UKIP suffered the largest fall - down 5.4 percentage points and losing both their seats.

== See also ==
- London Assembly constituencies
