= 2019 Tameside Metropolitan Borough Council election =

2019 local election in England

Results of the 2019 Tameside Metropolitan Borough Council election

The 2019 Tameside Metropolitan Borough Council election took place on 2 May 2019 to elect members of Tameside Metropolitan Borough Council in England. This was on the same day as other local elections in England and Northern Ireland.

== Overall results ==
2019 Tameside Metropolitan Borough Council election
Party	This election			Full council			This election		
Party	Seats	Net	Seats %	Other	Total	Total %	Votes	Votes %	+/−
Labour	17	Steady	89.4	34	51	89.5	20,808	46.2	
Conservative	1	▼1	5.3	4	5	8.8	11,264	25.0	
Green	1	▲1	5.3	0	1	1.8	7,362	16.4	
UKIP	0	Steady	0.0	0	0	0.0	1,976	4.4	
Stalybridge Town Party	0	Steady	0.0	0	0	0.0	1,364	3.0	
Independent	0	Steady	0.0	0	0	0.0	1,095	2.4	
Liberal Democrats	0	Steady	0.0	0	0	0.0	706	1.6	
Democrats and Veterans	0	Steady	0.0	0	0	0.0	236	0.5	
Monster Raving Loony	0	Steady	0.0	0	0	0.0	181	0.4	

== Ward results ==
=== Ashton Hurst ===
Ashton Hurst
Party	Candidate	Votes	%	±%
Labour	Mike Glover	1,062	42.9	
Conservative	Therese Costello	942	38.0	
Green	Lorraine Whitehead	472	19.1	
Majority				
Turnout		2,476	27.8	
Labour hold		Swing		

=== Ashton St. Michael's ===
Ashton St. Michael's
Party	Candidate	Votes	%	±%
Labour	Yvonne Cartey	1,091	56.0	
Green	Philip Blakeney	451	23.1	
Conservative	Karen Brooks	407	20.9	
Majority				
Turnout		1,949	21.7	
Labour hold		Swing		

=== Ashton Waterloo ===
Ashton Waterloo
Party	Candidate	Votes	%	±%
Green	Lee Huntbach	1,073	45.5	
Labour	Jean Drennan	935	39.7	
Conservative	Irene Marsh	350	14.8	
Majority				
Turnout		2,358	26.9	
Green gain from Labour		Swing		

=== Audenshaw ===
Audenshaw
Party	Candidate	Votes	%	±%
Labour	Charlotte Martin	1,221	47.3	
Conservative	Danny Mather	798	30.9	
UKIP	Peter Harris	561	21.7	
Majority				
Turnout		2,580	26.7	
Labour hold		Swing		

=== Denton North East ===
Denton North East
Party	Candidate	Votes	%	±%
Labour	Allison Gwynne	1,064	53.8	
Conservative	Dawn Cobb	554	28.0	
Green	Benjamin Hart	360	18.2	
Majority				
Turnout		1,978	23.0	
Labour hold		Swing		

=== Denton South ===
Denton South
Party	Candidate	Votes	%	±%
Labour	Jack Naylor	1,433	66.1	
Conservative	Aimee Lumley	380	17.5	
Monster Raving Loony	Farmin Lord F'Tang F'Tang Dave	181	8.3	
Green	Jean Smee	174	8.0	
Majority				
Turnout		2,168	25.7	
Labour hold		Swing		

=== Denton West ===
Denton West
Party	Candidate	Votes	%	±%
Labour	Brenda Warrington	1,440	58.7	
Conservative	Thomas Dunne	550	22.4	
Green	Daniel Spence	462	18.8	
Majority				
Turnout		2,452	25.8	
Labour hold		Swing		

=== Droylsden East ===
Droylsden East
Party	Candidate	Votes	%	±%
Labour	Laura Boyle	1,001	47.2	
Conservative	Matthew Stevenson	605	28.5	
Green	Hannah Smee	514	24.2	
Majority				
Turnout		2,120	23.1	
Labour hold		Swing		

=== Droylsden West ===
Droylsden West
Party	Candidate	Votes	%	±%
Labour	Ann Holland	1,061	45.3	
UKIP	Maurice Jackson	570	24.4	
Green	Annie Train	432	18.5	
Conservative	Dot Buckley	277	11.8	
Majority				
Turnout		2,340	25.9	
Labour hold		Swing		

=== Dukinfield ===
Dukinfield
Party	Candidate	Votes	%	±%
Labour	John Taylor	1,039	47.4	
Green	Julie Wood	700	31.9	
Conservative	Lucy Turner	453	20.7	
Majority				
Turnout		2,192	23.1	
Labour hold		Swing		

=== Dukinfield/Stalybridge ===
Dukinfield/Stalybridge
Party	Candidate	Votes	%	±%
Labour	David Sweeton	920	38.5	
Stalybridge Town Party	Dave McGovern	680	28.4	
Conservative	Les Browning	388	16.2	
Green	Linda Freeman	251	10.5	
Independent	Dave Tate	153	6.4	
Majority				
Turnout		2,392	27.1	
Labour hold		Swing		

=== Hyde Godley ===
Hyde Godley
Party	Candidate	Votes	%	±%
Labour	Betty Affleck	1,004	42.4	
Conservative	Andrea Colbourne	720	30.4	
UKIP	Dawn Sheridan	335	14.2	
Green	Keith Whitehead	193	8.2	
Liberal Democrats	Alice Mason-Power	115	4.9	
Majority				
Turnout		2,367	25.5	
Labour hold		Swing		

=== Hyde Newton ===
Hyde Newton
Party	Candidate	Votes	%	±%
Labour	Helen Bowden	1,147	48.5	
Conservative	Michael Gibbins	547	23.1	
Green	Michael Baker	425	18.0	
Liberal Democrats	Peter Ball-Foster	245	10.4	
Majority				
Turnout		2,364	22.1	
Labour hold		Swing		

=== Hyde Werneth ===
Hyde Werneth
Party	Candidate	Votes	%	±%
Labour	Shibley Alam	1,473	42.5	
Conservative	Paul Molloy	1,468	42.3	
Green	Ian Robinson	322	9.3	
Liberal Democrats	Richard O'Brien	206	5.9	
Majority				
Turnout		3,469	38.3	
Labour gain from Conservative		Swing		

=== Longdendale ===
Longdendale
Party	Candidate	Votes	%	±%
Labour	Jacqueline Owen	840	41.3	
Conservative	Ben Frost	498	24.5	
Green	Irene Brierley	321	15.8	
Democrats and Veterans	Graham Doherty	236	11.6	
Liberal Democrats	Lynne Thompson	140	6.9	
Majority				
Turnout		2,035	25.7	
Labour hold		Swing		

=== Mossley ===
Mossley
Party	Candidate	Votes	%	±%
Labour	Tafheen Sharif	1,115	44.2	
Independent	Dean Aylett	736	29.2	
Green	Christine Clark	374	14.8	
Conservative	Daniel Percival	296	11.7	
Majority				
Turnout		2,521	28.1	
Labour hold		Swing		

=== St. Peter's ===
St. Peter's
Party	Candidate	Votes	%	±%
Labour	David McNally	1,505	68.2	
Green	Trevor Clarke	414	18.8	
Conservative	Matt Allen	287	13.0	
Majority				
Turnout		2,206	23.1	
Labour hold		Swing		

=== Stalybridge North ===
Stalybridge North
Party	Candidate	Votes	%	±%
Labour	Adrian Pearce	759	31.9	
Stalybridge Town Party	Lee Stafford	684	28.8	
Conservative	David Tilbrook	541	22.7	
UKIP	Josh Hughes	250	10.5	
Green	David Fernley	145	6.1	
Majority				
Turnout		2,379	25.0	
Labour hold		Swing		

=== Stalybridge South ===
Stalybridge South
Party	Candidate	Votes	%	±%
Conservative	Clive Patrick	1,203	45.5	
Labour	Hugh Roderick	698	26.4	
Green	Amanda Hickling	279	10.5	
UKIP	Kerri Luke	260	9.8	
Independent	Jennifer Brayne	206	7.8	
Majority				
Turnout		2,646	30.2	
Conservative hold		Swing		
