= Heritage Party (UK) =

- Leader: David Kurten
- Founder: David Kurten
- Founded: 21 October 2020; 6 years ago
- Split from: UK Independence Party
- Ideology: Euroscepticism; British nationalism; British unionism; Right-wing populism; Social conservatism
- Political position: Right-wing
- Slogan: "Freedom, Family, Nation"

Website
- heritageparty.org

The Heritage Party is a right-wing political party in the United Kingdom, founded in October 2020 when then-London Assembly Member David Kurten left the UK Independence Party (UKIP) to form the party. Kurten was also a member of the Brexit Alliance, a Eurosceptic technical group he formed in 2018 with fellow former UKIP member Peter Whittle.

== History ==
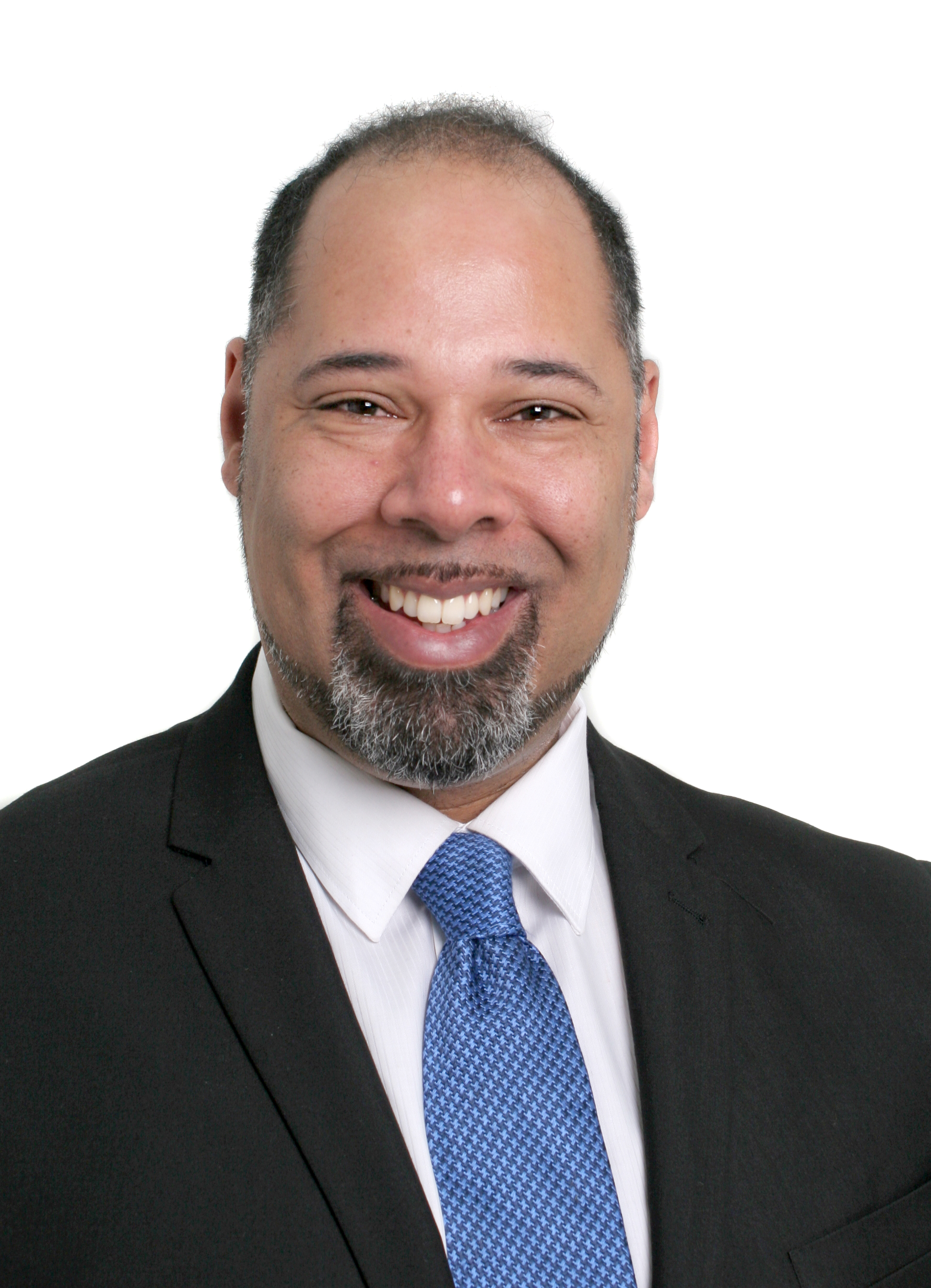
David Kurten, founder and leader of the Heritage Party

In January 2020, Kurten announced he would be running as an independent candidate in the upcoming London mayoral and London Assembly elections (then scheduled for May 2020, but both elections were postponed to 2021 due to the COVID-19 pandemic). Kurten founded the Heritage Party, and it was registered with the Electoral Commission that October.

In December 2020, Kurten rejected a COVID-19 vaccine, for which he was denounced by Conservative mayoral candidate Shaun Bailey, who saw this as irresponsible for an elected politician. Lockdowns in response to the coronavirus pandemic in the United Kingdom were condemned by Kurten.

In March 2025, the party gained representation in local government, when Becki Bruneau, a Kent County Councillor for Tunbridge Wells, defected from the Conservatives.

== Elections ==
=== Parliamentary by-elections ===
The party has stood in eight by-elections so far:

By-election	Candidate	Votes	Turnout	Percentage	Place	Candidates	Notes	References
2021 Hartlepool by-election	Claire Martin	468	29,933	1.6	4th	16		
2021 Batley and Spen by-election	Susan Laird	33	37,786	0.1	16th	16		
2021 Old Bexley and Sidcup by-election	David Kurten	116	21,733	0.5	9th	11		
2021 North Shropshire by-election	James Elliot	79	38,093	0.2	10th	14		
2022 Southend West by-election	Ben Downton	236	15,942	1.6	6th	9	Held due to the murder of previous MP David Amess on 15 October 2021. The major parties thus did not stand.	
2022 Tiverton and Honiton by-election	Jordan Donoghue-Morgan	167	42,707	0.4	7th	8		
2023 Selby and Ainsty by-election	Guy Phoenix	162	35,886	0.5	10th	13		
2023 Mid Bedfordshire by-election	Alberto Thomas	63	40,720	0.5	11th	13		

=== 2021 elections ===
==== May 2021 London elections ====
Kurten came 15th in the 2021 London mayoral election with 0.4% of the vote. Heritage came 13th in the Assembly election with 0.5% of the vote. In addition to his Mayoral loss, Kurten lost his seat in the Assembly (to which he had been elected second on the UKIP list at the 2016 election).

==== London Assembly ====
Election	Votes	Share of votes	Seats	Note(s)
2021	13,534	0.52%	0 / 25	#13

=== 2022 Northern Ireland Assembly ===
Election	First Preference Vote	Share of votes	Seats	Note(s)
2022	128	0.0%	0 / 90	#16

=== 2023 UK local elections ===
Council	Candidates	Elected	Votes	Percentage
Bournemouth, Christchurch and Poole	1 / 76	0 / 76	181	0.1
Tonbridge and Malling	1 / 44	0 / 44	77	0.1
South Staffordshire	1 / 42	0 / 42	86	0.4

=== 2024 elections ===
==== UK local elections ====
Council	Candidates	Elected	Votes	Percentage
West Oxfordshire	1 / 17	0 / 17	99	0.1

==== London Assembly ====
Election	Votes	Share of votes	Seats	Note(s)
2024	4,431	0.18%	0 / 25	#14

==== General election ====
The party's candidates stood in 41 constituencies in the 2024 United Kingdom general election on 4 July 2024: 34 in England, 1 in Scotland, 6 in Wales. These candidates received a total of 6,597 votes, and none of them were elected.

Election year	Leader	# of total votes	% of overall vote	Candidates	# of seats won	Outcome
2024	David Kurten	6,597 ▲	0.0% ▲	41 / 650	0 / 650	No seats

=== 2026 elections ===
The Heritage Party stood 18 candidates across 13 local authorities in England's local elections, 4 candidates in the South Scotland electoral region for the Scottish parliamentary election and 1 candidate in every Senedd constituency (with 2 in Afan Ogwr Rhondda) for the Senedd election. These candidates received a total of 5,474 votes, and none of them were elected.
