= 2018 Lewisham East by-election =

2018 UK parliament by-election

- 14 June 2018

Lewisham East constituency
- Turnout: 33.3%
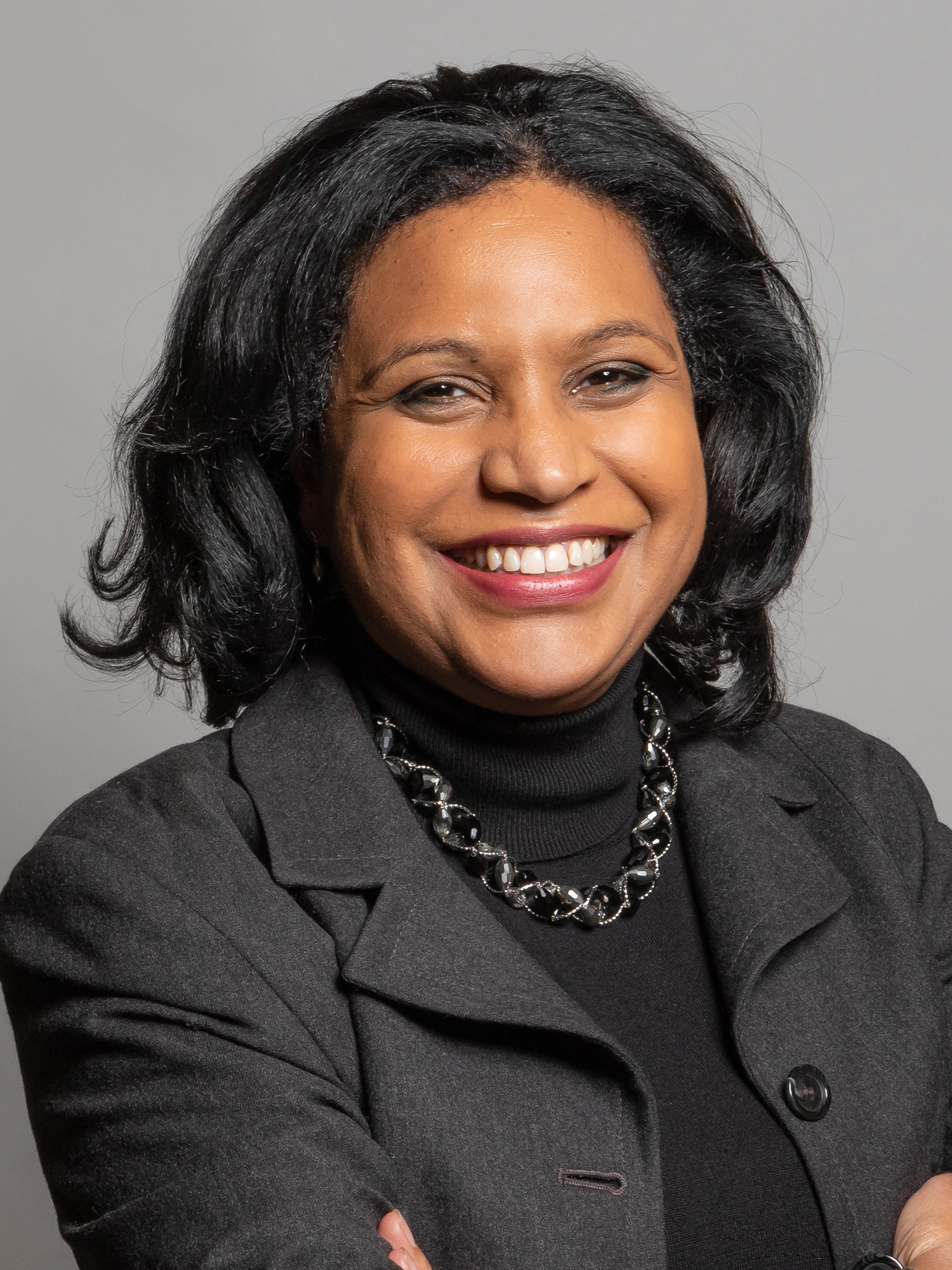
	First party	Second party	Third party
		LD	Con
Candidate	Janet Daby	Lucy Salek	Ross Archer
Party	Labour	Liberal Democrats	Conservative
Popular vote	11,033	5,404	3,168
Percentage	50.2%	24.6%	14.4%
Swing	▼17.7 pp	▲20.2 pp	▼8.6 pp
MP before election
Heidi Alexander
Labour
Elected MP
Janet Daby
Labour

A by-election for the United Kingdom parliamentary constituency of Lewisham East was held on 14 June 2018, following the resignation of incumbent Labour Party MP Heidi Alexander. It won by Janet Daby of the Labour with 50.2% of the vote, on a significantly reduced majority for her party.

== Background ==
On 8 May 2018, the incumbent Labour MP Heidi Alexander announced her appointment as London Deputy Mayor for Transport, a role that required her to stand down from the House of Commons. On 9 May she was appointed Crown Steward and Bailiff of the Manor of Northstead, an office of profit under the Crown, which legally formalised her resignation from Parliament. She served as the MP for Lewisham East for eight years, having first been elected at the 2010 general election. She served in Labour's Shadow Cabinet until 2016, and was an active campaigner for the United Kingdom to remain in the European single market after Brexit. She had been critical of Labour's leadership, describing it as "dysfunctional".

The Lewisham East constituency had been represented by MPs from the Labour Party since 1992, and was considered a safe seat for the party. The constituency was within the London Borough of Lewisham, in which the Labour Party won every single seat at the local elections in 2018. The seat had an active branch of Momentum, a left-wing pressure group dedicated to supporting the leadership of Jeremy Corbyn. Lewisham London Borough Council administered the by-election.

In the 2016 referendum, the Borough of Lewisham, of which the constituency is a part, voted to remain in the European Union. Through demographic modelling, the Remain vote in the Lewisham East constituency was estimated as 66% by Number Cruncher Politics and as 65% by Chris Hanretty at Royal Holloway.

== Candidates ==
The Labour Party selected Lewisham deputy mayor nominee Janet Daby as its candidate. She had a background in social care and managed a food poverty charity. The Conservative Party selected Ross Archer, who contested the borough mayoralty in May 2018. His campaign was focused on housing, education, policing and the zoning of Grove Park railway station. The Liberal Democrats announced their candidate as Lucy Salek, a humanitarian worker and consultant who had stood in Lewisham Council elections, and contested Southend West in the 2017 general election. They intended to use the by-election to "send a message to the Labour leadership about Brexit", with party leader Vince Cable aiming to "cut the majority substantially".

The Green Party's candidate was secondary school teacher and clean air campaigner Rosamund Kissi-Debrah. She stood on a platform of reducing air pollution, improving local schools and for British people to "have a final say on Europe". The UK Independence Party (UKIP) announced on 14 May that London Assembly Member David Kurten would stand as its candidate. He pledged to campaign for "full Brexit" and for a "tough stance on policing and crime". For Britain announced on 12 May that party leader Anne Marie Waters would stand. In the 2015 general election Waters stood as the UKIP candidate for Lewisham East and polled in third place. The Women's Equality Party announced on 17 May its intention to stand Mandu Reid, a Lewisham resident and founder of The Cup Effect, a women's menstrual health NGO. Democrats and Veterans announced that Massimo DiMambro, who was the UKIP candidate in Lewisham Deptford in the 2015 general election, would be their candidate. The Official Monster Raving Loony Party announced that its leader, Howling Laud Hope, would be its candidate.

=== Labour Party selection process ===
The Labour selection was reported in the media as revealing splits in the Labour Party. This was the first by-election contested by the party since Jennie Formby took over as general secretary, which led to speculation that centrist candidates might be excluded. The Lewisham East Labour Left caucus group called for a socialist MP who would "campaign for...a left-wing government with Jeremy Corbyn as Prime Minister". On 10 May 2018, Ian McKenzie, chair of the Constituency Labour Party (CLP), emailed members concerned that the National Executive Committee (NEC) was rushing the selection to prevent them having their say.

Potential left-wing candidates included Sakina Sheikh, GMB trade union organiser Nadine Houghton, and NEC member Claudia Webbe. Other potential candidates were Joe Dromey (son of Labour MPs Harriet Harman and Jack Dromey), and Kevin Bonavia. UK Black Pride founder Phyll Opoku-Gyimah was also considered a potential candidate, especially in the event of an all-woman and entirely black and minority ethnic shortlist, but ruled herself out on 13 May, citing an "unexpected situation" in her family. Members who declared that they would stand included Sheikh, Bonavia, and Brenda Dacres.

On 14 May the NEC announced a shortlist of Webbe, Dacres, Lewisham councillor Janet Daby and Sheikh, all women from ethnic minorities. McKenzie was said to be delighted by the inclusion of Dacres and Daby. Sheikh received the endorsement of Momentum, whilst Webbe was endorsed by the trade unions Unite and the Communication Workers Union. Daby received the support of Unison. Dacres withdrew on 18 May and endorsed Daby, citing "recently diagnosed health reasons". The remaining candidates expressed differing views over Brexit, with Daby pledging to fight for the UK to remain in the customs union and the single market, whilst Sheikh and Webbe expressed their opposition to a second referendum or continued membership of the single market.

Sheikh was temporarily withdrawn from the ballot prior to the selection meeting, following accusations that she had supported a rival political organisation, but was reinstated minutes later. Daby went on to be selected by local members on 19 May, receiving 63% of the vote in the first round, with Sheikh receiving 29% and Webbe 8%.

== Campaign ==
On 22 May, McKenzie, credited with having secured the Labour candidature for Daby which he claimed had "humiliated" Momentum and Unite, was suspended as chair of the CLP and is facing possible disciplinary action over tweets from 2015 and 2016 about Emily Thornberry and ISIS. These were uncovered by left-wing writer Owen Jones, who McKenzie had suggested should keep away from the constituency.

The Liberal Democrats announced their opposition to plans by Lewisham Council to seize the land of Millwall FC's youth academy for redevelopment. Party leader Vince Cable visited the academy in late May; the party's candidate, Lucy Salek, announced that the land should be used for social housing if the redevelopment plans went ahead.

A UKIP leaflet titled 'Stop the Khanage', which blamed the high levels of knife crime in London on the Labour Mayor of London, Sadiq Khan, was criticised by Vicky Foxcroft, the MP for the neighbouring constituency of Lewisham Deptford, and Mandu Reid, the WEP candidate in the by-election.

On 11 June 2018, three days before the by-election, a vote estimate by the Liberal Democrats on the basis of canvassing data suggested that the party would finish second with 25% of the vote, with Labour on 49% and the Conservatives on 16%.

On 12 June 2018, police shut down a by-election hustings in Catford, leading to one arrest, after it was disrupted by anti-racism protesters led by Stand Up to Racism and Lewisham Anti-Racist Action Group. The protesters intended to target Anne Marie Waters, who did not attend the event on police advice. Daby and Archer were also absent from the hustings, citing other engagements; Daby had previously refused to share a platform with Waters. The protest was criticised by Salek and Reid. Prior to the event, Foxcroft and Damien Egan, the Mayor of Lewisham, had called for Waters to be No Platformed at the hustings.

== Result ==
Bar chart of the election result.

Lewisham East by-election, 2018
Party	Candidate	Votes	%	±%
Labour	Janet Daby	11,033	50.2	–17.7
Liberal Democrats	Lucy Salek	5,404	24.6	+20.2
Conservative	Ross Archer	3,161	14.4	–8.6
Green	Rosamund Kissi-Debrah	788	3.6	+1.9
Women's Equality	Mandu Reid	506	2.3	New
UKIP	David Kurten	380	1.7	0.0
For Britain	Anne Marie Waters	266	1.2	New
CPA	Maureen Martin	168	0.8	+0.3
Monster Raving Loony	Howling Laud Hope	93	0.4	New
Democrats and Veterans	Massimo DiMambro	67	0.3	New
Libertarian	Sean Finch	38	0.2	New
No description	Charles Carey	37	0.2	New
Radical Party	Patrick Gray	20	0.1	New
Young People's	Thomas Hall	18	0.1	New
Majority		5,629	25.6	–19.3
Turnout		22,056	33.3	–36.1
Registered electors		66,140		
Labour hold		Swing	–19.0	

The result was the largest swing from Labour to the Liberal Democrats since 2004. The Liberal Democrat leader Vince Cable said: "This result sends a message to the Labour leadership that it cannot take pro-European voters for granted." The Guardian and Evening Standard reported the result as a "surge" for the Liberal Democrats, which was widely reported as being related to the party's opposition to Brexit. After being elected, Daby reaffirmed her opposition to a "hard" Brexit.

== Previous result ==
Heidi Alexander was re-elected to a third term of office in 2017, with an increased majority of 21,123 (44.8%) over the Conservative candidate.

General election 2017: Lewisham East
Party	Candidate	Votes	%	±%
Labour	Heidi Alexander	32,072	67.9	+12.3
Conservative	Peter Fortune	10,859	23.0	+0.7
Liberal Democrats	Emily Frith	2,086	4.4	–1.3
Green	Störm Poorun	803	1.7	–4.0
UKIP	Keith Forster	798	1.7	–7.4
Independent	Willow Winston	355	0.7	New
CPA	Maureen Martin	228	0.4	–0.2
Majority		21,123	44.8	+11.4
Turnout		47,201	69.3	+5.2
Registered electors		68,124		
Labour hold		Swing	+5.8	
