= Brexit Alliance =

- Leader: Peter Whittle; David Kurten
- Founded: 12 December 2018
- Dissolved: 6 May 2021
- Ideology: British nationalism Conservatism; Euroscepticism
- Political position: Right-wing

Website
- www.brexitalliancegroupgla.uk

The Brexit Alliance was a British political technical group formed on 12 December 2018 by Peter Whittle and David Kurten. They were elected to the London Assembly in 2016 as UK Independence Party (UKIP) representatives, but when Whittle announced he was leaving the party, the new group was formed. This was because to qualify as a group on the Assembly, at least two members are needed.

Kurten subsequently also left UKIP in January 2020 while remaining in the Brexit Alliance.

The Brexit Alliance lost both seats they held on the London Assembly at the 2021 London Assembly election.
