= Elly Baker =

British politician

Elly Baker AM
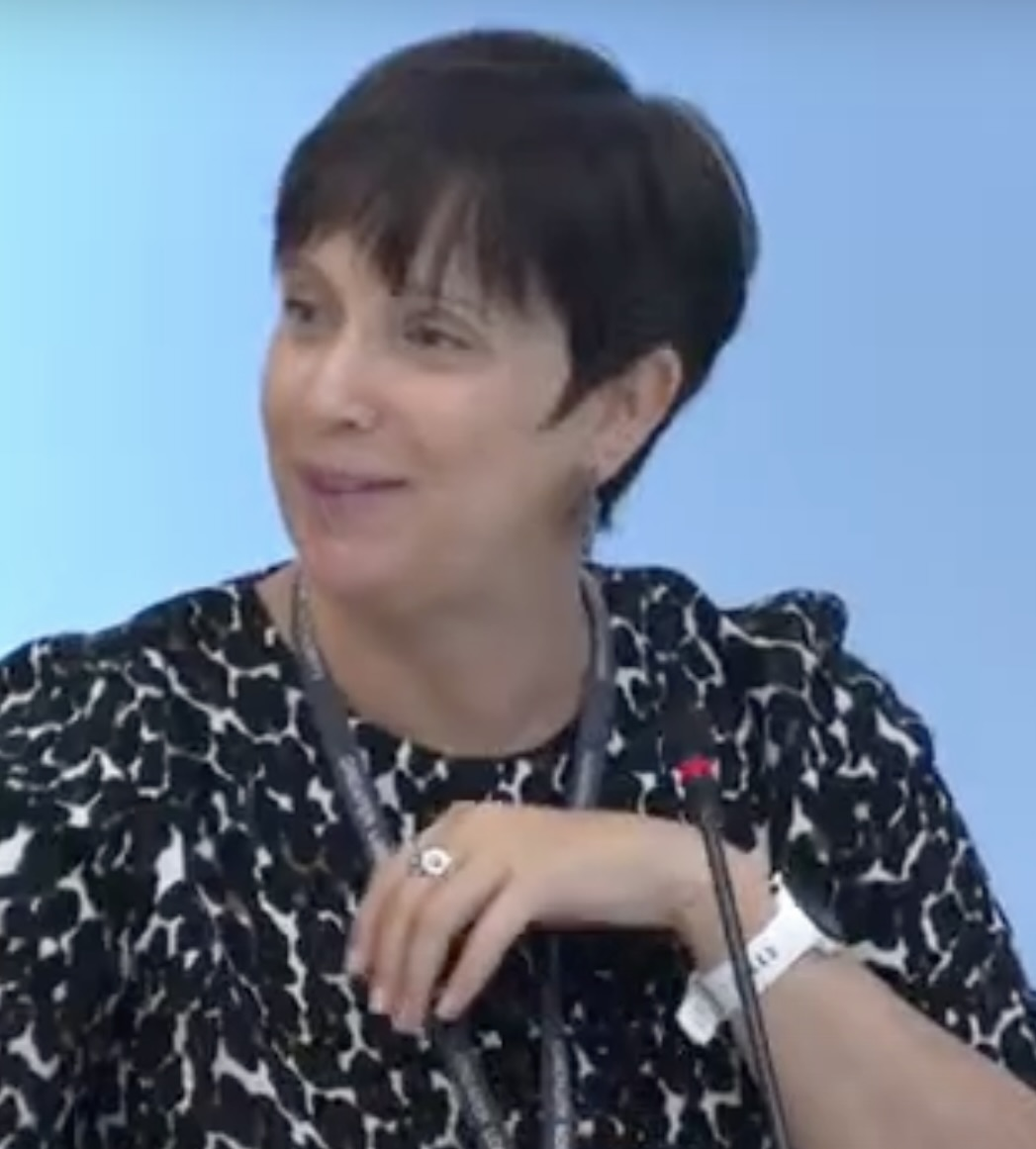
- Baker in 2024

Member of the London Assembly as an additional member
- Incumbent
- Assumed office 6 May 2021

Personal details
- Party: Labour and Co-op
- Website: ellybaker.org.uk

Eleanor Anna "Elly" Baker (born April 1977) is a British Labour Party politician who has been a Member of the London Assembly (AM) as an additional member since 2021. She worked as an organiser for the National Education Union.

== Early life ==
Baker grew up in East London and was educated in Hackney.

== London Assembly ==
For Baker's nomination as a Labour candidate for the London Assembly, she received endorsements from Sam Tarry, GMB, Fire Brigades Union, BFAWU, ASLEF, Communication Workers Union and Unite the Union.

Baker was elected to the London Assembly in 2021 and was subsequently re-elected in 2024.

She is the Labour group spokesperson on Transport. During her time on the London Assembly, Baker has successfully campaigned against the closure of train ticket offices in London. She has supported a new concession fare on TfL for care leaves between 18 and 25, which will support 16,000 London who have left state care to build independent lives without the support of a family.

Baker is a strong supporter of HS2, criticising the Government for cancelling the northern leg of the project, and for the construction of Crossrail 2 in London after the success of Crossrail 1.

Assembly Member Baker has used her platform to advocate for public ownership of train services, condemning the poor performance record of Train Operating Companies that serve London in comparison to those run by TfL.

As well as her campaigning on transport, Assembly Member Baker has supported the campaign to save the English National Opera and LGBT+ venue Bethnal Green Working Men's Club in East London.

In 2026, the London Assembly Oversight Committee appointed Baker as a rapporteur to investigate how tenants and residents associations were listening to tenants' feedback.
