= Janet Daby =

British Labour politician (born 1970)

Janet Daby MP
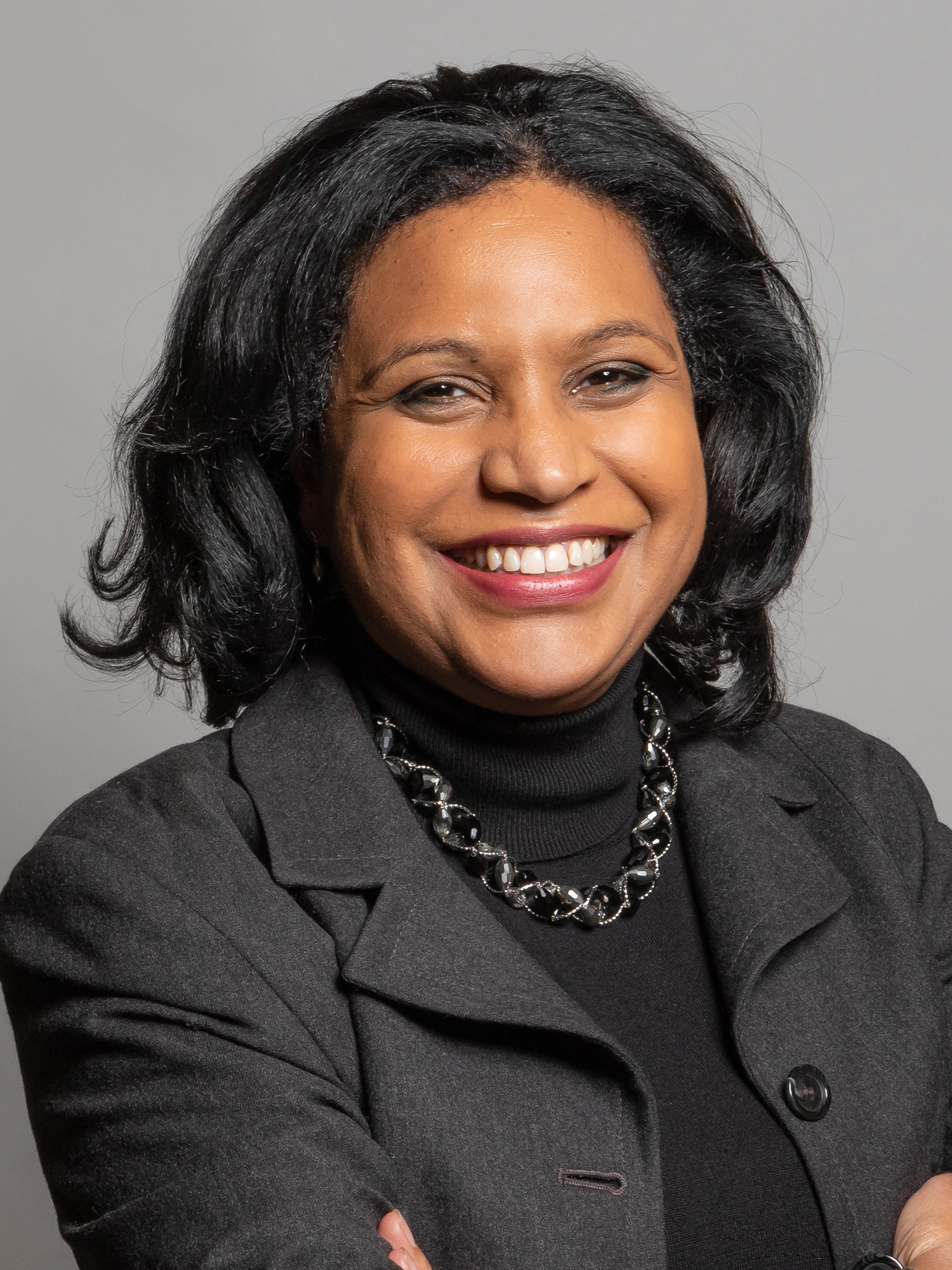
- Official portrait, 2020

Parliamentary Under-Secretary of State for Children and Families
- In office 9 July 2024 – 7 September 2025
- Prime Minister: Keir Starmer
- Preceded by: David Johnston
- Succeeded by: Josh MacAlister

Member of Parliament for Lewisham East
- Incumbent
- Assumed office 14 June 2018
- Preceded by: Heidi Alexander
- Majority: 18,073 (44.5%)
Shadow portfolios
2023–2024	Youth Justice
2020	Women and Equalities
2020	Faiths

Member of Lewisham Council for Whitefoot
- In office 6 May 2010 – 21 March 2019
- Succeeded by: Kim Powell

Personal details
- Born: Janet Jessica Sarju; 15 December 1970 (age 55) Greenwich, London, England
- Party: Labour
- Spouse: Donald Daby (m. 2003)
- Children: 2
- Education: Blackheath Bluecoat School
- Alma mater: Brunel University (BSc); London School of Economics (MSc)
- Website: www.janetdaby.org

Janet Jessica Daby (née Sarju; born 15 December 1970) is a British Labour politician who has served as Member of Parliament (MP) for Lewisham East since 2018. She served as Parliamentary Under-Secretary of State for Children and Families from July 2024 until September 2025.

== Early life and career ==
Janet Sarju was born on 15 December 1970 to parents who were Windrush migrants from Guyana and Jamaica. She attended Blackheath Bluecoat School in Greenwich. Daby then studied at Brunel University, graduating with a BSc, before graduating with a MSc at London School of Economics.

Daby worked in volunteer management and children's social care, acting as a registered fostering manager. She founded the Whitefoot and Downham Community Food + Project in 2013, for which she became a director.

== Political career ==
Daby was elected as a Lewisham borough councillor at the 2010 local elections, when she gained the Whitefoot ward from the Liberal Democrats and received the most votes of the three elected candidates. She was re-elected in 2014 and 2018, also topping the poll on these occasions. In addition, Daby served as deputy mayor of the London Borough of Lewisham during this period. She resigned from the Council in March 2019.

== Parliamentary career ==
Daby was selected in May 2018 as Labour's candidate in the 2018 Lewisham East by-election, after hustings with an all-women shortlist. At the election, Daby was elected to Parliament as MP for Lewisham East with 50.2% of the vote and a majority of 5,629. In response to ongoing uncertainty over Brexit, Daby pledged to fight for the UK to remain in the European Union Customs Union and the European single market.

Daby announced her resignation as a Lewisham councillor on 20 March 2019, to concentrate on her role as an MP, noting that she would continue to represent Whitefoot residents in the Houses of Parliament.

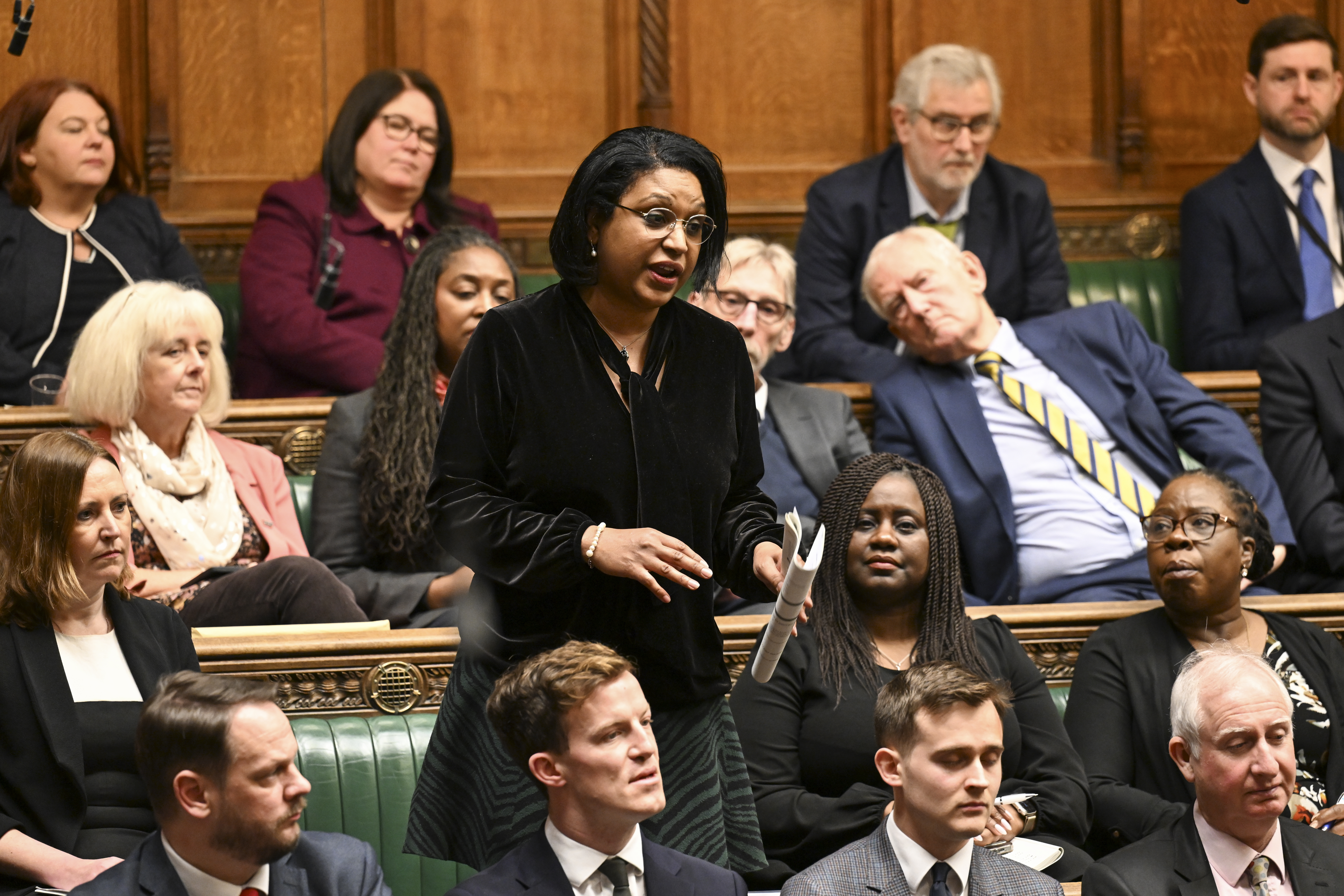
Daby speaking during Prime Minister's Questions, 7 February 2024

At the 2019 general election, Daby was re-elected as MP for Lewisham East with an increased vote share of 59.5% and an increased majority of 17,008.

On 9 April 2020, Daby was given her first shadow ministerial post by Labour Party leader Keir Starmer as Shadow Minister for Faiths. She also became a Shadow Minister for Women and Equalities in July 2020.

She resigned from the frontbench on 7 December 2020, after she suggested that registrars who have a religious objection to same-sex marriage should be protected from losing their jobs if they refuse to certify the partnership, an action which would be viewed as unlawful discrimination. She later apologised for her remarks.

Daby is a member of Labour Friends of Palestine and the Middle East.

At the 2024 general election, Daby was re-elected to Parliament as MP for Lewisham East, with a decreased vote share of 58.2% and an increased majority of 18,073.

In November 2024, Daby voted in favour of the Terminally Ill Adults (End of Life) Bill, which proposes to legalise assisted suicide.

In the September 2025 British cabinet reshuffle, Daby left the frontbench.

== Personal life ==
Daby married Donald Daby in 2003; the couple have a son and a daughter.

Parliament of the United Kingdom
Preceded by Heidi Alexander	Member of Parliament for Lewisham East; 2018–present	Incumbent
