= Ahmereen Reza =

British Pakistani architect, social worker and political activist

Ahmereen Reza OBE (born 26 November 1961) is a British Pakistani architect, social worker and political activist. Her academic and professional interests have centred on revitalisation of low income and ethnic minority rich neighbourhoods through a combination of enhanced community participation, imparting skills training to create employment opportunities, informing policy on low-income housing, and the empowerment of local women.

Reza ran unsuccessfully in the 2017 United Kingdom General Election as the Conservative Party candidate for the Birmingham Hodge Hill Constituency. In April 2019, she was selected as a Conservative List Candidate for the London Assembly.

== Early life ==
Reza was born in Karachi, West Pakistan (now Pakistan) on 26 November 1961, to Kamal Reza (1930-2016), a tea broker and banker, and Razia Reza (née Tyabji), a social worker and educator.

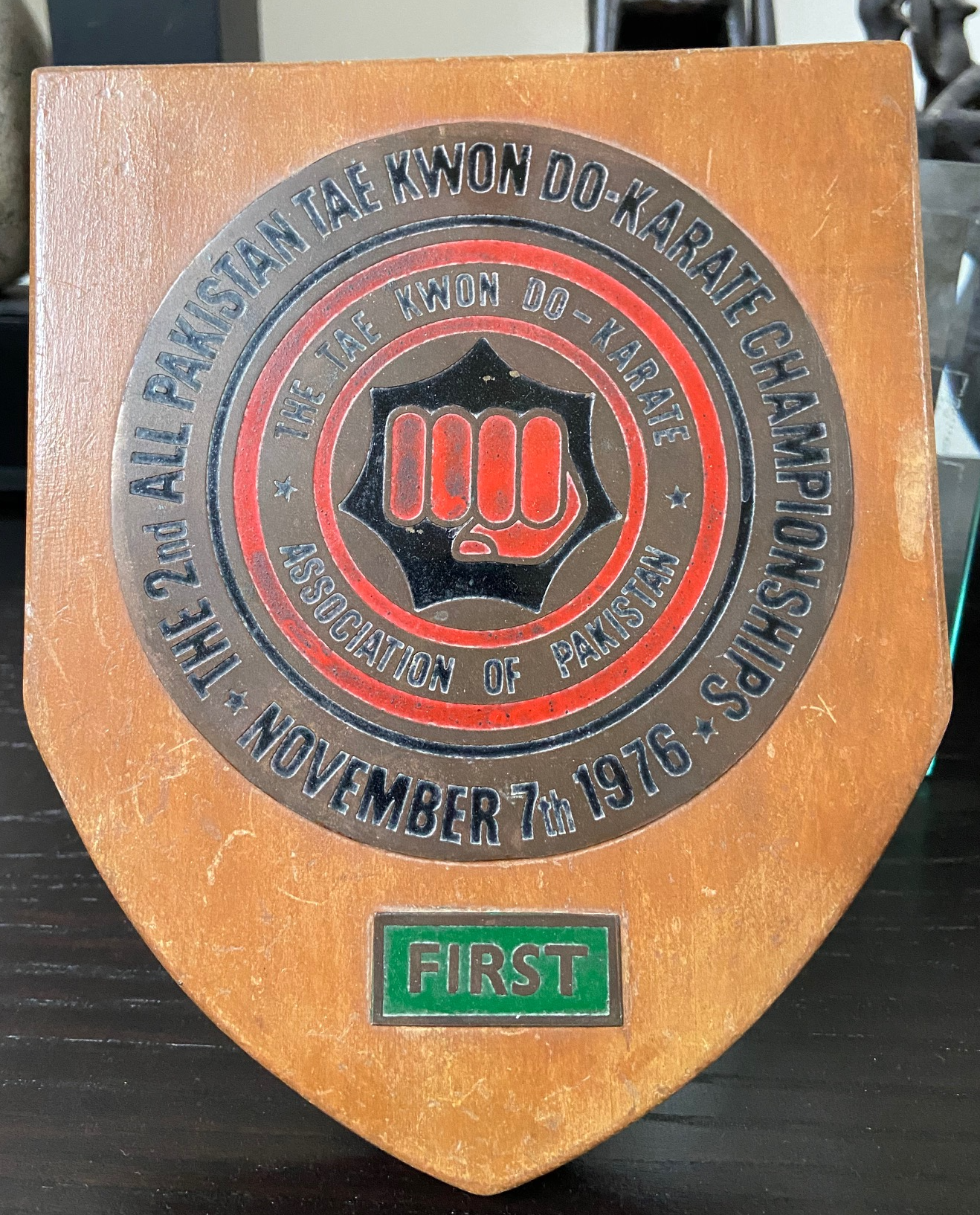
First Place Award at the 2nd All Pakistan Tae Kwon Do – Karate Championships

Reza spent her early life in Chittagong, East Pakistan (now Bangladesh), relocating in 1971 to Karachi, where she attended St. Joseph's Convent School and then went on to complete her A-Levels. As a teenager, Reza was a keen athlete and attained a black belt in Tae Kwon Do. She was awarded a First at the Pakistan Taekwondo Federation's 2nd All Pakistan Tae Kwon Do – Karate Championships in November 1976.

== Family ==
Reza hails from a family with deep historical and political ties to India, Pakistan and Bangladesh. Reza's father, Kamal, was a grand nephew to Sir Abdur Rahim, a Judge of the Madras High Court and a longstanding President of the Central Legislative Assembly. He was a nephew to Jalaludin Abdur Rahim, co-founder of the Pakistan People's Party. He was a distant relation to Huseyn Shaheed Suhrawardy, Pakistan's 5th Prime Minister, and through his sister's marriage, connected to Sahibzada Mohammad Ali Bogra, Pakistan's 3rd Prime Minister.

Reza's mother, Razia, is the great-granddaughter of Badruddin Tyabji, believed to be the first Indian to practice as a barrister at the Bombay High Court and a former President of the Indian National Congress. She is the granddaughter of Khan Bahadur Masudul Hasan, who served as Judicial Minister and later Chief Minister of Rampur State in British India. She is a grandniece to Sir Akbar Hydari, a Prime Minister of Hyderabad State in British India. She is a cousin to the late Idris Hasan Latif, former Chief of the Air Staff of the Indian Air Force and Governor of Maharashtra. She is a niece to Badruddin Faiz Tyabji, Indian diplomat and a friend and associate of Jawaharlal Nehru, whose wife, Suraiya Tyabji, some credit with helping design India's national flag and with sewing the copy that flew on Nehru's car on the night of Indian Independence. She is a niece to the late Danial Latifi, an Indian jurist who represented Shah Bano, a Muslim divorcée, in a seminal case before the Indian Supreme Court.

== Education ==
In 1982, Reza enrolled at the Pratt Institute, Brooklyn, New York, completing her Bachelor of Architecture degree in 1986. Leading up to graduation, Reza worked at the Pratt Center for Community Development in Brooklyn, New York, where she remained until March 1987.

Reza's burgeoning interest in low income housing and community development led her to enrol in 1987 in the SMArchS Program at the Massachusetts Institute to Technology (MIT) in Cambridge, MA. In 1988, whilst at MIT, she was awarded a travel grant by the Aga Khan Program for Islamic Architecture at MIT to document informal housing in Bosnia, then a part of Yugoslavia.

== Personal ==
Reza is married to Ashraf Hameedi, a banker. They have two sons.

== Professional life ==
Following graduation from MIT in 1989, Reza joined Obayashi Corporation in Tokyo, Japan to work as an architect. In 1991, she relocated to Karachi, Pakistan, where she set up her own architecture firm, AR Associates. In 1995, Reza relocated to Singapore and took time off from her career to focus on parenting. In 1999, she briefly returned to Boston, MA to work at DHK Architects.

In 2000, Reza relocated to London, where she was involved in research led by Geoffrey Payne & Associates for a report "Innovative Approaches to Secure Tenure" that was commissioned by the UK Department for International Development and the Lincoln Institute for Land Policy in Cambridge, MA. The report reviewed innovative approaches for increasing security of tenure for the urban poor and involved working with NGOs in fifteen Commonwealth countries and was part of the run-up to the United Nations Istanbul + 5 Conference in New York.

In 2007, Reza co-founded DIL Trust UK, an education charity. As chairperson, Reza was credited with building the charity's donor base, expanding its focus to include the provision of education and job opportunities for Black Asian and Minority Ethnic (BAME) communities in the UK, and soliciting the patronage of leading women professionals, including Dr Maleeha Lodhi, Princess Badiya bint Hassan of Jordan, Baroness Greenfield of Ot Moor, Baroness Verma of Leicester, and Pinky Lilani CBE. In May 2014, Reza stepped down as DIL Trust UK's Chairperson but remained a Trustee.

In September 2012, Reza was appointed vice chairperson and in April 2014 appointed acting CEO of the British Pakistan Foundation. In September 2014, she was appointed country director of Aman UK, a post she held until December 2016. In January 2017, Reza was appointed non-executive director by the Southern Housing Group and currently serves on its Community Investment and Committee. In August 2017, Reza joined the board of Nisa-Nashim, a Jewish-Muslim Women's Network dedicated to tackling the dual threats of Islamophobia and antisemitism.

== Awards ==
In 2014, Reza received the Eurasian Philanthropy Award from the Sanch Foundation for her work on enabling social mobility for BAME women in England by providing English language classes to mothers of underperforming students in the London Borough of Brent.

In 2015, Reza was recognised at the UK House of Lords' British Community Honours Awards for her work at DIL Trust UK on mentoring school children, providing English as a Second Language (ESOL) courses, mentoring BAME mothers of under-performing students, and providing arts and well-being classes to terminally ill children at Great Ormond Street, Evelina Children's Hospital at St. Thomas' and the Royal London Hospital.

Reza was appointed Officer of the Order of the British Empire (OBE) in the 2020 Birthday Honours for public and political service and interfaith work.

== Politics ==
In 2012 Reza became a Director of the Conservative Friends of Pakistan, a Conservative Party Link Group. In 2012, Reza was invited to join the Board of the Conservative Party's Communities Work Group, a group set up by then Deputy Chairman James Cleverly MP to advise the Conservative Party on aspects of community engagement.

In the 2017 United Kingdom General Election, Reza ran unsuccessfully as the Conservative Party candidate for the Birmingham Hodge Hill Constituency. In April 2019, Reza was selected as a Conservative List Candidate for the London Assembly. In May 2019, Reza appeared [uncredited] alongside Theresa May and others in a Party Political Broadcast for the 2019 European Parliament Election.
