= Brian Rose (podcaster) =

American-born podcaster (born 1971)

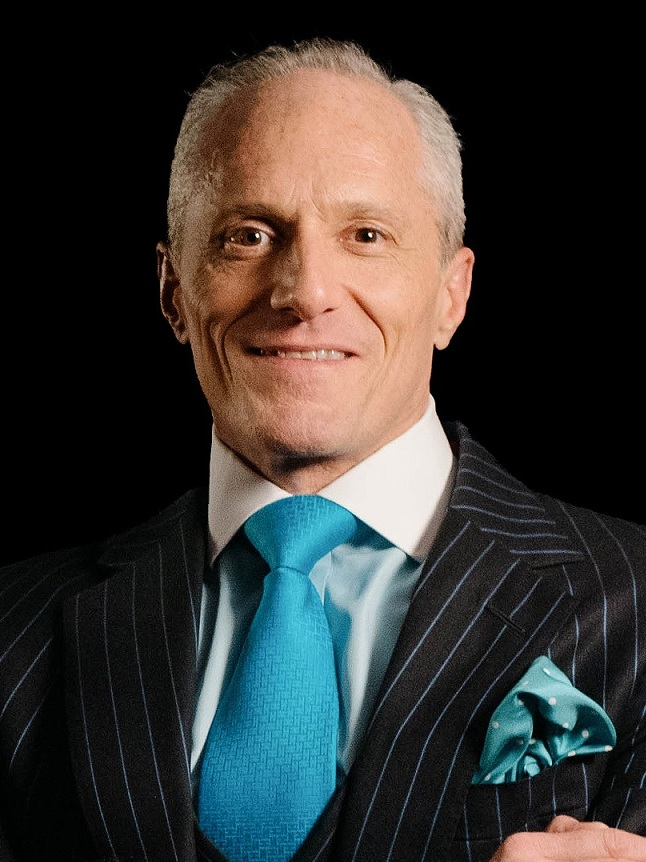
- Rose in 2022
- Born: May 1971 (age 54); San Diego, California, U.S.
- Citizenship: United States; United Kingdom (since 2007)
- Occupations: Podcaster; banker
- Website: londonreal.tv

Brian Rose (born May 1971) is an American-British podcaster, political candidate, and former banker. He is the host of London Real, a podcast and former YouTube channel he founded in 2011. He was a candidate for the 2021 London mayoral and London Assembly elections for his own London Real Party.

== Early life and career ==
Brian Rose was born in San Diego, United States, in May 1971. His early career was as a banker in New York City and London. Rose has described how he became addicted to alcohol and then other drugs, including a heroin overdose in 2001. He moved to London in 2002 and stopped using drugs, becoming a British citizen in 2007.

== Career ==
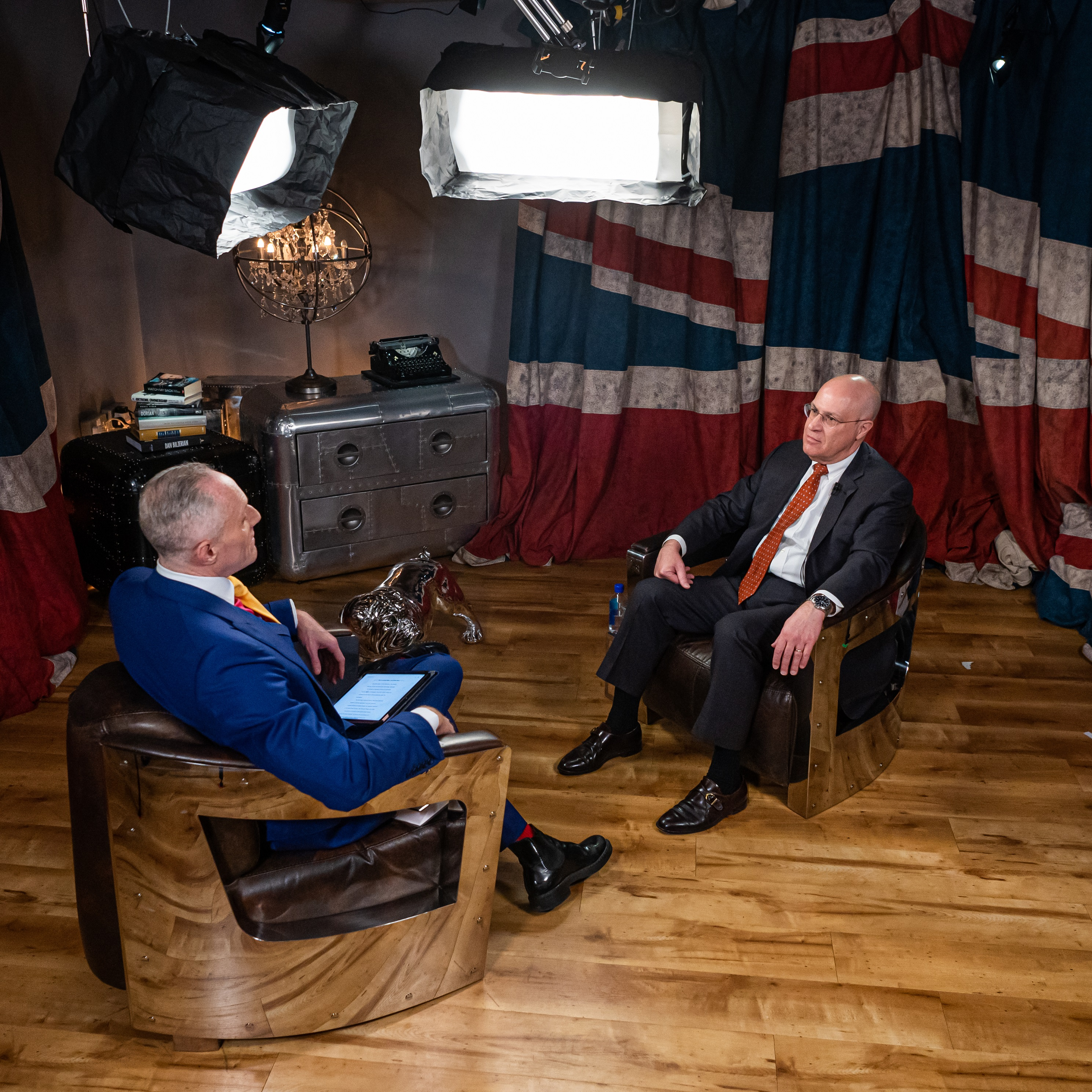
Rose interviewing J. Christopher Giancarlo in March 2022

In 2011, Rose co-founded the podcast and YouTube channel London Real with Nic Gabriel. As of 2020, he was its host and CEO, with the channel having two million subscribers. Guests on the show have included Gary Vaynerchuk and Wim Hof. His most popular video was with Mantak Chia where they discuss sexual exercises for men.

Rose has also conducted interviews with conspiracy theorist David Icke, in one of which Icke falsely claimed a link between the COVID-19 pandemic and 5G mobile phone networks. The video was later removed from YouTube, Facebook, and Spotify. Rose has said about the interview: "I'm proud we broadcast it. We fought against censorship last year because I want people to have these discussions and I want to have them out in the open... By no means do I agree with everything he says." While interviewing Icke, Rose said, "I personally don't believe the Coronavirus was created by a third party. I do think it occurred naturally. I do believe in the science and I do believe in vaccines". Rose has, however, described the United Kingdom government's COVID-19 response as "disproportionate".

Along with London Real, Rose set up an academy offering courses on public speaking, business, and motivation. Vice reported that Rose's "Business Accelerator" programmes have been criticised by past customers. In 2020, the only active company registered in Rose's name was Longstem Limited.

== Politics ==
In the US, Rose originally voted Democratic and then became a Republican. He did not vote in the 2016 London mayoral or 2019 UK general elections. Rose stood in the 2021 London mayoral and London Assembly elections for his own London Real Party.

On 24 January 2021, Rose and six of his staff were fined by police for breaking lockdown rules while filming promotional material for his campaign. He was criticised in the election for his hosting of David Icke on London Real. He finished seventh with 31,111 votes in the mayoral election, while his party finished 11th on the London-wide list with 18,395 votes.

Rose declared himself as a candidate in the 2024 London mayoral election. He finished last with 7,501 votes, 0.3% of all votes cast.

== Personal life ==
Rose is married to Mariana, originally from Bulgaria. She has a daughter from a previous relationship, and they have two sons.
