= Caroline Pidgeon, Baroness Pidgeon =

British politician (born 1972)

The Right Honourable The Baroness Pidgeon MBE
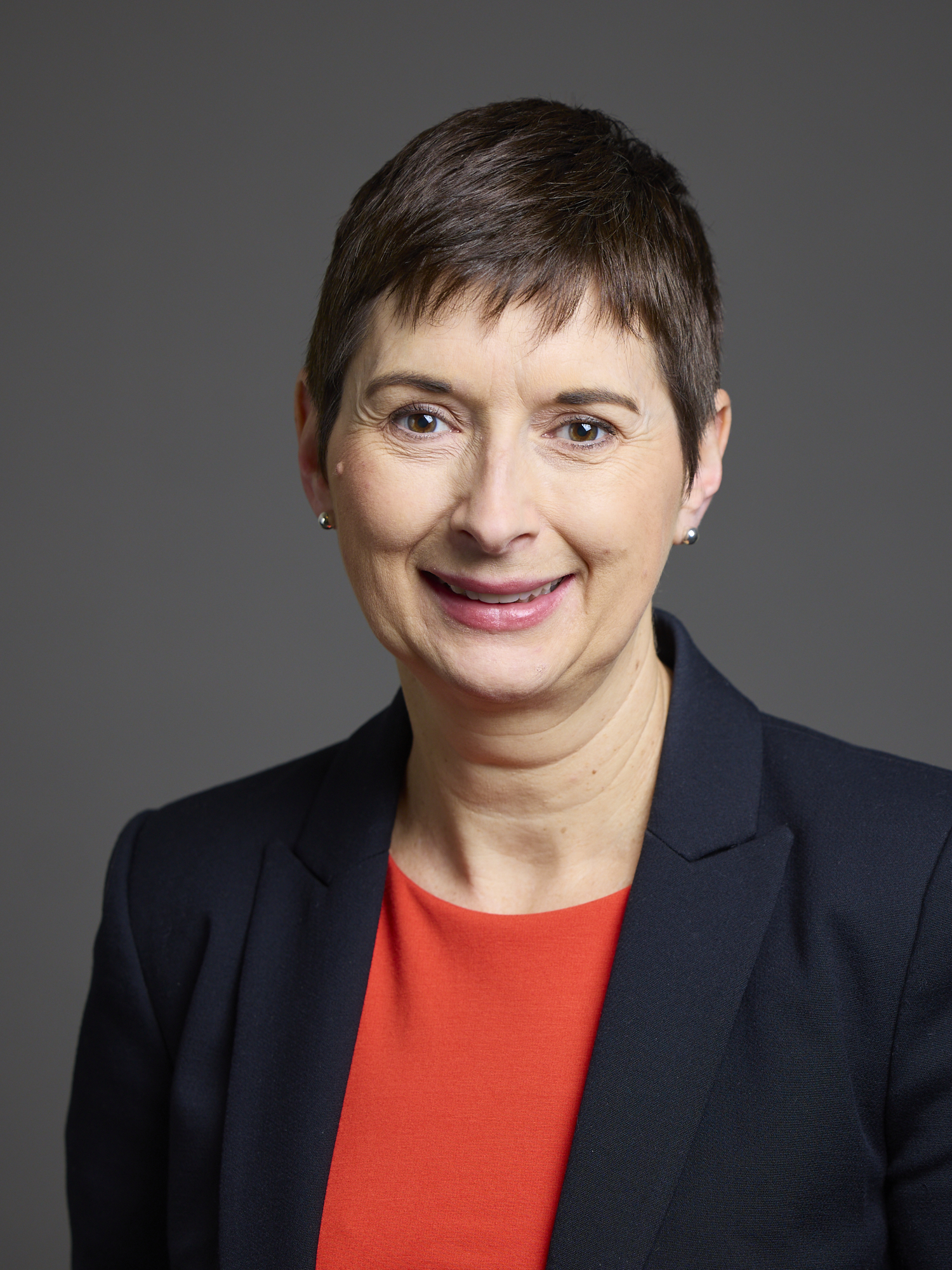
- Official portrait, 2024

Member of the House of Lords
- Lord Temporal
- Life peerage 12 August 2024

Leader of the Liberal Democrats in the London Assembly
- In office 13 May 2010 – 6 May 2024
- Leader: Nick Clegg; Tim Farron; Vince Cable; Jo Swinson; Sal Brinton (interim); Mark Pack (interim); Ed Davey
- Preceded by: Mike Tuffrey
- Succeeded by: Hina Bokhari

Member of the London Assembly as an additional member
- In office 1 May 2008 – 6 May 2024

Member of Southwark London Borough Council for Newington
- In office 7 May 1998 – 6 May 2010
- Succeeded by: Catherine Bowman

Chair of the English Liberal Democrats
- Incumbent
- Assumed office January 2025
- Preceded by: Lucas North

Personal details
- Born: Caroline Valerie Pidgeon; 29 September 1972 (age 54) Eastleigh, Hampshire, England
- Party: Liberal Democrats
- Spouse: Paul Miles (m. 2006)
- Children: 1
- Education: Aberystwyth University
- Occupation: Politician
- Website: www.carolinepidgeon.org

Caroline Valerie Pidgeon, Baroness Pidgeon, MBE (born 29 September 1972), is a British politician. She served as the leader of the Liberal Democrats in the London Assembly from 2010 to 2024, and was a member of the London Assembly (AM) from 2008 to 2024. Pidgeon was a councillor on Southwark London Borough Council from 1998 to 2010 and has been a member of the House of Lords since 2024.

== Early life and education ==
Pidgeon was born in Eastleigh, Hampshire, on 29 September 1972 to Eric and Valerie Pidgeon. She grew up in Hampshire, and graduated from Aberystwyth University with a degree in economics in 1994. After university, Pidgeon moved to London.

== Career ==
From 1994 to 1996, Pidgeon was a political researcher for Rose Colley, a councillor on Southwark London Borough Council. Pidgeon was also a political researcher at Brent Council from 1996 to 1999. She was employed at Croydon Health Authority as a communications manager from 1999 to 2002, and undertook the same role at Guy's and St Thomas' NHS Foundation Trust from 2002 to 2006.

At the 1998 local election, Pidgeon was elected as a Liberal Democrat councillor for Southwark London Borough Council, representing the ward of Newington. During her time on the Council, she served as deputy leader of the council (from 2002 to 2004), and as a cabinet member for Education (2004–2006) and Children's Services (2006–2008).

Between 2002 and 2010, Pidgeon was a board member of Lambeth and Southwark Housing Association. Pidgeon has also been a Trustee of the Centre for Literacy in Primary Education since 2005.

In the 2008 London Assembly election, Pidgeon was selected as the Liberal Democrats' candidate for the Lambeth and Southwark constituency; she came second to Labour's Valerie Shawcross. In the same election, she was the third candidate on the party's London-wide party list and was thereby elected onto the London Assembly. Pidgeon was re-elected in 2012 and again in 2016.

Following her election to the London Assembly, Pidgeon retired from Southwark Council at the 2010 local election. At the 2010 general election on the same day, Pidgeon unsuccessfully stood in the Vauxhall constituency, finishing in second place.

On the London Assembly, Pidgeon served as a member of the Metropolitan Police Authority between 2008 and 2012 and the London Fire and Emergency Planning Authority between 2008 and 2010. Pidgeon served as Chair of the London Assembly's Transport Committee.

In the 2013 New Year Honours, Pidgeon was appointed a Member of the Order of the British Empire (MBE) for public and political service.

In September 2015, Pidgeon secured the Liberal Democrats' candidacy for the 2016 London mayoral election. Pidgeon promised to focus on housing, affordable childcare, air pollution and public transport. She emphasised the need to ensure that workers can live in the city by using rent control and reducing public transport costs. She increased the Lib Dem vote from 4.2% to 4.6% but the party remained in fourth place. She held her seat on the London Assembly as the only Liberal Democrat. She ranked 13 out of 50 on the Top 50 Influential Lib Dems of 2020 list.

Pidgeon was reelected as one of two Liberal Democrat members in the 2021 London Assembly election. In November 2022 she announced that she would not seek reelection in the 2024 election.

Pidgeon assumed the role of chair of the English Liberal Democrats on 1 January 2025.

== Peerage ==
After standing down from the London Assembly, Pidgeon was nominated for a life peerage in the 2024 Dissolution Honours. She was created Baroness Pidgeon, of Newington in the London Borough of Southwark, on 12 August 2024.

== Personal life ==
Pidgeon lives with her husband, Paul Miles, whom she married in 2006, and their son. Outside of politics, she enjoys cinema and modern art.
