= Peter Whittle (politician) =

British politician (1961–2025)

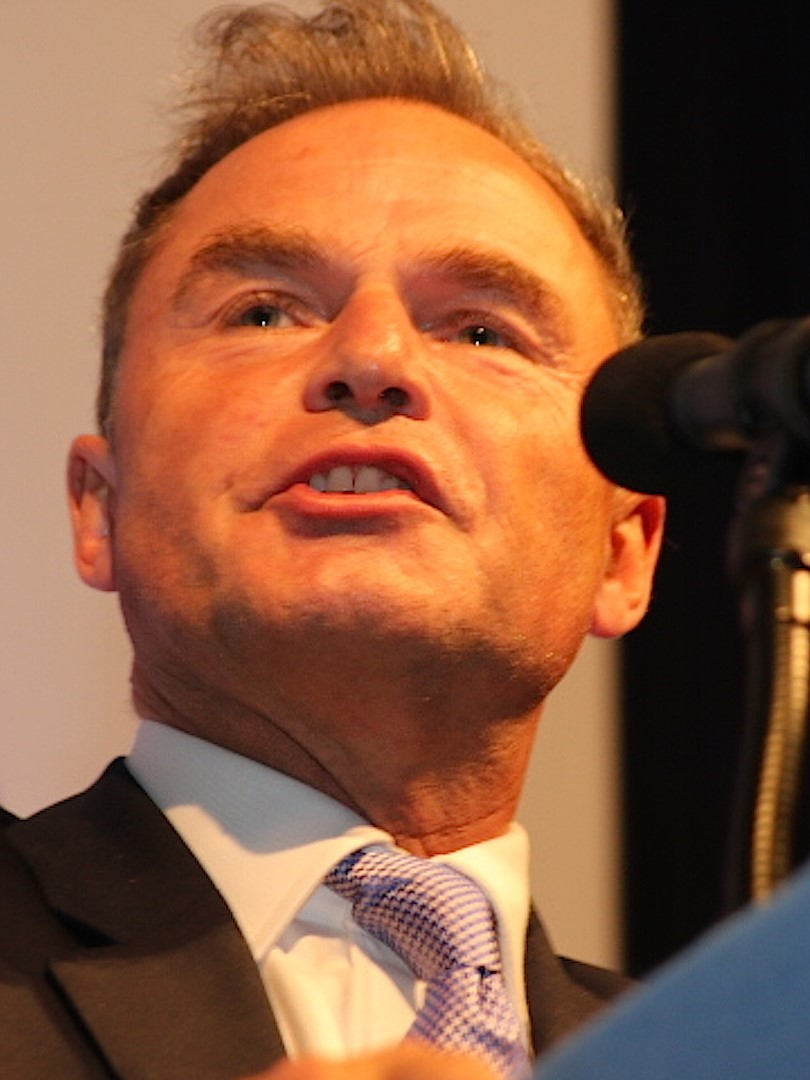
- Whittle in 2017

Leader of the Brexit Alliance
- In office 13 December 2018 – 6 May 2021
- Deputy: David Kurten
- Preceded by: Office established
- Succeeded by: Office abolished

Deputy Leader of the UK Independence Party
- In office 28 November 2016 – 18 October 2017
- Leader: Paul Nuttall; Steve Crowther (acting)
- Preceded by: Paul Nuttall
- Succeeded by: Margot Parker

Leader of UKIP in the London Assembly
- In office 6 May 2016 – 22 January 2018
- Preceded by: Office established
- Succeeded by: Office abolished

Member of the London Assembly as an additional member
- In office 6 May 2016 – 8 May 2021

UKIP portfolios
- 2014–2017: Culture
- 2014–2017: Communities

Personal details
- Born: Peter Robin Whittle; 6 January 1961 Waterloo, London, England
- Died: 27 November 2025 (aged 64) Windsor, Berkshire, England
- Party: Independent (2018–2025)
- Other political affiliations: Brexit Alliance (2018–2021); UKIP (until 2018); Conservative (previously)
- Education: University of Kent (BA)
- Committees: Confirmation Hearings; GLA Oversight; Police and Crime

Peter Robin Whittle (6 January 1961 – 27 November 2025) was a British politician, author, journalist and broadcaster who served as a Member of the London Assembly from 2016 to 2021 and as Deputy Leader of the UK Independence Party (UKIP) to Paul Nuttall from 2016 to 2017. He was the founder and director of the New Culture Forum think tank and host of So What You're Saying Is..., a weekly cultural and political interview show on YouTube.

After a career in media in the United Kingdom and the United States, Whittle founded the New Culture Forum in 2006. He joined the UK Independence Party (UKIP) and was the party's candidate for the 2016 London mayoral contest, which was held at the same time as the election to the London Assembly in which he won a seat on that body. He served as the party's deputy leader between November 2016 and October 2017 and was a prominent, but unsuccessful, candidate in the 2017 UKIP leadership election.

Whittle resigned as UKIP's London Assembly leader in January 2018, following Henry Bolton's refusal to stand down following a vote of no confidence in his leadership by UKIP's National Executive Committee. He resigned his membership of UKIP in protest at Gerard Batten's leadership in December 2018, after which he served as leader of the new Brexit Alliance in the London Assembly and as chairman of the Assembly's audit panel.

== Early life ==
Whittle was born in the General Lying-in Hospital in Waterloo, London, or in Peckham. His family moved across south-east London, from Peckham to Shooter's Hill or Woolwich. Whittle was educated at The John Roan School and later at Orpington College, then attended University of Kent, where he obtained a BA in history and politics.

== Career ==
=== Television and newspapers ===
Between 1991 and 2003, Whittle worked as a TV producer and director of arts and factual programmes for ITV, Channel 4 and Channel 5 in the United Kingdom, including a prolonged stint at the long-running TV arts series The South Bank Show, as well as USA Network and Fox Broadcasting Company in the United States, living for five years in Los Angeles.

As a journalist, he was an arts and film critic for national and international publications including The Times, The Sunday Times and the Los Angeles Times, as well as a columnist for Standpoint magazine (for which he wrote "Whittle's London"). Starting with regular contributions as a cultural commentator and critic on BBC Two's Newsnight Review (later The Review Show) in the 2000s, Whittle made appearances in the broadcast media, on programmes such as Question Time and The Andrew Marr Show on BBC One, and Start the Week, Any Questions? and The Moral Maze on BBC Radio 4. He also appeared on Sky News, including a debate on racism in British society chaired by presenter Samantha Washington, opposite commentator Ash Sarkar.

=== Politics ===
At the 2006 local elections in Greenwich, Whittle unsuccessfully contested the Blackheath Westcombe ward for the Conservative Party.

Whittle became UKIP's cultural spokesman in 2013, and stood for Eltham at the 2015 general election, coming third with 15% of the vote, with a share surpassing both the Liberal Democrats and the Green Party.

In September 2015, Whittle was selected as the UKIP candidate for Mayor of London, as well as topping the party list for election to the London Assembly. He was subsequently elected as a London Assembly Member in the Assembly elections of May 2016.

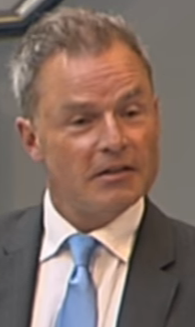
Whittle in the London Assembly

On 12 October 2016, Whittle announced his intention to stand for UKIP leader in November's election called following the resignation of Diane James after just 18 days; however, he decided to stand for the position of deputy leader instead and was duly successful in this candidature. On 28 November 2016, it was announced that Whittle was the new deputy leader of UKIP, replacing Paul Nuttall, then newly appointed as party leader.

Following the election of Henry Bolton as leader of UKIP in October 2017, Whittle left the role of deputy leader and was appointed UKIP spokesman for London affairs (the party's leader in the London Assembly). He resigned as London spokesman on 22 January 2018, following Bolton's refusal to stand down after a vote of no confidence in his leadership by UKIP's National Executive Committee.

In December 2018, Whittle resigned from UKIP in protest at Gerard Batten's leadership. He then served as an independent member of the London Assembly and leader of the Assembly's Brexit Alliance group, as well as chairman of the London Assembly's audit panel and a member of its police and crime committee, the Greater London Authority (GLA) oversight committee and confirmation hearings committee. The Brexit Alliance was a GLA grouping of independents and not a registered political party, and it consisted of Whittle and David Kurten, who continued to be a member of UKIP until January 2020.

He did not seek re-election at the 2021 London Assembly election.

=== New Culture Forum ===
In 2006, Whittle founded the New Culture Forum (NCF), a think tank whose mission is described as "challenging the cultural orthodoxies dominant in the media, academia, education, and British culture in its widest sense." Speakers at NCF events, including for its annual keynote Smith Lecture, have included Martin Amis, Dame Vivien Westwood, Jeremy Hunt, Michael Gove, Nigel Farage, Justin Webb, Sir Anthony Seldon, Petroc Trelawny, Ed Vaizey, Melanie Phillips, Brendan O'Neill and Owen Jones. Writers for the New Culture Forum have included Douglas Murray, Julie Bindel, Ed West and Dennis Sewell.

In 2019, Whittle launched the New Culture Forum channel, a YouTube channel which aims to redress the balance which it claims is currently lacking in the mainstream media. Now one of the UK's most popular conservative/rightwing channels, the NCF channel currently provides three distinct programmes: So What You're Saying Is..., NCF CounterCulture and NCF Newspeak.

Hosted by Whittle himself, So What You're Saying Is... is the New Culture Forum's interview programme and is named after a phrase repeatedly uttered by Cathy Newman of Britain's Channel 4 News during a combative interview with psychologist and right-wing influencer Jordan Peterson. The interview, regarded by many commentators as symbolic of a wider problem amongst the mainstream media, became a viral phenomenon, with critics alleging Newman's preconceptions led her to misinterpret Peterson and alter his statements.

Covering cultural, social and political topics, So What You're Saying Is... features 30–60-minute discussions with guests from fields such as journalism, academia, politics and activism. Guests and topics have included Peter Hitchens and Roger Scruton on conservatism, Laurence Fox on the Reclaim Party, Ann Widdecombe on free speech, Dave Rubin on the culture wars and Robin Aitken on bias at the BBC.

Whittle later launched NCF CounterCulture, a cultural and socio-political discussion show. Hosted by Whittle, the weekly programme featured a panel composed of a resident panelist (the author and historian Rafe Heydel-Mankoo) and two or three guest panellists. Guest panellists have included Lionel Shriver, Claire Fox, James Delingpole, Charles Moore and Andrew Klavan.

The NCF channel's third weekly programme, NCF Newspeak, provides a platform for individuals to personally address the public on a relevant subject of their choosing by means of a short, self-authored speech direct to camera.

== Personal life and death ==
Whittle previously lived in south east London. He was openly gay and was the only LGBT candidate selected by any of the parties for the 2016 London mayoral election.

As of 2022, he lived in Windsor, Berkshire.

In October 2025, he reported that he was diagnosed with stage 4 oesophageal cancer, and as a consequence brought forward his marriage. Whittle died from cancer on 27 November 2025, at the age of 64.

== Books and pamphlets ==
- Look at Me: Celebrating the Self in Modern Britain, London: Social Affairs Unit, 2008 (1st edn), 2018 (2nd edn).
- Private Views: Voices from the Frontline of British Culture, London: New Culture Forum, 2009.
- A Sorry State: Self-Denigration in British Culture, London: New Culture Forum, 2010.
- Monarchy Matters, London: Social Affairs Unit, 2011.
- Being British: What's Wrong With It?, London: Biteback, 2012.
- Reel Life: Peter Whittle at the Movies, London: Standpoint, 2014.
