= Democrats and Veterans =

Democrats and Veterans Direct Democracy Party
- Abbreviation: DVDDP
- Leader: John Rees-Evans
- Deputy Leader: Vacant
- Party Chairman: Gavin Felton
- General Secretary: Ian Gorman
- Founded: 10 January 2018
- Headquarters: 29 Kilcredaun House, Ferry Court, Cardiff, CF11 0JG, Wales
- Ideology: Euroscepticism
- Colours: Black
- Slogan: "We Serve"
- House of Commons: 0 / 650
- Local government: 0 / 21,259

Website
- Official website

The Democrats and Veterans Direct Democracy Party (DVDDP) was a political party in the United Kingdom. The party was founded in 2018 by former UKIP member and Gulf War veteran Gavin Felton and other ex-servicemen of the British Armed Forces. John Rees-Evans, previously a UKIP leadership candidate, was announced as the first party leader, and Gavin Felton named as chairman.

The party considers itself to be "broadly libertarian in character". Its platform includes complete withdrawal from the European Union, direct democracy, and stronger support for veterans.

== Electoral history ==
In January 2018, the party said it had 321 candidates "ready to fight seats throughout the country." It stated that it would target voters in Essex. The party stood candidates in the May 2018 English local elections, but did not win any seats.

The party fielded Massimo DiMambro as a candidate in the 2018 Lewisham East by-election, who lost his deposit, having received under 5% of the vote.

The party took second place in a Barnsley local by-election in July 2018; took third in a by-election for a seat on Denbighshire Council in September 2018; They won their first two seats on Barnsley Metropolitan Borough Council in May 2019. Cllr Victoria Felton received 1236 votes taking the Monk Bretton seat from Labour after 22 years. However, by October 2020 the council website showed that of the two elected Democrats and Veterans councillors, one, Trevor Smith, defected to the Labour Party whilst the other, Victoria Felton, was listed as Independent. In the 2019 general election, Felton ran in Barnsley Central for the Brexit Party, finishing second.

In Northern Ireland, the party stood two candidates in the 2019 local elections gaining 527 votes, the highest amongst the three new parties in the election. The year before, in October 2018, it ran in the Carrick Castle by-election and came fourth in what is the most prominent unionist consistency in the country.

=== Summary ===
Date of election	Constituency	Candidate	Votes	%
14 June 2018	Lewisham East	Massimo DiMambro	67	0.3
4 April 2019	Newport West	Philip Taylor	185	0.8
3 May 2019	Barnsley (Monk Bretton Ward)	Victoria Felton	1236	54%
2 May 2019	Erne North (NI)	Lewis Jennings	20	0.003
2 May 2019	Lisburn South (NI)	Ricky Taylor	242	0.04
2 May 2019	Carrick Castle (NI)	Si Harvey	265	0.05
