= London Assembly constituencies =

For London Assembly elections, London is divided into territorial constituencies each returning one member and London itself constitutes an electoral region returning additional members from party lists.

== Electoral system ==
The electoral system used is additional member system:

- There are 14 first-part-the-post territorial constituencies.
- There is a single electoral region electing a fixed number 11 additional members elected from a party list; seats allocated using d'Hondt method, in order; any party gaining less than 5% of the vote is not eligible for an additional member seat.
- There are no levelling seats.

== List of constituencies ==
As set out in the Greater London Authority Act 1999, each constituency comprises between two and four local authorities..

In 2024, the total electorate in 2024 was 6,162,428, with the territorial constituencies having an average electorate of around 440,000.

London Assembly constituencies

The fourteen single-member constituencies are listed below.

Constituency		Boroughs	2024 electorate	Party
1	Barnet and Camden	Barnet; Camden	413,809	Labour
2	Bexley and Bromley	Bexley; Bromley	421,800	Conservative
3	Brent and Harrow	Brent; Harrow	428,775	Labour
4	City and East	Barking and Dagenham; City of London; Newham; Tower Hamlets	628,856	Labour
5	Croydon and Sutton	Croydon; Sutton	440,715	Conservative
6	Ealing and Hillingdon	Ealing; Hillingdon	453,892	Labour
7	Enfield and Haringey	Enfield; Haringey	399,677	Labour
8	Greenwich and Lewisham	Greenwich; Lewisham	399,703	Labour
9	Havering and Redbridge	Havering; Redbridge	402,497	Conservative
10	Lambeth and Southwark	Lambeth; Southwark	448,552	Labour
11	Merton and Wandsworth	Merton; Wandsworth	384,678	Labour
12	North East	Hackney; Islington; Waltham Forest	524,885	Labour
13	South West	Hounslow; Kingston; Richmond	455,381	Liberal Democrats
14	West Central	Hammersmith and Fulham; Kensington and Chelsea; Westminster	359,208	Labour

== Assembly members ==
=== Constituency AMs ===
Election	Barnet and Camden	Bexley and Bromley	Brent and Harrow	City and East	Croydon and Sutton	Ealing and Hillingdon	Enfield and Haringey	Greenwich and Lewisham	Havering and Redbridge	Lambeth and Southwark	Merton and Wandsworth	North East	South West	West Central
2000	Brian Coleman (Con)	Bob Neill (Con)	Toby Harris (Labour)	John Biggs (Labour)	Andrew Pelling (Con)	Richard Barnes (Con)	Nicky Gavron (Labour)	Len Duvall (Labour)	Roger Evans (Con)	Val Shawcross (Labour)	Elizabeth Howlett (Con)	Meg Hillier (Labour)	Tony Arbour (Con)	Angie Bray (Con)
2004	Brian Coleman (Con)	Bob Neill (Con)	Bob Blackman (Con)	John Biggs (Labour)	Andrew Pelling (Con)	Richard Barnes (Con)	Joanne McCartney (Labour)	Len Duvall (Labour)	Roger Evans (Con)	Val Shawcross (Labour)	Elizabeth Howlett (Con)	Jennette Arnold (Labour)	Tony Arbour (Con)	Angie Bray (Con)
2008	Brian Coleman (Con)	James Cleverly (Con)	Navin Shah (Labour)	John Biggs (Labour)	Steve O'Connell (Con)	Richard Barnes (Con)	Joanne McCartney (Labour)	Len Duvall (Labour)	Roger Evans (Con)	Val Shawcross (Labour)	Richard Tracey (Con)	Jennette Arnold (Labour)	Tony Arbour (Con)	Kit Malthouse (Con)
2012	Andrew Dismore (Labour)	James Cleverly (Con)	Navin Shah (Labour)	John Biggs (Labour)	Steve O'Connell (Con)	Onkar Sahota (Labour)	Joanne McCartney (Labour)	Len Duvall (Labour)	Roger Evans (Con)	Val Shawcross (Labour)	Richard Tracey (Con)	Jennette Arnold (Labour)	Tony Arbour (Con)	Kit Malthouse (Con)
2016	Andrew Dismore (Labour)	Gareth Bacon (Con)	Navin Shah (Labour)	Unmesh Desai (Labour)	Steve O'Connell (Con)	Onkar Sahota (Labour)	Joanne McCartney (Labour)	Len Duvall (Labour)	Keith Prince (Con)	Florence Eshalomi (Labour)	Leonie Cooper (Labour)	Jennette Arnold (Labour)	Tony Arbour (Con)	Tony Devenish (Con)
2021	Anne Clarke (Labour)	Peter Fortune (Con)	Krupesh Hirani (Labour)	Unmesh Desai (Labour)	Neil Garratt (Con)	Onkar Sahota (Labour)	Joanne McCartney (Labour)	Len Duvall (Labour)	Keith Prince (Con)	Marina Ahmad (Labour)	Leonie Cooper (Labour)	Sem Moema (Labour)	Nicholas Rogers (Con)	Tony Devenish (Con)
2024	Anne Clarke (Labour)	Thomas Turrell (Con)	Krupesh Hirani (Labour)	Unmesh Desai (Labour)	Neil Garratt (Con)	Bassam Mahfouz (Labour)	Joanne McCartney (Labour)	Len Duvall (Labour)	Keith Prince (Con)	Marina Ahmad (Labour)	Leonie Cooper (Labour)	Sem Moema (Labour)	Gareth Roberts (LD)	James Small-Edwards (Labour)

=== Additional members ===
==== By seat ====
Election	1st AM	2nd AM	3rd AM	4th AM	5th AM	6th AM	7th AM	8th AM	9th AM	10th AM	11th AM
2000	LD (Sally Hamwee)	Green (Darren Johnson)	LD (Graham Tope)	Green (Victor Anderson)	LD (Lynne Featherstone)	Labour (Trevor Phillips)	Labour (Samantha Heath)	LD (Louise Bloom)	Green (Jenny Jones)	Labour (David Lammy)	Con (Eric Ollerenshaw)
2004	LD (Lynne Featherstone)	Green (Jenny Jones)	LD (Graham Tope)	UKIP (Damian Hockney)	LD (Sally Hamwee)	Green (Darren Johnson)	LD (Michael Tuffrey)	UKIP (Peter Hulme-Cross)	Labour (Nicky Gavron)	Labour (Murad Qureshi)	LD (Dee Doocey)
2008	LD (Michael Tuffrey)	Green (Jenny Jones)	LD (Dee Doocey)	BNP (Richard Barnbrook)	Green (Darren Johnson)	Labour (Nicky Gavron)	Con (Andrew Boff)	LD (Caroline Pidgeon)	Con (Victoria Borwick)	Labour (Murad Qureshi)	Con (Gareth Bacon)
2012	Green (Jenny Jones)	LD (Caroline Pidgeon)	Labour (Nicky Gavron)	Con (Andrew Boff)	Green (Darren Johnson)	Labour (Murad Qureshi)	Con (Gareth Bacon)	Labour (Fiona Twycross)	Con (Victoria Borwick)	Labour (Tom Copley)	LD (Stephen Knight)
2016	Green (Siân Berry)	UKIP (Peter Whittle)	LD (Caroline Pidgeon)	Con (Kemi Badenoch)	Con (Andrew Boff)	Labour (Fiona Twycross)	Green (Caroline Russell)	Labour (Tom Copley)	Con (Shaun Bailey)	Labour (Nicky Gavron)	UKIP (David Kurten)
2021	Green (Siân Berry)	LD (Caroline Pidgeon)	Green (Caroline Russell)	Con (Shaun Bailey)	Con (Andrew Boff)	Green (Zack Polanski)	Con (Susan Hall)	Labour (Elly Baker)	LD (Hina Bokhari)	Labour (Sakina Sheikh)	Con (Emma Best)
2024	Green (Siân Berry)	Con (Susan Hall)	Reform (Alex Wilson)	Green (Caroline Russell)	Con (Shaun Bailey)	Con (Emma Best)	LD (Hina Bokhari)	Green (Zack Polanski)	Con (Andrew Boff)	Labour (Elly Baker)	Con (Alessandro Georgiou)

==== By party representation ====
N.B.: Transfers within parties between elections omitted for simplicity: the columns of this table do not represent actual constituencies.

Year	AM	AM	AM	AM	AM	AM	AM	AM	AM	AM	AM
2000	Darren Johnson (Green)	Jenny Jones (Green)	Victor Anderson (Green)	Louise Bloom (LD)	Lynne Featherstone (LD)	Samantha Heath (Labour)	David Lammy (Labour)	Graham Tope (LD)	Sally Hamwee (LD)	Trevor Phillips (Labour)	Eric Ollerenshaw (Con)
2000	Darren Johnson (Green)	Jenny Jones (Green)	Victor Anderson (Green)	Louise Bloom (LD)	Lynne Featherstone (LD)	Samantha Heath (Labour)	Jennette Arnold (Labour)	Graham Tope (LD)	Sally Hamwee (LD)	Trevor Phillips (Labour)	Eric Ollerenshaw (Con)
2002	Darren Johnson (Green)	Jenny Jones (Green)	Victor Anderson (Green)	Michael Tuffrey (LD)	Lynne Featherstone (LD)	Samantha Heath (Labour)	Jennette Arnold (Labour)	Graham Tope (LD)	Sally Hamwee (LD)	Trevor Phillips (Labour)	Eric Ollerenshaw (Con)
2003	Darren Johnson (Green)	Jenny Jones (Green)	Noel Lynch (Green)	Michael Tuffrey (LD)	Lynne Featherstone (LD)	Samantha Heath (Labour)	Jennette Arnold (Labour)	Graham Tope (LD)	Sally Hamwee (LD)	Diana Johnson (Labour)	Eric Ollerenshaw (Con)
2004	Darren Johnson (Green)	Jenny Jones (Green)	Dee Doocey (LD)	Michael Tuffrey (LD)	Lynne Featherstone (LD)	Nicky Gavron (Labour)	Murad Qureshi (Labour)	Graham Tope (LD)	Sally Hamwee (LD)	Damian Hockney (UKIP/1L)	Peter Hulme-Cross (UKIP/1L)
2005	Darren Johnson (Green)	Jenny Jones (Green)	Dee Doocey (LD)	Michael Tuffrey (LD)	Geoff Pope (LD)	Nicky Gavron (Labour)	Murad Qureshi (Labour)	Graham Tope (LD)	Sally Hamwee (LD)	Damian Hockney (UKIP/1L)	Peter Hulme-Cross (UKIP/1L)
2008	Darren Johnson (Green)	Jenny Jones (Green)	Dee Doocey (LD)	Michael Tuffrey (LD)	Caroline Pidgeon (LD)	Nicky Gavron (Labour)	Murad Qureshi (Labour)	Andrew Boff (Con/Ind)	Victoria Borwick (Con)	Gareth Bacon (Con)	Richard Barnbrook (BNP)
2012	Darren Johnson (Green)	Jenny Jones (Green)	Fiona Twycross (Labour)	Tom Copley (Labour)	Caroline Pidgeon (LD)	Nicky Gavron (Labour)	Murad Qureshi (Labour)	Andrew Boff (Con/Ind)	Victoria Borwick (Con)	Gareth Bacon (Con)	Stephen Knight (LD)
2015	Darren Johnson (Green)	Jenny Jones (Green)	Fiona Twycross (Labour)	Tom Copley (Labour)	Caroline Pidgeon (LD)	Nicky Gavron (Labour)	Murad Qureshi (Labour)	Andrew Boff (Con/Ind)	Kemi Badenoch (Con)	Gareth Bacon (Con)	Stephen Knight (LD)
2016	Siân Berry (Green)	Caroline Russell (Green)	Fiona Twycross (Labour)	Tom Copley (Labour)	Caroline Pidgeon (LD)	Nicky Gavron (Labour)	Shaun Bailey (Con)	Andrew Boff (Con/Ind)	Kemi Badenoch (Con)	David Kurten (UKIP/Brexit Alliance)	Peter Whittle (UKIP/Brexit Alliance)
2017	Siân Berry (Green)	Caroline Russell (Green)	Fiona Twycross (Labour)	Tom Copley (Labour)	Caroline Pidgeon (LD)	Nicky Gavron (Labour)	Shaun Bailey (Con)	Andrew Boff (Con/Ind)	Susan Hall (Con)	David Kurten (UKIP/Brexit Alliance)	Peter Whittle (UKIP/Brexit Alliance)
2018	Siân Berry (Green)	Caroline Russell (Green)	Fiona Twycross (Labour)	Tom Copley (Labour)	Caroline Pidgeon (LD)	Nicky Gavron (Labour)	Shaun Bailey (Con)	Andrew Boff (Con/Ind)	Susan Hall (Con)	David Kurten (UKIP/Brexit Alliance)	Peter Whittle (UKIP/Brexit Alliance)
2020	Siân Berry (Green)	Caroline Russell (Green)	Murad Qureshi (Labour)	Alison Moore (Labour)	Caroline Pidgeon (LD)	Nicky Gavron (Labour)	Shaun Bailey (Con)	Andrew Boff (Con/Ind)	Susan Hall (Con)	David Kurten (UKIP/Brexit Alliance)	Peter Whittle (UKIP/Brexit Alliance)
2021	Siân Berry (Green)	Caroline Russell (Green)	Zack Polanski (Green)	Hina Bokhari (LD)	Caroline Pidgeon (LD)	Elly Baker (Labour)	Shaun Bailey (Con)	Andrew Boff (Con/Ind)	Susan Hall (Con)	Emma Best (Con)	Sakina Sheikh (Labour)
2024	Siân Berry (Green)	Caroline Russell (Green)	Zack Polanski (Green)	Hina Bokhari (LD)	Alessandro Georgiou (Con)	Elly Baker (Labour)	Shaun Bailey (Con)	Andrew Boff (Con/Ind)	Susan Hall (Con)	Emma Best (Con)	Alex Wilson (Reform)
2024	Zoë Garbett (Green)	Caroline Russell (Green)	Zack Polanski (Green)	Hina Bokhari (LD)	Alessandro Georgiou (Con)	Elly Baker (Labour)	Shaun Bailey (Con)	Andrew Boff (Con/Ind)	Susan Hall (Con)	Emma Best (Con)	Alex Wilson (Reform)
2026	Benali Hamdache (Green)	Caroline Russell (Green)	Zack Polanski (Green)	Hina Bokhari (LD)	Alessandro Georgiou (Con)	Elly Baker (Labour)	Shaun Bailey (Con)	Andrew Boff (Con/Ind)	Susan Hall (Con)	Emma Best (Con)	Alex Wilson (Reform)

== See also ==
- List of electoral divisions in Greater London
- List of electoral wards in Greater London
- Parliamentary constituencies in London
