= Alison Moore =

Alison Moore may refer to:

- Alison Moore (writer) (born 1971), English writer
- Alison Moore (politician), British politician
