= Samantha Heath =

English politician (1960–2019)

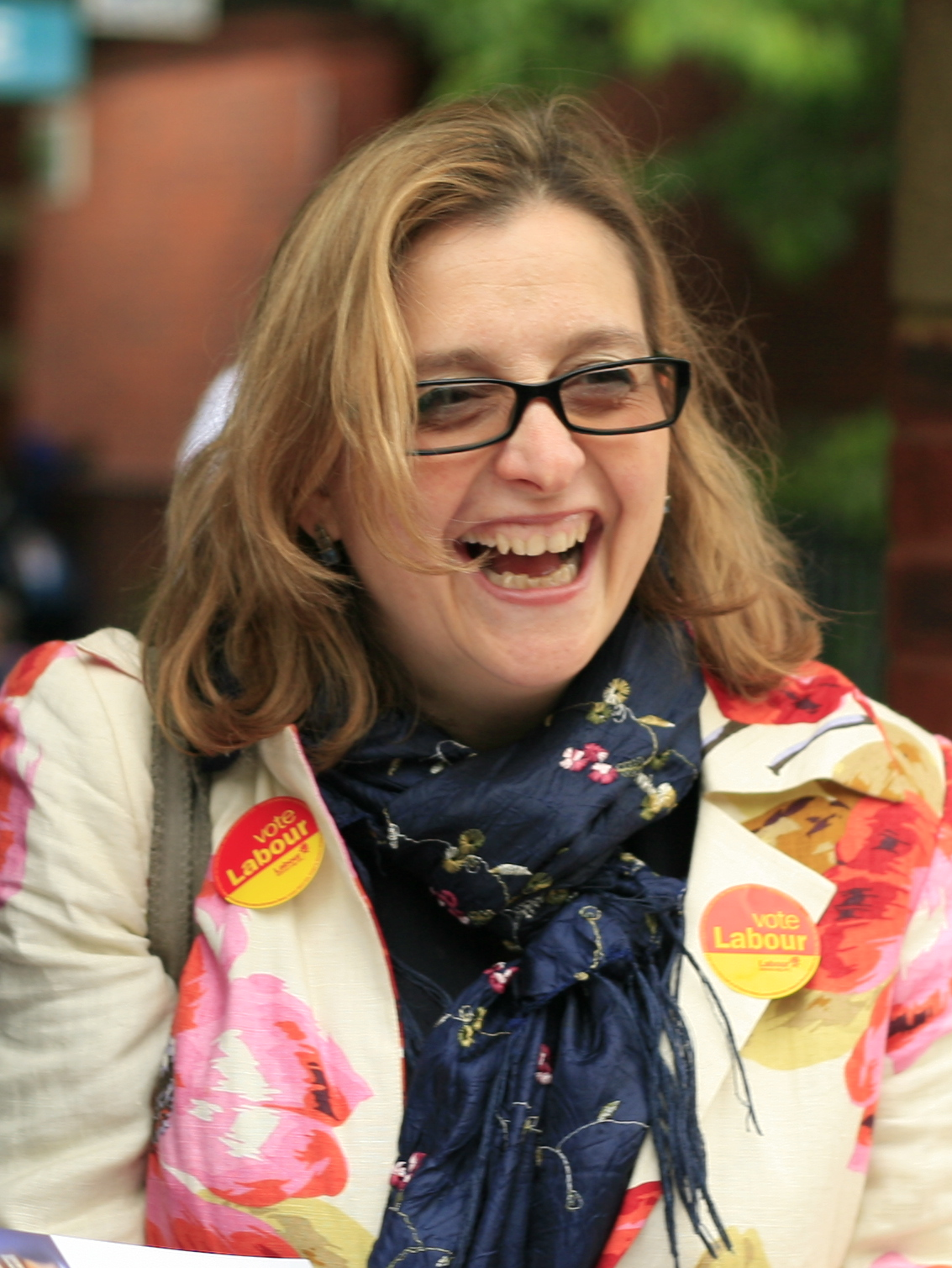
- Heath in June 2013

Member of the London Assembly as an additional member
- In office 4 May 2000 – 10 June 2004
- Preceded by: Assembly created
- Succeeded by: Murad Qureshi

Wandsworth London Borough Councilor for Latchmere
- In office 5 May 1994 – 2 May 2002
- Preceded by: Anthony Tuck
- Succeeded by: Bhavna Joshi

Personal details
- Born: 6 June 1960
- Died: 29 March 2019 (aged 58)
- Party: Labour
- Education: Heriot-Watt University

Samantha Heath (6 June 1960 – 29 March 2019) was a British politician who was a member of the London Assembly from 2000 to 2004.

== Career ==
Heath trained as a civil engineer at Heriot-Watt University and worked for many years in the construction industry. She was a lecturer in design and construction management at the University of Greenwich until May 2000. For eight years from May 1994 until she stood down in May 2002, Heath was a Wandsworth Labour PartyCouncillor, representing the Latchmere Ward in Battersea. She served on the Education, Housing and Environment committees 1994–2002, and was the lead member for the Labour Party on housing in London Borough of Wandsworth up until the May 2000 election for the GLA.

From May 2000 until 2004, she was a London-wide London Assembly Member, where her roles included deputy chair of the London Assembly and chair of the Assembly's Environment Committee. She was third on the Labour Party list in the 2000 London Assembly election and won a seat due to this. She led on environmental and energy issues in the Assembly, becoming the first chair of the Environment Committee, which she chaired for the whole four-year term. In the 2004 election the Labour Party failed to poll enough votes to give her a seat.

In 2003, she was the Mayor's representative on the Energy Taskforce - part of the London Sustainable Development Commission, and responsible for setting a carbon emission reduction target for London. In 2004, she became chair of the DTI / GLA London Renewables group. As lead member for the Mayor on London Waste Action, the precursor to the London Waste & Recycling Board, she facilitated funding for London's waste awareness campaign.

She wrote for various publications and spoke at numerous conferences and seminars on: community empowerment, lifestyle change, social marketing, air quality, energy, waste and other issues. For ten years, she was a National Executive Member of SERA - Labour's Environment Campaign.

Prior to joining LSx, Heath was sustainability manager for Future London, the capital's regeneration centre of excellence. She was the chief executive of London Sustainability Exchange from 2005 to 2018. She was a member and former co-chair of the London Sustainable Development Commission and was a member of the London Climate Change Partnership. She also sat on the Stratford City Environmental Review panel. She also worked eight years in academia and research and ten years in civil engineering.
