= Barnet and Camden (London Assembly constituency) =

- Territorial constituency for the London Assembly
- Barnet and Camden shown within London
- Created: 2000
- Number of members: One
- Member: Anne Clarke
- Party: Labour
- Last election: 2024
- Next election: 2028

Barnet and Camden is a territorial constituency represented on the London Assembly by one assembly member (AM). The constituency was created in 2000 at the same time as the London Assembly and has elections every four years. It consists of the combined area of the London Borough of Barnet and the London Borough of Camden. The current assembly member is Anne Clarke of the Labour Party who was elected in 2021.

== Constituency profile ==
The constituency is a 'pie slice' pairing of the large Outer London borough of Barnet with the smaller Inner London borough of Camden. It stretches from Holborn in the south to the Greater London boundary in the north. It includes parts of central London, the inner city, suburban development and a semi-rural fringe.

The seat originally was a very marginal Conservative seat, being won by the party by less than 600 votes in 2000. The result was perhaps surprising as all of the area it covered, apart from the Chipping Barnet constituency, was represented by Labour MPs at the time.

It became reasonably safer in the 2004 and 2008 elections, but was lost to Labour on a swing of almost 12% in 2012.

== Overlapping constituencies ==
The constituency includes all of the following Westminster seats:

- Chipping Barnet - Dan Tomlinson (Labour)
- Finchley and Golders Green - Sarah Sackman (Labour)
- Hendon - David Pinto-Duschinsky (Labour)
- Holborn and St. Pancras - Keir Starmer (Labour)

Barnet and Camden also includes part of the following constituency:

- Hampstead and Kilburn - Tulip Siddiq (Labour)

== Assembly members ==
The constituency returns one assembly member and is one of fourteen territorial constituencies in London. Represented from its creation in 2000 until the 2012 election by Brian Coleman, a Conservative from Barnet, former Labour MP Andrew Dismore won it from him with a swing of nearly 12%. Dismore stepped down ahead of the 2021 election and was replaced by Anne Clarke, a Labour councillor in Barnet.

Year	Member	Party
2000	Brian Coleman	Conservative
2012	Andrew Dismore	Labour
2021	Anne Clarke	Labour

== Assembly elections ==
2024 London Assembly election: Barnet and Camden
Party	Candidate	Constituency			List		
Party	Candidate	Votes	%	±%	Votes	%	±%
Labour	Anne Clarke	70,749	43.6	▲1.3	62,350	38.3	
Conservative	Julie Redmond	51,606	31.8	▼3.2	49,393	30.4	
Green	Kate Tokley	18,405	11.3	▼1.2	18,157	11.2	
Liberal Democrats	Scott Emery	12,335	7.6	▼0.4	11,751	7.2	
Reform	Raj Forhad	7,703	4.7	▲2.4	7,272	4.5	
Rejoin EU					4,457	2.7	
Socialist (GB)	Bill Martin	1,639	1.0	New			
Animal Welfare					2,555	1.6	
Britain First					1,632	1.0	
SDP					1,295	0.8	
CPA					1,282	0.8	
Independent	Laurence Fox				919	0.6	
Communist					719	0.4	
Independent	Farah London				422	0.3	
Heritage					315	0.2	
Independent	Gabe Romualdo				79	0.0	
Majority		19,143	11.8	▲4.5			
Valid votes		162,437			162,598		
Invalid votes		1,218			1,108		
Turnout		163,655	39.6	▼3.4	163,706	39.6	
Labour hold		Swing		▲2.3			

2021 London Assembly election: Barnet and Camden
Party	Candidate	Votes	%	±%
Labour	Anne Clarke	75,180	42.3	▼2.0
Conservative	Roberto Weeden-Sanz	62,178	35.0	▼0.5
Green	Kirsten De Keyser	22,180	12.5	▲3.3
Liberal Democrats	Marisha Ray	14,172	8.0	▲1.9
Reform	Mark Simpson	4,107	2.3	New
Majority		13,002	7.3	▼1.4
Total formal votes		177,817	98.4	▼0.4
Informal votes		2,821	1.6	▲0.4
Turnout		180,638	43.0	▼5.0
Labour hold		Swing	▼1.4	

2016 London Assembly election: Barnet and Camden
Party	Candidate	Votes	%	±%
Labour	Andrew Dismore	81,482	44.3	−0.4
Conservative	Dan Thomas	65,242	35.5	+3.6
Green	Stephen Taylor	16,996	9.2	−1.5
Liberal Democrats	Zack Polanski	11,204	6.1	−2.2
UKIP	Joseph Langton	9,057	4.9	+0.5
Majority		16,240	8.7	−4.1
Total formal votes		183,981	98.8	+0.4
Informal votes		2,050	1.2	−0.4
Turnout		186,031	48.0	+10.0
Labour hold		Swing		

2012 London Assembly election: Barnet and Camden
Party	Candidate	Votes	%	±%
Labour	Andrew Dismore	74,677	44.7	+14.7
Conservative	Brian Coleman	53,378	31.9	−9.2
Green	Audrey Poppy	17,904	10.7	+1.2
Liberal Democrats	Chris Richards	13,800	8.3	−4.3
UKIP	Michael Corby	7,331	4.4	+2.3
Majority		21,299	12.8	N/A
Total formal votes		167,090	98.4	
Informal votes		2,671	1.6	
Turnout		169,761	38.0	−9.8
Labour gain from Conservative		Swing	-11.9	

2008 London Assembly election: Barnet and Camden
Party	Candidate	Votes	%	±%
Conservative	Brian Coleman	72,659	40.4	+7.0
Labour	Nicky Gavron	52,966	29.4	+4.1
Liberal Democrats	Nick Russell	22,213	12.3	−4.3
Green	Miranda Dunn	16,782	9.3	+0.9
UKIP	Magnus Nielsen	3,678	2.0	−4.1
Christian (CPA)	Clement Adebayo	3,536	2.0	New
English Democrat	David Stevens	2,146	1.2	New
Left List	Dave Hoefing	2,074	1.2	New
Veritas	Graham Dare	510	0.3	New
Majority		19,693	11.0	+2.9
Turnout		180,007	47.8	+9.4
Conservative hold		Swing	+1.25	

2004 London Assembly election: Barnet and Camden
Party	Candidate	Votes	%	±%
Conservative	Brian Coleman	47,640	33.4	+0.5
Labour	Lucy Anderson	36,121	25.3	−7.2
Liberal Democrats	Jonathan Simpson	23,603	16.6	−1.0
Green	Miranda Dunn	11,921	8.4	−3.3
UKIP	Magnus Nielsen	8,685	6.1	+4.4
Respect	Elisabeth Wheatley	5,150	3.6	New
Majority		11,519	8.1	+7.7
Turnout		135,034	39.4	+4.4
Conservative hold		Swing	+4.05	

2000 London Assembly election: Barnet and Camden
Party	Candidate	Votes	%	±%
Conservative	Brian Coleman	41,583	32.9	N/A
Labour	Helen Gordon	41,032	32.5	N/A
Liberal Democrats	Jonathan Davies	22,295	17.6	N/A
Green	Miranda Dunn	14,768	11.7	N/A
London Socialist	Candy Udwin	3,488	2.8	N/A
UKIP	Magnus Nielsen	2,115	1.7	N/A
Maharishi's Natural Programmes	Diane Derksen	1,081	0.9	N/A
Majority		551	0.4	N/A
Turnout		136,384	35.0	N/A
Conservative win (new seat)				

== Mayoral election results ==
Below are the results for the candidate which received the highest share of the popular vote in the constituency at each mayoral election.

Year	Party	Candidate
2000	Independent	Ken Livingstone
2004	Labour	Ken Livingstone
2008	Conservative	Boris Johnson
2012	Conservative	Boris Johnson
2016	Labour	Sadiq Khan
2021	Labour	Sadiq Khan
2024	Labour	Sadiq Khan

2024 London mayoral election (Barnet and Camden)
Party	Candidate	Votes	%	±%
Labour	Sadiq Khan	70,984	43.5	N/A
Conservative	Susan Hall	57,465	35.2	N/A
Green	Zoë Garbett	9,044	5.55	N/A
Liberal Democrats	Rob Blackie	8,480	5.2	N/A
Reform	Howard Cox	4,266	2.62	N/A
Independent	Natalie Campbell	2,810	1.72	N/A
SDP	Amy Gallagher	1,987	1.22	N/A
Animal Welfare	Femy Amin	1,833	1.12	N/A
Count Binface for Mayor of London	Count Binface	1,701	1.04	N/A
Independent	Andreas Michli	1,669	1.02	N/A
Independent	Tarun Ghulati	1,251	0.767	N/A
Britain First	Nick Scanlon	1086	0.666	N/A
London Real	Brian Rose	479	0.294	N/A
Turnout		163,825	39.6%	−4.24%
Rejected ballots		770		
Registered electors		413,809		+0.358%

2021 London mayoral election (Barnet and Camden)
Party	Candidate	1st round		2nd round			1st round votesTransfer votes, 2nd round
Party	Candidate	Total	Of round	Transfers	Total	Of round	1st round votesTransfer votes, 2nd round
Labour	Sadiq Khan	67,610	38.7%				
Conservative	Shaun Bailey	65,822	37.6%				
Green	Siân Berry	13,934	7.97%				
Liberal Democrats	Luisa Porritt	7,689	4.4%				
Reclaim	Laurence Fox	3,120	1.78%				
Independent	Niko Omilana	2,705	1.55%				
London Real	Brian Rose	2,120	1.21%				
Rejoin EU	Richard Hewison	1,975	1.13%				
Count Binface for Mayor of London	Count Binface	1,672	0.956%				
Women's Equality	Mandu Reid	1,499	0.857%				
Let London Live	Piers Corbyn	1,259	0.72%				
Animal Welfare	Vanessa Hudson	1,119	0.64%				
Heritage	David Kurten	711	0.407%				
UKIP	Peter John Gammons	692	0.396%				
Independent	Farah London	614	0.351%				
SDP	Steve Kelleher	599	0.342%				
Independent	Nims Obunge	547	0.313%				
Independent	Max Fosh	459	0.262%				
Renew	Kam Balayev	431	0.246%				
Burning Pink	Valerie Brown	322	0.184%				
Turnout		180,710	43.8%				
Registered electors		412,332					

2016 London mayoral election (Barnet and Camden)
Party	Candidate	1st round		2nd round			1st round votesTransfer votes, 2nd round
Party	Candidate	Total	Of round	Transfers	Total	Of round	1st round votesTransfer votes, 2nd round
Labour	Sadiq Khan	74,927	40.9%				
Conservative	Zac Goldsmith	73,722	40.3%				
Green	Siân Berry	11,239	6.14%				
Liberal Democrats	Caroline Pidgeon	7,858	4.29%				
UKIP	Peter Whittle	4,446	2.43%				
Women's Equality	Sophie Walker	4,403	2.4%				
Respect	George Galloway	2,095	1.14%				
Britain First	Paul Golding	1,428	0.78%				
Cannabis is Safer than Alcohol	Lee Eli Harris	1,378	0.752%				
Independent	Prince Zylinski	760	0.415%				
BNP	David Furness	601	0.328%				
One Love	Ankit Love	267	0.146%				
Turnout		186,098	48.1%				
Registered electors		387,226					

2012 London mayoral election (Barnet and Camden)
Party	Candidate	1st round		2nd round			1st round votesTransfer votes, 2nd round
Party	Candidate	Total	Of round	Transfers	Total	Of round	1st round votesTransfer votes, 2nd round
Conservative	Boris Johnson	82,839	49.4%				
Labour	Ken Livingstone	58,354	34.8%				
Green	Jenny Jones	8,809	5.25%				
Independent	Siobhan Benita	6,986	4.16%				
Liberal Democrats	Brian Paddick	6,834	4.07%				
UKIP	Lawrence Webb	2,562	1.53%				
BNP	Carlos Cortiglia	1,409	0.84%				
Turnout		170,318	38.2%				
Registered electors		446,248					

2008 London mayoral election (Barnet and Camden)
Party	Candidate	1st round		2nd round			1st round votesTransfer votes, 2nd round
Party	Candidate	Total	Of round	Transfers	Total	Of round	1st round votesTransfer votes, 2nd round
Conservative	Boris Johnson	81,718	45.9%				
Labour	Ken Livingstone	63,912	35.9%				
Liberal Democrats	Brian Paddick	17,606	9.89%				
Green	Siân Berry	6,936	3.9%				
BNP	Richard Barnbrook	2,778	1.56%				
Christian Choice	Alan Craig	1,884	1.06%				
Left List	Lindsey German	1,251	0.703%				
UKIP	Gerard Batten	1,036	0.582%				
English Democrat	Matt O'Connor	587	0.33%				
Independent	Winston McKenzie	276	0.155%				
Turnout		180,436	47.9%				
Registered electors		376,818					

2004 London mayoral election (Barnet and Camden)
Party	Candidate	1st round		2nd round			1st round votesTransfer votes, 2nd round
Party	Candidate	Total	Of round	Transfers	Total	Of round	1st round votesTransfer votes, 2nd round
Labour	Ken Livingstone	52,360	37.7%				
Conservative	Steve Norris	46,353	33.4%				
Liberal Democrats	Simon Hughes	20,086	14.5%				
UKIP	Frank Maloney	5,904	4.25%				
Green	Darren Johnson	4,892	3.52%				
Respect	Lindsey German	3,604	2.59%				
BNP	Julian Leppert	2,620	1.89%				
CPA	Ram Gidoomal	2,098	1.51%				
Independent Working Class Action	Lorna Reid	612	0.44%				
Independent	Tammy Nagalingam	410	0.295%				
Turnout		142,491	38.4%				
Registered electors		371,248					

2000 London mayoral election (Barnet and Camden)
Party	Candidate	1st round		2nd round			1st round votesTransfer votes, 2nd round
Party	Candidate	Total	Of round	Transfers	Total	Of round	1st round votesTransfer votes, 2nd round
Independent	Ken Livingstone	51,649	38.8%				
Conservative	Steve Norris	36,826	27.7%				
Liberal Democrats	Susan Kramer	17,096	12.9%				
Labour	Frank Dobson	16,978	12.8%				
Green	Darren Johnson	3,564	2.68%				
CPA	Ram Gidoomal	2,336	1.76%				
BNP	Michael Newland	1,451	1.09%				
Pro-Motorist Small Shop	Geoffrey Ben-Nathan	1,055	0.793%				
UKIP	Damian Hockney	972	0.731%				
Independent	Ashwin Kumar	708	0.532%				
Natural Law	Geoffrey Clements	397	0.298%				
Turnout		135,545	37.6%				
Registered electors		360,704					
