= Alison Moore (politician) =

British politician

Mayor of Barnet
- In office 24 May 2022 – 23 May 2023
- Preceded by: Alison Cornelius
- Succeeded by: Nagus Narenthira

Councillor for East Finchley
- Incumbent
- Assumed office 7 May 1998
- Preceded by: Helen Gordon

Member of the London Assembly as an additional member
- In office 25 March 2020 – 6 May 2021
- Preceded by: Tom Copley
- Succeeded by: Elly Baker

Personal details
- Party: Labour

Alison Moore is a British Labour politician and was Mayor of Barnet from May 2022 to May 2023. Moore served as a member of the London Assembly from March 2020 to May 2021.

== Political career ==
Moore has been a councillor on Barnet London Borough Council since 1998 for the East Finchley ward. Moore is a former Leader of the Labour Group on Barnet Council. She also stood as the Labour candidate for Finchley and Golders Green in 2010.

Moore took over the seat of Tom Copley, who resigned from the Assembly following his appointment as Deputy Mayor for Housing and Residential Development by Sadiq Khan. She was co-opted into the Assembly along with Murad Qureshi. She did not stand for re-election in the 2021 London Assembly election.

Councillor Alison Moore became the 57th Mayor of Barnet after being officially sworn in during the Annual Council Meeting held on Tuesday 24 May 2022 at Hendon Town Hall following the council election in which Labour had won control of the council for the first time.

=== Committee assignments ===
Moore has the following assignments in the 2020-21 session:

- Chair of the Transport Committee
- Member of the Audit Panel
- Member of the Budget and Performance Committee
- Member of the Confirmation Hearings Committee
- Member of the Fire, Resilience and Emergency Planning Committee

== Electoral history ==
General election 2010: Finchley and Golders Green
Party	Candidate	Votes	%	±%
Conservative	Mike Freer	21,688	46.0	+6.2
Labour	Alison Moore	15,879	33.7	−5.4
Liberal Democrats	Laura Edge	8,036	17.0	−0.1
UKIP	Susan Cummins	817	1.7	+0.6
Green	Donald Lyven	737	1.6	−1.0
Majority		5,809	12.3	N/A
Turnout		47,157	61.1	N/A
Registered electors		70,722		
Conservative win (new boundaries)				
