= 2012 London Assembly election =

- 3 May 2012

All 25 seats in the London Assembly 13 seats needed for majority
- Turnout: 37.4% ▼6.9%
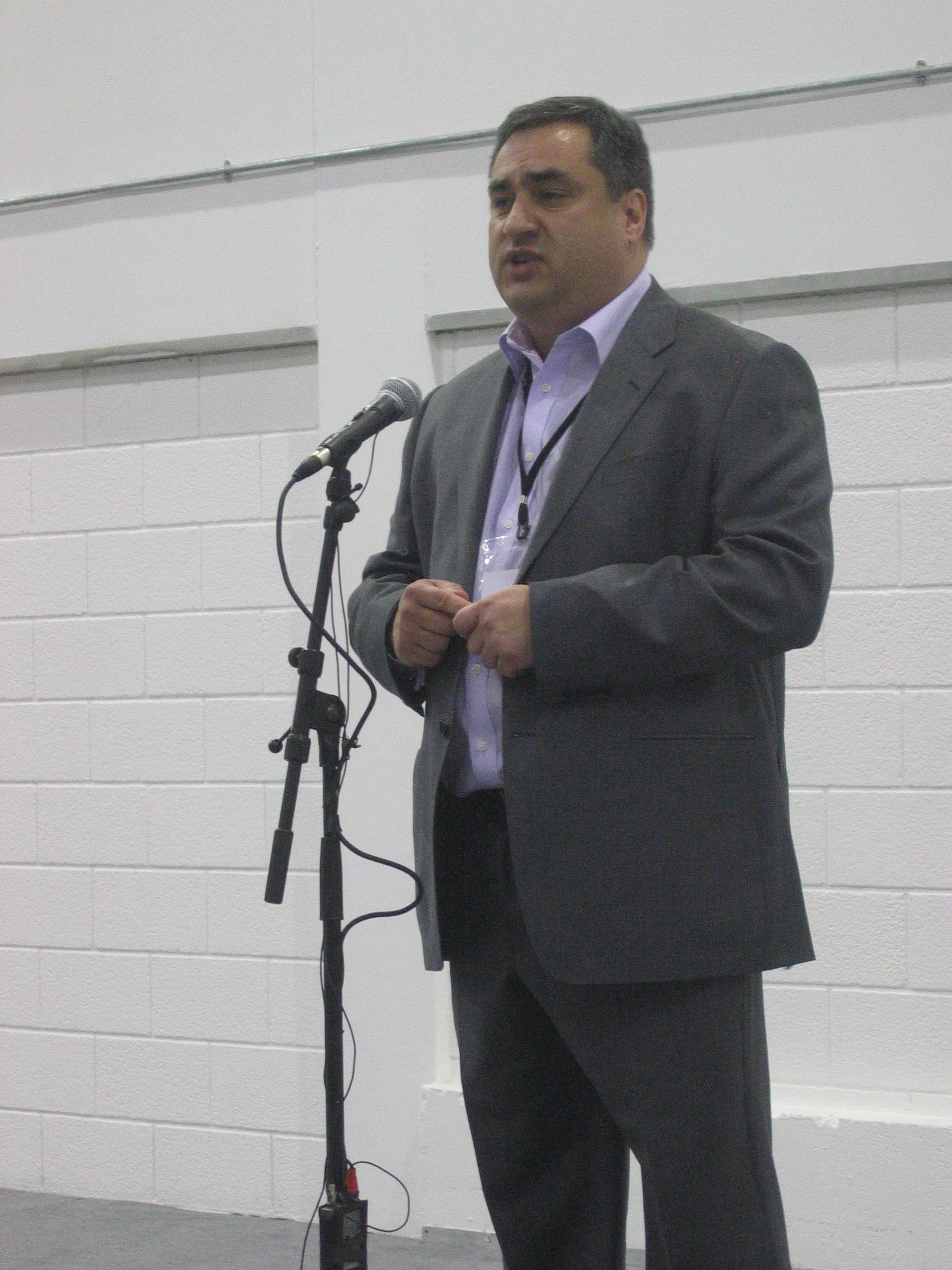

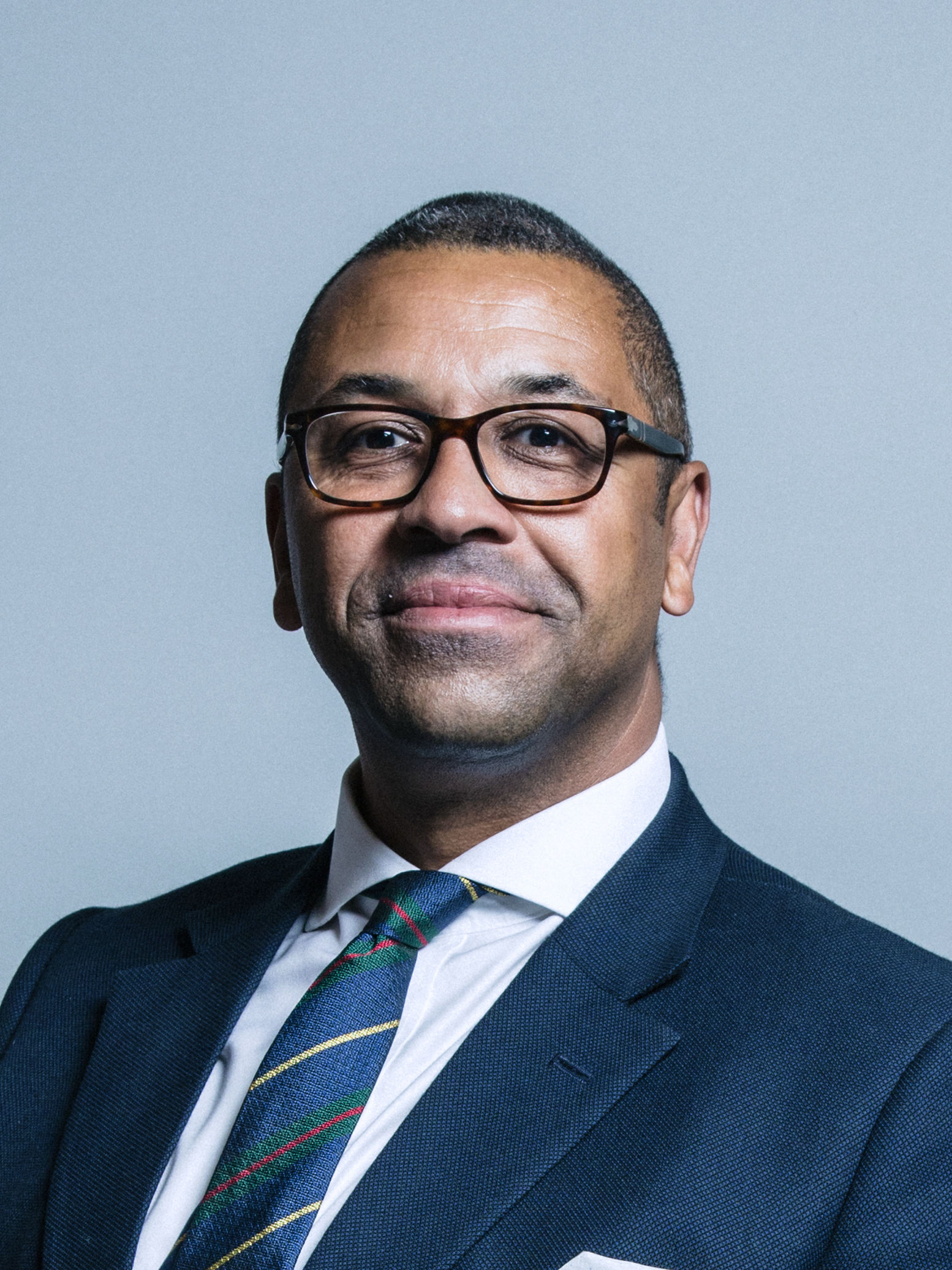

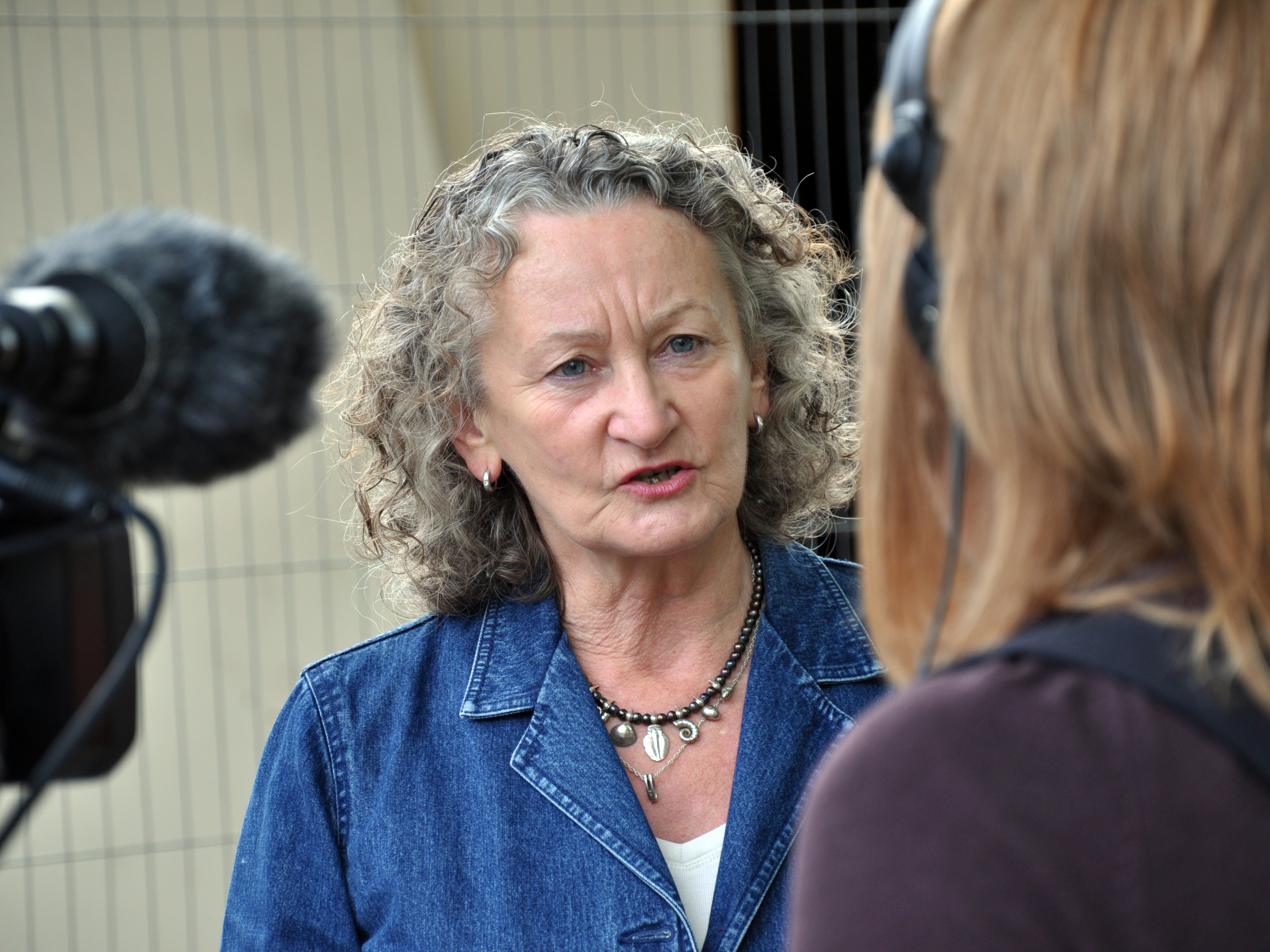

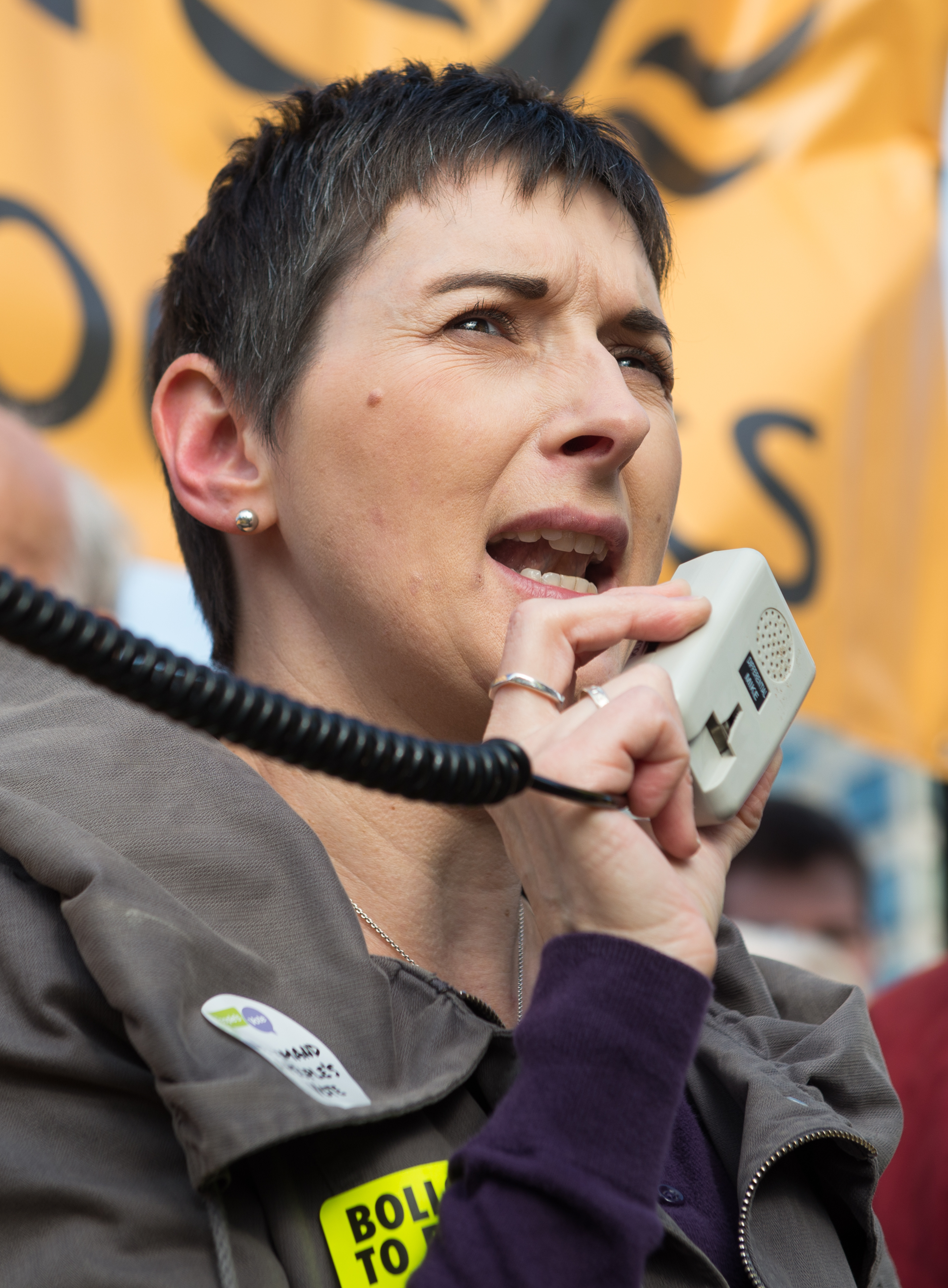
	First party	Second party
Leader	Len Duvall	James Cleverly
Party	Labour	Conservative
Leader's seat	Greenwich and Lewisham	Bexley and Bromley
Last election	8 seats	11 seats
Seats won	12	9
Seat change	▲4	▼2
Constituency vote	933,438	722,280
% and swing	42.3% ▲14.3%	32.7% ▼1.6%
Party vote	911,204	708,528
% and swing	41.1% ▲13.5%	32.0% ▼2.6%
	Third party	Fourth party
Leader	Jenny Jones	Caroline Pidgeon
Party	Green	Liberal Democrats
Leader's seat	Additional member	Additional member
Last election	2 seats	3 seats
Seats won	2	2
Seat change	Steady	▼1
Constituency vote	188,623	193,842
% and swing	8.5% ▲0.5%	8.8% ▼4.9%
Party vote	189,215	150,447
% and swing	8.5% ▲0.1%	6.8% ▼4.6%

The London Assembly election of 2012 was an election of members to the London Assembly which took place on Thursday, 3 May 2012, the same day as the 2012 London mayoral election, and the 2012 United Kingdom local elections. Although Conservative candidate Boris Johnson won the Mayoral election, the Assembly election produced the Labour Party's best result since the inception of the London Assembly; this was subsequently surpassed by the party's performance in the 2016 election.

== Overview ==
The Assembly is elected by the Additional Member System. There are fourteen directly elected constituencies, all of which have, to date, only ever been won by the Conservative Party or the Labour Party. An additional eleven "London members" are allocated by a London wide top-up vote with the proviso that parties must win at least five percent of the vote to qualify for the list seats.

All registered electors (British, Irish, Commonwealth and European Union citizens) living in London who were aged 18 or over on Thursday 3 May 2012 were entitled to vote in the Assembly election. Those who were temporarily away from London (for example, away working, on holiday, in student accommodation or in hospital) were also entitled to vote in the Assembly election. The deadline to register to vote in the election was midnight on Wednesday 18 April 2012, though anyone who qualified as an anonymous elector had until midnight on Thursday 26 April 2012 to register.

== Candidates ==
=== Constituency candidates ===
Constituency	Conservative	Labour	Green	Lib Dems	UKIP (Note: UKIP candidates appeared on the ballot paper under their alternative registered description "Fresh Choice for London" rather than as "UKIP".)	BNP	Others
Barnet & Camden	Brian Coleman (I) (53,378, 2nd)	Andrew Dismore (74,677, 1st)	A.M. Poppy (17,904, 3rd)	Chris Richards (13,800, 4th)	Michael Corby (7,331, 5th)		
Bexley & Bromley	James Cleverly (I) (88,482, 1st)	Josie Channer (40,714, 2nd)	Jonathan Rooks (9,209, 5th)	Sam Webber (11,396, 3rd)	David Coburn (10,771, 4th)	Donna Treanor (7,563, 6th)	
Brent & Harrow	Sachin Rajput (40,604, 2nd)	Navin Shah (I) (70,400, 1st)	Shahrar Ali (10,546, 4th)	Charlotte Henry (15,690, 3rd)	Mick McGough (7,830, 5th)		
City & East	John Moss (24,923, 2nd)	John Biggs (I) (107,667, 1st)	Chris Smith (10,891, 3rd)	Richard Macmillan (7,351, 4th)	Steven Woolfe (5,243, 7th)	Paul Borg (7,031, 5th)	Kamran Malik (CUP) (6,774, 6th); Paul Davies (Comm. League) (1,108, 8th)
Croydon & Sutton	Steve O'Connell (I) (60,152, 1st)	Louisa Woodley (50,734, 2nd)	Gordon Ross (10,287, 5th)	Abigail Lock (21,889, 3rd)	Winston McKenzie (10,757, 4th)		
Ealing & Hillingdon	Richard Barnes (I) (62,474, 2nd)	Onkar Sahota (65,584, 1st)	Mike Harling (10,877, 4th)	Mike Cox (11,805, 3rd)	Helen Knight (6,750, 5th)	David Furness (4,284, 6th)	Ian Edward (NF) (2,035, 7th)
Enfield & Haringey	Andy Hemsted (37,293, 2nd)	Joanne McCartney (I) (74,034, 1st)	Peter Krakowiak (12,278, 4th)	Dawn Barnes (13,601, 3rd)	Peter Staveley (4,298, 5th)	Marie Nicholas (3,081, 6th)	
Greenwich & Lewisham	Alex Wilson (27,329, 2nd)	Len Duvall (I) (65,366, 1st)	Roger Sedgley (12,427, 3rd)	John Russell (9,393, 4th)	Paul Oakley (4,997, 6th)	Roberta Woods (3,551, 7th)	Barbara Raymond (PBP) (6,873, 5th); Tess Culnane (NF) (1,816, 8th)
Havering & Redbridge	Roger Evans (I) (53,285, 1st)	Mandy Richards (49,386, 2nd)	Haroon Said (5,207, 7th)	Farrukh Islam (6,435, 5th)	Lawrence Webb (9,471, 3rd)	Robert Taylor (5,234, 6th)	Malvin Brown (Res. Assoc. London) (8,239, 4th); Mark Twiddy (Eng. Dem.) (2,573, 8th); Richard Edmonds (NF) (1,936, 9th)
Lambeth & Southwark	Michael Mitchell (30,537, 2nd)	Val Shawcross (I) (83,239, 1st)	Jonathan Bartley (18,144, 4th)	Rob Blackie (18,359, 3rd)	James Fluss (4,395, 5th)		Danny Lambert (SPGB) (2,938, 6th)
Merton & Wandsworth	Richard Tracey (I) (65,197, 1st)	Leonie Cooper (55,216, 2nd)	Roy Vickery (11,307, 4th)	Lisa Smart (11,904, 3rd)	Mazhar Manzoor (3,717, 5th)		Thamilini Kulendran (Ind) (2,424, 6th); Bill Martin (SPGB) (1,343, 7th)
North East	Naomi Newstead (35,714, 2nd)	Jennette Arnold (I) (101,902, 1st)	Caroline Allen (29,677, 3rd)	Farooq Qureshi (13,237, 4th)	Paul Wiffen (6,623, 5th)		Ijaz Hayat (Ind) (4,842, 6th)
South West	Tony Arbour (I) (69,151, 1st)	Lisa Homan (49,889, 2nd)	Daniel Goldsmith (17,070, 4th)	Munira Wilson (28,947, 3rd)	Jeff Bolter (8,505, 5th)		
West Central	Kit Malthouse (I) (73,761, 1st)	Todd Foreman (44,630, 2nd)	Susanna Rustin (12,799, 3rd)	Layla Moran (10,035, 4th)	Elizabeth Jones (5,161, 5th)		
Source: London Elects

=== London-wide List Candidates ===
2012 London Assembly election: Additional members
List	Candidates	Votes	Of total (%)	± from prev.
Labour	Nicky Gavron, Murad Qureshi, Fiona Twycross, Tom Copley, Florence Nosegbe, Unmesh Desai, Kirsten Hearn, Liquat Ali, Mabel McKeown, Kevin McGrath, Christine Quigley	911,204	41.1	▲9.1
Conservative	Andrew Boff, Gareth Bacon, Victoria Borwick, Suella Fernandes, Kemi Badenoch, Matthew Maxwell-Scott, Nadia Sharif, Anthony Hughes, Andrew Stranack, Karim Sacoor, Amandeep Bhogal, Chris Hampsheir	708,528	32.0	▼7.3
Green	Jenny Jones, Darren Johnson, Noel Lynch, Natalie Bennett, Shahrar Ali, Farid Bakht, Caroline Allen, Romayne Phoenix, Caroline Russell, Anna Hughes, Marek Powley	189,215	8.5	▼1.1
Liberal Democrats	Caroline Pidgeon, Stephen Knight, Bridget Fox, Shas Sheehan, Merlene Emerson, Emily Gasson, Steve Bradley, Marisha Ray, Nick Russell, Ajmal Masroor, Chris Richards	150,447	6.8	▲4.9
UKIP	Steven Woolfe, David Coburn, Lawrence Webb, Helen Dixon, Elizabeth Jones, Paul Oakley, Jeff Bolter, Mick McGough, Winston McKenzie, Peter Staveley, Mazhar Manzoor	100,040	4.5	▲2.1
BNP	Steve Squire, Dave Furness, Paul Sturdy, Carlos Cortiglia, John Clark, Robert Taylor, Giuseppe de Santis, Donna Treanor, Roberta Woods, Marie Nicholas, John Brooks	47,024	2.1	▼3.9
CPA	Malcolm Martin, Sue May, Sid Cordle, Flora Amar, William Capstick, Ethel Odiete, Matthew Connolly, Denise Stafford, Mary Boyle, Vivek Trivedi, Ellen Greco, Francis Olawale, Robert Hampson, Rita Isingoma, Stan Gain, Ruth Price, Stephen Hammond, Charles Mrewa, Benny Stafford, Doreen Scrimshaw, Jonathan Rudd, Tony May, Katherine Mills, Roger Glencross, Faith Miuq	38,758	1.8	▼1.5
English Democrat	Roger Cooper, Steven Uncles, Benjamin Weald, Leo Brookes, Janus Polenceus, Mark Twiddy, Michael Barnbrook, Brian Cakebread	22,025	1.0	▼0.21
TUSC	Roger Cooper, Steven Uncles, Benjamin Weald, Leo Brookes, Janus Polenceus, Mark Twiddy, Michael Barnbrook, Brian Cakebread	17,686	0.8	New
Independent	Ijaz Hayat	9,114	0.4	New
House Party	Terence McGrenera	8,126	0.4	New
National Front	Tess Culnane, Ian Edward, Andrew Cripps	8,006	0.4	New
Independent	Rathy Alagaratnam	4,835	0.2	▼0.03

== Opinion Polls ==
=== Constituency ===
Date(s) conducted	Polling organisation/client	Sample	Con	Lab	Lib Dem	Others
3 May 2012	Election results	2,207,677	32.7%	42.3%	8.8%	16.2%
30 Apr - 2 May 2012	YouGov	2,119	33%	44%	9%	14%
27 - 29 Apr 2012	YouGov	1,231	32%	45%	8%	15%
18 – 24 Apr 2012	Survation	1,443	30%	33%	13%	23%
20 - 22 Apr 2012	YouGov	1,138	34%	46%	9%	11%
13 - 15 Apr 2012	YouGov	1,060	35%	44%	11%	10%
1 May 2008	Election results	2,406,289	37.4%	28.0%	13.7%	20.9%

=== Regional ===
Date(s) conducted	Polling organisation/client	Sample	Con	Lab	Lib Dem	Green	Others
3 May 2012	Election results	2,215,008	32.0%	41.1%	6.8%	8.5%	11.6%
30 Apr - 2 May 2012	YouGov	2,119	32%	42%	9%	7%	11%
27 - 29 Apr 2012	YouGov	1,231	30%	44%	8%	5%	13%
18 – 24 Apr 2012	Survation	1,443	28%	33%	10%	8%	21%
20 - 22 Apr 2012	YouGov	1,138	33%	44%	9%	6%	6%
13 - 15 Apr 2012	YouGov	1,060	35%	46%	9%	3%	7%
1 May 2008	Election results	2,412,607	34.1%	27.1%	11.2%	8.3%	17.6%

== Results ==

London Assembly election, 2012
Parties	Additional member system										Total seats		
Parties	Constituency					Region					Total seats		
Parties	Votes	%	+/−	Seats	+/−	Votes	%	+/−	Seats	+/−	Total	+/−	%
Labour	933,438	42.3	▲14.3	8	▲2	911,204	41.1	▲13.5	4	▲2	12	▲4	48.0
Conservative	722,280	32.7	▼1.6	6	▼2	708,528	32.0	▼2.6	3	Steady	9	▼2	36.0
Green	188,623	8.5	▲0.5	0	Steady	189,215	8.5	▲0.1	2	Steady	2	Steady	8.0
Liberal Democrats	193,842	8.8	▼4.9	0	Steady	150,447	6.8	▼4.6	2	▼1	2	▼1	8.0
UK Independence Party	95,849	4.3	▲1.4	0	Steady	100,040	4.5	▲2.6	0	Steady	0	Steady	-
BNP	30,744	1.4	▲0.6	0	Steady	47,024	2.1	▼3.3	0	Steady	0	▼1	-
CPA	-	-	-	-	-	38,758	1.8	▼1.1	0	Steady	0	Steady	-
English Democrat	2,573	0.1	▼1.4	0	Steady	22,025	1.0	▼0.1	0	Steady	0	Steady	-
TUSC	-	-	-	-	-	17,686	0.8	New	0	Steady	0	Steady	-
Ijaz Hayat	4,842	0.2	New	0	Steady	9,114	0.4	New	0	Steady	0	Steady	-
The House Party	-	-	-	-	-	8,126	0.4	New	0	Steady	0	Steady	-
National Front	5,787	0.3	▼1.1	0	Steady	8,006	0.4	New	0	Steady	0	Steady	-
Rathy Alagaratnam	-	-	-	-	-	4,835	0.2	▲0.1	0	Steady	0	Steady	-
Residents' Association of London	8,239	0.4	New	0	Steady	-	-	-	-	-	-	Steady	-
People Before Profit	6,873	0.3	New	0	Steady	-	-	-	-	-	-	Steady	-
Communities United	6,774	0.3	New	0	Steady	-	-	-	-	-	-	Steady	-
Socialist (GB)	4,281	0.2	▲0.1	0	Steady	-	-	-	-	-	-	Steady	-
Thamilini Kulendran	2,424	0.1	New	0	Steady	-	-	-	-	-	-	Steady	-
Communist League	1,108	0.1	N/A	0	Steady	-	-	-	-	-	-	Steady	-
Total	2,207,677			14		2,215,008			11		25		

Constituency Vote
Labour	42.3%
Conservative	32.7%
Liberal Democrats	8.8%
Green	8.5%
Others	7.7%

Regional Vote
Labour	41.1%
Conservative	32.0%
Green	8.5%
Liberal Democrats	6.8%
Others	11.6%

Assembly seats
Labour	48.0%
Conservative	36.0%
Green	8.0%
Liberal Democrats	8.0%

== See also ==
- Greater London Authority
- Mayor of London
