= Murad Qureshi =

British Labour and Co-operative Party politician (born 1965)

- মুরাদ কোরেশী
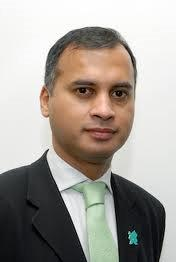
- Qureshi in April 2012

Member of the London Assembly as an additional member
- In office 25 March 2020 – 6 May 2021
- Preceded by: Fiona Twycross
- Succeeded by: Zack Polanski
- Preceded by: Nicky Gavron
- Succeeded by: Fiona Twycross

Member of the London Assembly as an additional member
- In office 10 June 2004 – 6 May 2016
- Preceded by: Samantha Heath
- Succeeded by: David Kurten

Personal details
- Born: 27 May 1965 (age 61) Greater Manchester, Lancashire, England
- Party: Labour Co-op
- Education: MSc Environmental Economics; University of East Anglia (BA); University College London (MSc)
- Profession: Politician
- Website: www.muradqureshi.com

Murad Qureshi (Bengali: মুরাদ কোরেশী; born 27 May 1965) is a British former Labour and Co-operative Party politician, and a former Member of the London Assembly.

== Early life and education ==
Qureshi was born in Greater Manchester, in north-west England, but he was brought up in Westminster, London, where his parents moved in July 1965. He attended Quintin Kynaston School and graduated from the University of East Anglia with a degree in Development Studies in 1987, before undertaking an MSc in Environmental Economics at University College London, which he completed in 1993.

Qureshi is of Bangladeshi descent, and comes from a politically active family: his late father Mushtaq Qureshi was a Labour Party councillor in the City of Westminster and was a freedom fighter in the Bangladesh War of Liberation. His youngest sister, Papya Qureshi, was also a councillor in Westminster.

== Career ==
Before becoming an Assembly Member, he worked in Housing and Regeneration for 15 years, helping establish housing associations and co-ops in the East End.

He was an executive committee member of SERA from 1994 to 2000 and a former board member of BRAC U.K, an international NGO seeking to alleviate poverty and empower the poor.

In 2018 it was reported that Jeremy Corbyn had intended to propose Qureshi for a peerage.

=== Politics ===
Qureshi was a councillor for Church Street on Westminster City Council from 1998 to 2006, and was elected on the Labour Party's party list to the London Assembly at the 2004 Assembly election. He was re-elected at the 2008 election and again at the 2012 Assembly election. He failed to be re-elected at the 2016 election; because Labour gained constituency seats, it lost seats from its party list, which Qureshi was on.

In 2005, he was described as "the only Muslim member" of the London Assembly, although he supports Amartya Sen's theory of plural identities and has criticised the practice of individuals "defining themselves simply by their religion, without taking into account other key aspects of their identity".

Qureshi was Chair of the London Assembly's Environment Committee and a Member of the Transport Committee. He was also a member of the London Fire and Emergency Planning Authority, which oversees the London Fire Brigade between 2004–2012 and Chair of the Mayor's London Waterways Commission, since its inception. From 2004 to 2006, Qureshi was a member of the Metropolitan Police Authority.

Under his chairmanship of the Environment Committee at the London Assembly, a body of work emerged against expansion of Heathrow airport work and its adverse environmental impact on Londoners' quality of life, particularly in west London suburbs, including reports "Plane Speaking" (2012) and "Flights of Fancy" (2010), plus consultation responses on the Government's Draft Aviation Policy Framework (2012), and more recently against night flights.

"Flights of Fancy", produced before the general election in May 2010, argued against Labour government keenness to have a third runway at Heathrow. Since losing that general election, the Labour Party has dropped its position on the expansion of Heathrow airport.

As an Assembly Member, he has undertaken rapporteurships into pedicabs (cycle rickshaws) and the loss of London's playing fields. The latter report called for Sport England to be consulted on all applications for developments on playing fields measuring 0.2 hectares or more, a policy which has since been adopted by the Department for Communities and Local Government.

Qureshi lost his seat in 2016, but returned to the assembly in 2020 following the resignation of Fiona Twycross. He was third on the Labour list for the 2021 election, and was not re-elected.

At the 2018 and 2022 local elections, Qureshi stood in Little Venice ward on Westminster City Council, but was unsuccessful on both occasions.

== Campaigns and activities ==
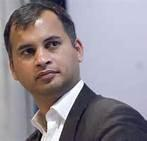
Murad Qureshi

Among his campaigns, Qureshi has called for the inclusion of Twenty20 cricket in the 2012 Olympic Games, a proposal which received the backing of the London Assembly, and he has advocated the use of blue lines to mark the courses of London's underground rivers.

He has called for Edgware Road tube station (Bakerloo Line) to be renamed after Church Street Market, as this would end the confusion between that station and the namesake station on the Circle, District and Hammersmith & City lines.

Qureshi has worked for many years to raise awareness of the crucial role of remittances in international development with his last letter in the Financial Times generating much debate. In 2004, remittances was the key topic on which he presented evidence before the House of Commons International Development Committee as part of a submission by the British Bangladeshi International Development Group.

In 2007, Qureshi hosted a meeting at City Hall which launched the Cambridge IGCSEs in Bangladesh, Pakistan and India Studies with Amartya Sen's support. Qureshi closely follows political developments in South Asia, and was in Bangladesh for the parliamentary elections in December 2008.

He is Chairman of Capital SERA, the London branch of the Socialist Environment and Resources Association. Qureshi is also a former chair of the Stop the War Coalition. He has contributed regular columns to the Morning Star, The China Daily, Tribune and the Westminster Extra.

Qureshi has had a music record named after him, and financially backed a British film, Shongram, a romantic drama set during the 1971 Bangladesh Liberation struggle.

== Personal life ==
Qureshi lists his recreations as "football and cricket (playing and watching)".

== See also ==
- British Bangladeshi
- List of British Bangladeshis
- List of ethnic minority politicians in the United Kingdom
