= Fiona Twycross, Baroness Twycross =

British politician (born 1969)

The Right Honourable The Baroness Twycross
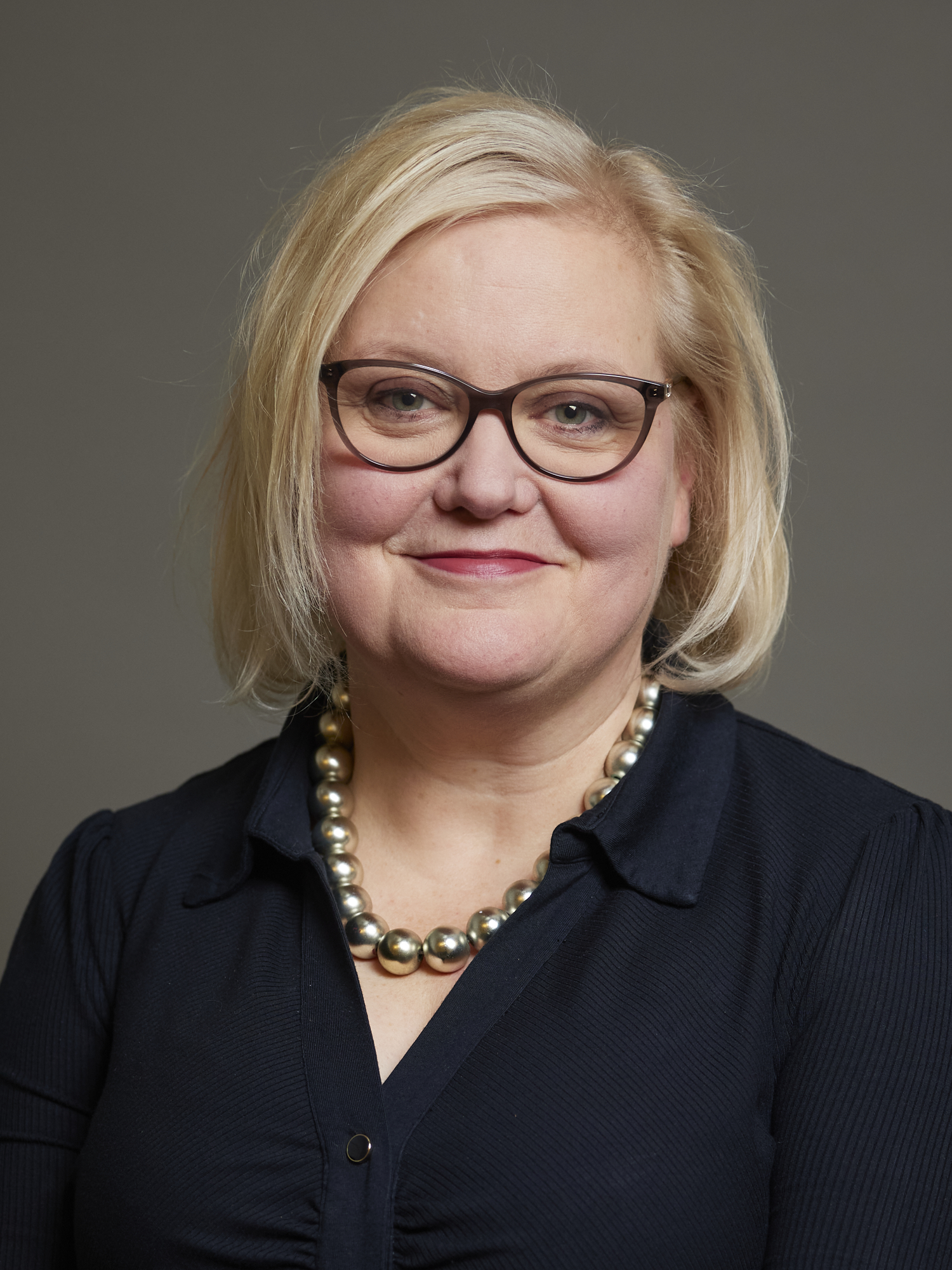
- Official portrait, 2023

Parliamentary Under-Secretary of State for Heritage (Note: Heritage and Gambling until September 2025, Parliamentary Under-Secretary of State for Museums, Heritage and Gambling September 2025–July 2026)
- Incumbent
- Assumed office 23 July 2024
- Prime Minister: Keir Starmer; Andy Burnham
- Preceded by: Stuart Andrew

Parliamentary Secretary for the Cabinet Office
- Incumbent
- Assumed office 22 July 2026
- Prime Minister: Andy Burnham
- Preceded by: The Baroness Anderson of Stoke-on-Trent

Baroness-in-Waiting Government Whip
- Incumbent
- Assumed office 11 July 2024
- Prime Minister: Keir Starmer

Deputy Mayor for Fire and Resilience
- In office 1 April 2018 – 10 May 2024
- Mayor: Sadiq Khan
- Preceded by: Office created
- Succeeded by: Jules Pipe

Member of the House of Lords
- Lord Temporal
- Life peerage 7 November 2022

Member of the London Assembly as an additional member
- In office 3 May 2012 – 22 March 2020
- Preceded by: Caroline Pidgeon
- Succeeded by: Murad Qureshi
- Constituency: 8th additional member (2012–2016); 6th additional member (2016–2020)

Personal details
- Born: Fiona Ruth Twycross; 29 May 1969 (age 57)
- Party: Labour
- Education: University of Edinburgh (PhD); Birkbeck, University of London

Fiona Ruth Twycross, Baroness Twycross (born 29 May 1969) is a British Labour Party politician. She has been a parliamentary under-secretary of state at the Department for Digital, Culture, Media and Sport and a parliamentary secretary for the Cabinet Office since July 2026.

== Early life ==
Twycross was born in South London before moving to Oxford. She studied at Cheney School in Oxford before going on to study Scandinavian Studies at the University of Edinburgh; she has a PhD in contemporary Scandinavian literature. She subsequently studied Public Policy and Management at Birkbeck, University of London.

== Career ==
Prior to her election as a member of the London Assembly, Twycross worked for Diabetes UK as Head of Governance, having previously worked as the charity's Head of Campaigns and Volunteer Development. She has also worked for the Labour Party as Regional Director in Yorkshire and the Humber and the North East, and was Agent for the Sedgefield by-election, in which Phil Wilson succeeded Tony Blair after Blair's resignation from parliament.

Twycross was placed third on Labour's list for the 2012 London Assembly election and was elected as a London-wide Assembly Member in May 2012. She was re-elected as a London-wide member in 2016. She sat on the assembly's Education Panel, and the Economy Committee. Twycross was a member of the London Fire and Emergency Planning Authority (LFEPA) from 2012 until its abolition in 2018. She served as Labour Group Leader on the authority from July 2013, and as chair from 2016 until LFEPA's 2018 abolition and her appointment as Sadiq Khan's Deputy Mayor for Fire and Resilience.

In February 2019, Twycross announced that she did not intend to seek re-election to the assembly at the 2020 London Assembly election, in order to concentrate on her deputy mayor role. Following the extension of the assembly's term to 2021 due to the COVID-19 pandemic, Twycross resigned as a member and was replaced by the next member on Labour's 2016 London-wide list, former assembly member Murad Qureshi.

As well as the Labour Party, Twycross is a member of the Co-operative Party, the Fabian Society, and the Socialist Health Association.

It was announced on 14 October 2022 that as part of the 2022 Special Honours, Twycross would receive a life peerage. On 7 November 2022, she was created Baroness Twycross, of Headington in the City of Oxford.

=== As a government minister ===
On 10 May 2024, Twycross stepped down from her role as deputy mayor to spend more time on her roles in the House of Lords. She was appointed a Baroness in Waiting (government whip) on 11 July 2024 and a Parliamentary Under-Secretary of State at the Department for Culture, Media and Sport on 23 July 2024.

As Minister for Museums, Heritage and Gambling, she is responsible for:

- Museums and cultural property
- Heritage
- Gambling
- Libraries
- The National Archives

She is also responsible for the department's business in the Lords.

=== As a London Assembly member ===
Twycross led a number of campaigns while a member of the London Assembly, notably leading an investigation into the rise in food poverty in London which called for London to be a Zero Hunger City. Boris Johnson subsequently adopted the goal as part of his 2020 vision, making London one of two cities worldwide to sign up to the United Nations' Zero Hunger Challenge.

Twycross led the Labour 999SOS campaign against cuts to emergency services, from its launch in October 2012. In her role as the London Assembly Labour Group's Economy spokesperson, Twycross challenged the Mayor of London Boris Johnson over low pay and poverty in London and over the use of zero-hour contracts at City Hall.

In September 2013, Twycross co-founded the Labour Campaign for Universal Free School Meals with the GMB Union and Richard Watts, leader of Islington Council.

In November 2018, London joined the 100 Resilient Cities project and Twycross was appointed to the role of City Hall's Chief Resilience Officer by Sadiq Khan.
