= Tom Copley =

British Labour Co-op politician

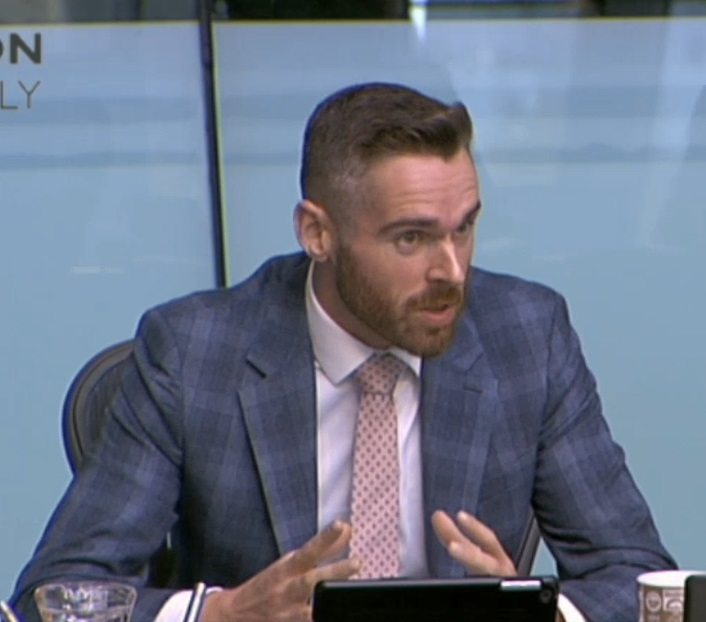
- Copley in 2018

Deputy Mayor of London for Housing and Residential Development
- Incumbent
- Assumed office 23 March 2020
- Preceded by: James Murray

Member of the London Assembly as an additional member
- In office 4 May 2012 – 22 March 2020
- Preceded by: Dee Doocey
- Succeeded by: Alison Moore

Lewisham London Borough Councillor for Sydenham
- In office 3 May 2018 – 20 March 2020
- Preceded by: Rachel Onikosi
- Succeeded by: Jack Lavery

Personal details
- Born: 11 May 1985 (age 41) Stockport, Greater Manchester, England
- Party: Labour Co-op
- Education: University of Nottingham
- Occupation: Politician
- Website: www.tomcopley.com

Tom Phillip Copley (born 11 May 1985) is a British Labour Party and Co-operative Party politician, serving as the Deputy Mayor of London for Housing and Residential Development. He served as an additional member of the London Assembly from 2012 to 2020 and is a former councillor on Lewisham Council.

== Early life ==
Copley studied at Bishop Wordsworth's School in Salisbury, before going on to study Politics at the University of Nottingham.

== Career ==
Prior to his election as a London Assembly Member, Copley worked for Searchlight, the anti-racist and anti-fascist organisation. He has also worked as the local organiser and agent for the Labour Party in Camden and on Ken Livingstone's successful campaign to be selected as Labour's candidate for the 2012 London mayoral election.

Copley was Chair of London Young Labour from 2008 to 2009 and sat as London representative on the Young Labour National Committee from 2008 to 2011. In 2010, he stood for election to Camden Council in the Haverstock ward, but was unsuccessful.

He was placed fourth on Labour's assembly list for the 2012 London Assembly election and was elected as a London-wide assembly member in May 2012 after Labour received 41.1% of the vote. He remains the youngest person ever to be elected to the London Assembly. He was re-elected as a additional member in 2016 as the second-placed candidate on Labour's additional members list.

In May 2018, Copley was elected to represent the Sydenham ward on Lewisham London Borough Council, as one of three Labour councillors.

Copley was reselected as one of Labour's candidates on its additional members list for the 2020 London Assembly election, though he was appointed to his Deputy Mayoral role and thus dropped out of the race before the order of candidates was determined.

Following his appointment as Deputy Mayor for Housing and Residential Development, Copley resigned as a member of the Assembly and was replaced by the fifth candidate on Labour's 2016 additional members list, Alison Moore. In May 2021, he resigned from his seat in Lewisham after three years, prior to serving a full term.

Copley served as Chair of the Assembly's Housing Committee, and also sat on the Transport, Confirmation Hearings, GLA Oversight and Planning committees for 2019–20. He has been strongly critical of the failed Garden Bridge project, campaigned for greater transparency on the issue, and served as Chair of the Assembly's Garden Bridge Working Group.

Following his election to the London Assembly, Copley, who is gay, was made a patron of LGBT Labour. He is on the boards of the New Diorama Theatre in Camden and the humanist charity Humanists UK, formerly the British Humanist Association.

As well as the Labour party, Copley is also a member of the Co-operative party, the Fabian Society, and both Unite the Union and the GMB. He is a republican and a member of Republic, the campaign for an elected head of state.

== Campaigns and activities ==
Copley repeatedly challenged previous Mayor of London Boris Johnson over housing issues in London. He has called for the introduction of a German model of rent regulation to be introduced to regulate rents in the private rented sector.

In January 2013 he called for an investigation into allegations of blacklisting on the Crossrail project, claiming the practice was "almost endemic" in the construction industry.

In July 2013 Copley undertook a rapporteurship into the challenges facing small theatres in London. This resulted in the Centre Stage report.

In 2016, he led a successful motion for the London Assembly to oppose the Prime Minister's plans to reinstate 100% religiously selective schools, citing evidence that this would harm London's community cohesion and discriminate against poorer families.

Copley has campaigned extensively on housing issues including homelessness, and the Right to Buy policy, on which he has produced two reports. The first of these, 'From Right to Buy to Buy to Let', highlighted the large proportion of London council homes sold under the right to buy which end up in the private rented sector and called for sweeping reforms of the scheme. The 2019 follow up report, 'Right to Buy: Wrong for London', focused on the money being spent by London Boroughs renting back their former properties and called for the scheme to be abolished entirely in London.

In May 2019, he released a report – 'Slums of the Future: Permitted Development conversions in London' on the impact of the extension of permitted development rights whereby developers are able to convert office space to homes without planning oversight. In this report, Copley highlighted the poor quality and affordability of these homes and called for an end to Permitted Development rights for any conversions to residential homes.
