= Ealing and Hillingdon (London Assembly constituency) =

- Territorial constituency for the London Assembly
- Ealing and Hillingdon shown within London
- Created: 2000
- Number of members: One
- Member: Bassam Mahfouz
- Party: Labour
- Last election: 2024
- Next election: 2028

Ealing and Hillingdon is a constituency represented in the London Assembly since its formation in 2000. It has been represented by Bassam Mahfouz of the Labour Party since 2024.

As its name suggests, the constituency consists of the combined area of the London Borough of Ealing and the London Borough of Hillingdon.

== Overlapping constituencies ==
The constituency contained all of the following UK Parliament constituencies after the 2024 General Election:

- Ealing Central and Acton (Labour), Rupa Huq
- Ealing North (Labour and Co-operative), James Murray
- Ealing Southall (Labour), Deirdre Costigan
- Hayes and Harlington (Independent), John McDonnell
- Uxbridge and South Ruislip (Labour), Danny Beales

Additionally it contains part of one other constituency:

- Ruislip, Northwood and Pinner (Conservative), David Simmonds

== Mayoral election results ==
Below are the results for the candidate which received the highest share of the popular vote in the constituency at each mayoral election.

Year	Party	Candidate
2000	Independent	Ken Livingstone
2004	Labour	Ken Livingstone
2008	Conservative	Boris Johnson
2012	Conservative	Boris Johnson
2016	Labour	Sadiq Khan
2021	Conservative	Shaun Bailey
2024	Conservative	Susan Hall

2024 London mayoral election (Ealing and Hillingdon)
Party	Candidate	Votes	%	±%
Conservative	Susan Hall	75,396	38.8	N/A
Labour	Sadiq Khan	73,257	37.7	N/A
Green	Zoë Garbett	10,508	5.41	N/A
Liberal Democrats	Rob Blackie	10,124	5.21	N/A
Reform	Howard Cox	6,983	3.6	N/A
Independent	Natalie Campbell	3,587	1.85	N/A
Animal Welfare	Femy Amin	2,809	1.45	N/A
Independent	Tarun Ghulati	2,659	1.37	N/A
SDP	Amy Gallagher	2,643	1.36	N/A
Count Binface for Mayor of London	Count Binface	1,997	1.03	N/A
Independent	Andreas Michli	1,919	0.988	N/A
Britain First	Nick Scanlon	1,761	0.907	N/A
London Real	Brian Rose	542	0.279	N/A
Turnout		195,081	43%	−4.54%
Rejected ballots		896		
Registered electors		453,892		

2021 London mayoral election (Ealing and Hillingdon)
Party	Candidate	1st round		2nd round			1st round votesTransfer votes, 2nd round
Party	Candidate	Total	Of round	Transfers	Total	Of round	1st round votesTransfer votes, 2nd round
Conservative	Shaun Bailey	79,863	39.5%				
Labour	Sadiq Khan	74,854	37.1%				
Green	Siân Berry	13,041	6.46%				
Liberal Democrats	Luisa Porritt	7,267	3.6%				
Independent	Niko Omilana	5,301	2.62%				
Reclaim	Laurence Fox	3,248	1.61%				
Rejoin EU	Richard Hewison	3,132	1.55%				
London Real	Brian Rose	2,842	1.41%				
Let London Live	Piers Corbyn	1,755	0.869%				
Count Binface for Mayor of London	Count Binface	1,691	0.837%				
Animal Welfare	Vanessa Hudson	1,494	0.74%				
Women's Equality	Mandu Reid	1,303	0.645%				
UKIP	Peter John Gammons	1,287	0.637%				
Independent	Farah London	1,240	0.614%				
Heritage	David Kurten	797	0.395%				
Renew	Kam Balayev	736	0.364%				
SDP	Steve Kelleher	691	0.342%				
Independent	Nims Obunge	569	0.282%				
Independent	Max Fosh	489	0.242%				
Burning Pink	Valerie Brown	421	0.208%				
Turnout		212,457	47.5%				
Registered electors		447,103					

2016 London mayoral election (Ealing and Hillingdon)
Party	Candidate	1st round		2nd round			1st round votesTransfer votes, 2nd round
Party	Candidate	Total	Of round	Transfers	Total	Of round	1st round votesTransfer votes, 2nd round
Labour	Sadiq Khan	81,955	41.3%				
Conservative	Zac Goldsmith	76,337	38.5%				
Green	Siân Berry	9,400	4.74%				
UKIP	Peter Whittle	7,628	3.84%				
Liberal Democrats	Caroline Pidgeon	7,381	3.72%				
Respect	George Galloway	3,174	1.6%				
Women's Equality	Sophie Walker	3,121	1.57%				
Britain First	Paul Golding	2,970	1.5%				
Independent	Prince Zylinski	2,893	1.46%				
Cannabis is Safer than Alcohol	Lee Eli Harris	1,787	0.9%				
BNP	David Furness	1,309	0.659%				
One Love	Ankit Love	560	0.282%				
Turnout		203,560	45.8%				
Registered electors		444,005					

2012 London mayoral election (Ealing and Hillingdon)
Party	Candidate	1st round		2nd round			1st round votesTransfer votes, 2nd round
Party	Candidate	Total	Of round	Transfers	Total	Of round	1st round votesTransfer votes, 2nd round
Conservative	Boris Johnson	76,300	46.9%				
Labour	Ken Livingstone	64,085	39.4%				
Green	Jenny Jones	5,578	3.43%				
Liberal Democrats	Brian Paddick	5,515	3.39%				
Independent	Siobhan Benita	5,386	3.31%				
UKIP	Lawrence Webb	3,439	2.11%				
BNP	Carlos Cortiglia	2,507	1.54%				
Turnout		166,677	38%				
Registered electors		439,143					

2008 London mayoral election (Ealing and Hillingdon)
Party	Candidate	1st round		2nd round			1st round votesTransfer votes, 2nd round
Party	Candidate	Total	Of round	Transfers	Total	Of round	1st round votesTransfer votes, 2nd round
Conservative	Boris Johnson	80,368	46.3%				
Labour	Ken Livingstone	59,920	34.5%				
Liberal Democrats	Brian Paddick	15,754	9.08%				
BNP	Richard Barnbrook	5,794	3.34%				
Green	Siân Berry	4,829	2.78%				
Christian Choice	Alan Craig	2,679	1.54%				
UKIP	Gerard Batten	1,745	1.01%				
Left List	Lindsey German	1,046	0.603%				
English Democrat	Matt O'Connor	911	0.525%				
Independent	Winston McKenzie	420	0.242%				
Turnout		176,993	44.1%				
Registered electors		401,671					

2004 London mayoral election (Ealing and Hillingdon)
Party	Candidate	1st round		2nd round			1st round votesTransfer votes, 2nd round
Party	Candidate	Total	Of round	Transfers	Total	Of round	1st round votesTransfer votes, 2nd round
Labour	Ken Livingstone	52,578	36.7%				
Conservative	Steve Norris	42,728	29.8%				
Liberal Democrats	Simon Hughes	20,009	14%				
UKIP	Frank Maloney	9,685	6.75%				
BNP	Julian Leppert	5,543	3.87%				
Respect	Lindsey German	4,170	2.91%				
Green	Darren Johnson	4,032	2.81%				
CPA	Ram Gidoomal	3,064	2.14%				
Independent	Tammy Nagalingam	807	0.563%				
Independent Working Class Action	Lorna Reid	788	0.549%				
Turnout		148,183	37.3%				
Registered electors		397,453					

2000 London mayoral election (Ealing and Hillingdon)
Party	Candidate	1st round		2nd round			1st round votesTransfer votes, 2nd round
Party	Candidate	Total	Of round	Transfers	Total	Of round	1st round votesTransfer votes, 2nd round
Independent	Ken Livingstone	48,192	37.6%				
Conservative	Steve Norris	34,948	27.2%				
Labour	Frank Dobson	19,566	15.3%				
Liberal Democrats	Susan Kramer	14,011	10.9%				
CPA	Ram Gidoomal	3,127	2.44%				
BNP	Michael Newland	2,679	2.09%				
Green	Darren Johnson	2,612	2.04%				
UKIP	Damian Hockney	1,266	0.987%				
Pro-Motorist Small Shop	Geoffrey Ben-Nathan	841	0.656%				
Independent	Ashwin Kumar	666	0.519%				
Natural Law	Geoffrey Clements	386	0.301%				
Turnout		131,268	33.7%				
Registered electors		389,978					

== Assembly members ==
Election	Member	Party
2000	Richard Barnes	Conservative
2012	Onkar Sahota	Labour
2024	Bassam Mahfouz	Labour

== Assembly election results ==
2024 London Assembly election: Ealing and Hillingdon
Party	Candidate	Constituency			List		
Party	Candidate	Votes	%	±%	Votes	%	±%
Labour	Bassam Mahfouz	72,356	37.4	▼3.4	70,281	36.3	
Conservative	Henry Higgins	67,495	34.9	▼2.0	62,038	32.0	
Green	Jess Lee	22,984	11.1	▲1.1	17,796	9.2	
Liberal Democrats	Kuldev Singh Sehra	15,293	7.9	0.0	13,382	6.9	
Reform	Anthony Goodwin	15,247	7.9	▲4.3	11,197	5.8	
Rejoin EU					5,663	2.9	
Animal Welfare					3,499	1.8	
Britain First					2,855	1.5	
CPA					2,445	1.3	
SDP					1,757	0.9	
Independent	Laurence Fox				855	0.4	
Communist					780	0.4	
Independent	Farah London				716	0.4	
Heritage					350	0.2	
Independent	Gabe Romualdo				104	0.1	
Majority		4,861	2.5	▼1.4			
Valid votes		193,375			193,718		
Invalid votes		1,383			1,257		
Turnout		194,758	42.9	▼2.9	194,975	43.0	
Labour hold		Swing					

2021 London Assembly election: Ealing and Hillingdon
Party	Candidate	Votes	%	±%
Labour	Onkar Sahota	85,216	40.8	▼2.0
Conservative	Gregory Stafford	76,974	36.9	▲2.0
Green	Marijn Van De Geer	22,620	10.8	▲3.0
Liberal Democrats	Hussain Khan	16,435	7.9	▲1.4
Reform	Anthony Goodwin	7,415	3.6	New
Majority		8,242	3.9	▼4.0
Turnout		208,660	45.8	▼0.2
Labour hold		Swing	▼2.0	

2016 London Assembly election: Ealing and Hillingdon
Party	Candidate	Votes	%	±%
Labour	Onkar Sahota	86,088	42.80	▲2.8
Conservative	Dominic Gilham	70,155	34.90	▼3.2
UKIP	Alex Nieora	15,832	7.90	▲3.8
Green	Meena Hans	15,758	7.80	▲1.2
Liberal Democrats	Francesco Fruzza	13,154	6.50	▼0.7
Majority		15,933	7.90	▲6.00
Total valid votes		200,987	98.74	▲0.37
Rejected ballots		2,573	1.26	▼0.37
Turnout		203,560	46.0	▲8.10
Labour hold		Swing	▲3.00	

2012 London Assembly election: Ealing and Hillingdon
Party	Candidate	Votes	%	±%
Labour	Onkar Sahota	65,584	40.0	▲13.4
Conservative	Richard Barnes	62,474	38.1	▼5.0
Liberal Democrats	Michael Cox	11,805	7.2	▼3.2
Green	Mike Harling	10,877	6.6	▼0.6
UKIP	Helen Knight	6,750	4.1	▲1.5
BNP	David Furness	4,284	2.6	New
National Front	Ian Edward	2,035	1.2	▼3.3
Majority		3,110	1.9	N/A
Total formal votes		163,809	98.4	
Informal votes		2,703	1.6	
Turnout		166,512	37.9	▼6.2
Labour gain from Conservative		Swing	▲9.2	

2008 London Assembly election: Ealing and Hillingdon
Party	Candidate	Votes	%	±%
Conservative	Richard Barnes	74,710	42.2	▲9.8
Labour	Ranjit Dheer	46,072	26.0	▲1.5
Liberal Democrats	Nigel Bakhai	18,004	10.2	▼6.6
Green	Sarah Edwards	12,606	7.1	▲0.4
National Front	Ian Edward	7,939	4.5	New
Christian (CPA)	Mary Boyle	5,100	2.9	▲0.7
UKIP	Lynnda Robson	4,465	2.5	▼8.0
Left List	Salvinder Dhillon	2,390	1.4	New
English Democrat	Sati Chaggar	1,853	1.1	New
Majority		28,638	16.2	▲8.3
Turnout		176,924	44.1	▲9.0
Conservative hold		Swing	▲4.2	

2004 London Assembly election: Ealing and Hillingdon
Party	Candidate	Votes	%	±%
Conservative	Richard Barnes	45,230	32.4	▼5.0
Labour	Gurcharan Singh	34,214	24.5	▼7.2
Liberal Democrats	Mike Cox	23,440	16.8	▼1.7
UKIP	David Malindine	14,698	10.5	New
Green	Sarah Edwards	9,395	6.7	▼3.1
Independent	Dalawar Chaudhry	5,285	3.8	New
Respect	Salvinder Dhillon	4,229	3.0	New
CPA	Genevieve Hibbs	3,024	2.2	New
Majority		9,016	7.9	▲2.2
Turnout		139,515	35.1	▲4.4
Conservative hold		Swing	▲1.1	

2000 London Assembly election: Ealing and Hillingdon
Party	Candidate	Votes	%	±%
Conservative	Richard Barnes	44,850	37.4	N/A
Labour	Gurcharan Singh	38,038	31.7	N/A
Liberal Democrats	Mike Cox	22,177	18.5	N/A
Green	Graham Lee	11,788	9.8	N/A
London Socialist	Nick Grant	2,977	2.5	N/A
Majority		6,812	5.7	N/A
Turnout		119,830	30.7	N/A
Conservative win (new seat)				
