= Brian Coleman =

British politician (born 1961)

Brian John Coleman FRSA

Member of the London Assembly for Barnet and Camden
- In office 4 May 2000 – 4 May 2012
- Preceded by: Constituency Created
- Succeeded by: Andrew Dismore

Personal details
- Born: 25 June 1961 (age 65)
- Party: Independent
- Other political affiliations: Conservative (until 2012)
- Occupation: Politician

Brian John Coleman FRSA (born 25 June 1961) is a former Independent Conservative politician and a former councillor in the London Borough of Barnet. He was a Conservative Party member of the London Assembly for Barnet and Camden between 2000 and 2012, and in Barnet was Mayor from 2009 to 2010. He was also chairman and leader of the London Fire and Emergency Planning Authority (LFEPA) from May 2008 to 5 May 2012.

Coleman was reprimanded in 2009 and 2011 for sending abusive emails to local residents who criticised him, breaching the council's code of conduct.

After being charged with assault in October 2012, Coleman's membership of the Conservative Party was suspended. In May 2014, Coleman stood for re-election at the local elections as an independent candidate in the Totteridge ward, but failed to be elected, gaining only 6% of the vote.

== Early life ==
Coleman was brought up as a Methodist. The son of John and Gladys Coleman, he was born on 25 June 1961 and educated at Queen Elizabeth's School, Barnet, a grammar school for boys.

Before his political career, Coleman worked in outdoor advertising for Mills & Allen and JCDecaux.

== Barnet Council ==
Coleman was elected as a councillor for the London Borough of Barnet Council's Totteridge ward in 1998.

In 2002, Coleman was appointed as the council's cabinet member for Environment. The same year, he announced his intention to seek the Conservative Party nomination to be candidate for Mayor of London, but he was eliminated at a very early stage. During the 2005 Conservative Party leadership election, Coleman publicly supported David Davis. Coleman is a former chairman of the Finchley Friends of Israel and was a member of Conservative Friends of Israel. A governor at two local Secondary Schools, he was also active in the Rotary Club and was a vocal supporter of the rights of Falun Gong practitioners and the Greek Cypriot community.

Immediately following the local government election in May 2006, Coleman successfully proposed a vote of no confidence in the Conservative leader of the borough council, Councillor Brian Salinger, triggering an election in which Salinger was replaced as Leader by Councillor Mike Freer.

Coleman was Mayor of Barnet from May 2009 to May 2010.

== Controversies ==
Coleman was a consistent opponent of redevelopment plans by Barnet Football Club, including its proposed move to Copthall Stadium. In May 2013, he said he rejoiced and called for the church bells of Barnet to be rung to celebrate the club's demotion from the Football League.

During the subsequent Copthall application by Saracens rugby club, Coleman went on record as saying that his friend Boris Johnson would never allow Saracens to build a new joint-use community stadium. Both the Council and Johnson passed the application, despite Coleman's opposition. He was also a critic of Hendon Football Club and the London 2012 Olympic Bid.

Following the 7 July 2005 bombings in London, Coleman questioned on radio how safe it was for Londoners to travel by public transport. He was against the proposal for the North and West London Light Railway. In 2009 he said "It's not feasible, it won't happen. Ideas like this are thought up by men who probably still have a train set in the attic." In June 2006 he criticised the planned refurbishment of Potter's Fields Park (between City Hall and Tower Bridge), saying that it should be replaced by a multi-storey car park

In April 2004 Coleman was against Middlesex University's plans to expand its Trent Park campus because it was "a crap university" that could "only attract foreign" students.

In April 2007, Coleman gained some publicity when he claimed that the former prime minister Edward Heath was homosexual and that it was "common knowledge" in the Conservative party that he had been told to keep it secret for the sake of his career. Writing on the website of the New Statesman on the issue of outing, he said: "The late Ted Heath managed to obtain the highest office of state after he was supposedly advised to cease his cottaging activities in the 1950s when he became a privy councillor."

It was announced in June 2008 that Coleman was to receive an honorary doctorate from Middlesex University for his "outstanding commitment to the community".

In August 2006 Coleman criticised protesters against a provision of the Serious Organised Crime and Police Act 2005 as "sad, mad and bad". On the restrictions on the right to demonstrate, he stated "It's not a matter of free speech – it's a matter of a proper way of running a world city".

In August 2007, residents of New Barnet campaigning on the environmental and transport details connected with the redevelopment of the East Barnet School site (Metropolitan Open Land adjoining the Metropolitan Green Belt), were criticised by Coleman as "idiots" and "the usual Nimby brigade". The previous month Coleman was the only objector to the erection of a wind turbine at Frith Manor Primary School (opposite Partingdale Lane), as he believed it was "out of character in the green belt".

An article by Coleman, "Politics and alcohol" for the New Statesman in August 2007 alleged that Sir Ian Blair the Metropolitan Police Commissioner was "somewhat the worse for wear at a number of official functions" and "needed assistance from his protection officers to manage the stairs". Then-Mayor Ken Livingstone reportedly responded that "The London Assembly should stop giving a platform to a person who in addition to putting out all sorts of smears and gossip is also a dyed-in-the-wool Thatcherite who in no way represents the views of most Londoners".

In late August 2008, an article by Coleman in the Barnet Press caused another minor media storm. He wrote that the British athletes were "tainted with the blood of Tibetans", and that London mayor Boris Johnson was "forced to go to Beijing to collect the Olympic flag". Coleman's comments received cross-party criticism and the Mayor distanced himself from the remarks made by his fellow Conservative.

=== First breach of council code of conduct ===
In September 2009 Coleman was found to have broken Barnet Council's code of conduct. The standards sub-committee upheld an independent report that he had failed to treat others with respect. The complaint was made by a local blogger who had received an email from Coleman calling him an "obsessive, poisonous individual".

Council leader Mike Freer granted Coleman £10,000 of taxpayers' money to pay for legal representation during the Standards Committee investigation, as Coleman had rejected the solicitors provided by the council's insurance scheme. When the local paper approached Coleman before they published this information, he told them that "This has absolutely nothing to do with me, nothing whatsoever, and if you say otherwise you will be hearing from my solicitor."

Despite finding Coleman in breach of the code, the standards sub-committee decided not impose any sanction on him. He would be liable to reimburse the council for the legal bill.

=== Second breach of council code of conduct ===
In 2011 Coleman was again investigated for an alleged breach of Barnet Council's code of conduct, this time for a series of abusive emails to four Barnet residents. The council's investigator additionally found him to have breached another code in not co-operating with the investigating officer. The Standards Sub-Committee of Barnet Council met on 5 March 2012 to consider the investigator's report and found that Coleman had indeed breached the code of conduct in respect of two of the four allegations; he was ordered he write letters of apology within 14 days. A demonstration of support for Coleman's views, claiming that the campaign against him was anti-Zionist and anti-Semitic, took place outside the hearing at the Hendon Town Hall.

Coleman appealed to the First-tier Tribunal against the ruling, but his appeal was rejected. Coleman still refused to comply with the tribunal's order that he should apologise, as the council was reportedly looking for possible sanctions. Barnet Conservative group leader Richard Cornelius was reported to be furious for Coleman's failure to apologise. Barnet Council later sought to recover legal costs arising from his unsuccessful legal defence. Coleman appeared to have apologised at last, after Conservative group leader Cornelius confirmed that he was beginning the process of suspending Coleman from the Conservative group.

=== Parking petition ===
In February 2012, an East Finchley resident accused Coleman of ignoring a petition with 290 signatures from residents in East Finchley requesting a review into 10-minute free parking arrangements in front of a post office. Coleman said the suggestion was unworkable and would reduce revenue. Martin Buhagiar, group editor of the North London Times and Independent series newspapers, opined that "Manners maketh man" and that "Coleman seems to enjoy giving taxpayers the impression he does not have any". He encouraged voters to take action at the ballot box.

=== Allowances for Councillors ===
In July 2010, Coleman participated in and defended as "sensible" a decision by Barnet's Tory Councillors to award large increases in allowances to council cabinet members. This was against a backdrop of a two-year pay freeze for public sector workers and national cabinet members taking a 5% cut in pay and was widely criticised, by Local Government Minister Grant Shapps and others. Conservative Councillor Kate Salinger abstained from voting on the increase and was subsequently removed from several forums, panels and committees she had sat on.

=== Pro-car policy ===
During his time as a councillor in the London Borough of Barnet, Coleman built up a reputation as an outspoken supporter of car driving, leading Richard Littlejohn to label him a "hero" for introducing a policy of removing road humps when the roads of Barnet are resurfaced. Coleman quotes the Metropolitan Police and the London Ambulance Service as being supporters of this policy, while road safety critics argue that the policy is reckless and driven by populism and self-promotion.

Coleman was caught by a speed camera exceeding a 30 mph speed limit in Borehamwood in January 2006. He already had nine penalty points on his driving licence. On 9 August 2006 at the St Albans Magistrates' Court, Coleman was given a further three points on his licence, banned from driving for six months and fined £300.

In August 2007 Coleman received an apology from the BBC after he had complained that the appearance of Blue Peter presenter Konnie Huq at the media launch of a London cycling event was political. Speaking at the launch, the then Mayor of London and a Green party assembly member had accused Conservatives of pursuing a pro-car policy.

In February 2009 Coleman commented on a proposed off-road light-rail line that would reconnect the two branches of the Northern Line in Barnet, as well as linking to Ealing Broadway, Wembley, Brent Cross and West Hampstead. He described the scheme as "bonkers" and insulted those in favour of it.

In May 2010 Coleman returned to Barnet's Cabinet (after his year as mayor) taking the Environment and Transport portfolio. He stated that his priority would be "roads, roads, roads and roads".

=== Partingdale Lane ===
Coleman takes great pride in his campaign to reopen Partingdale Lane, a narrow winding country road with no footway, between Mill Hill and Woodside Park in north London. The lane had been closed to through traffic by Barnet's previous Labour council for safety reasons, not least that residents of nearby Woodside Park had been using the road as a high-speed rat-run. The road was reopened in December 2002, before being closed again two months later following a High Court judgement.

Following a £250,000 safety improvement project (including a pavement, traffic islands, 20 mph flashing speed-limit signs and width restrictions) the road was reopened in September 2007. Coleman accused residents of staging one of the two car accidents reported in the weeks following the reopening of Partingdale Lane.

A third collision in Partingdale Lane in May 2008 brought further criticism of Coleman. A Lib Dem councillor commented that "Brian Coleman is like a child with a favourite toy. He just wouldn't let this go and his colleagues let him do it to make up for the fact that they'll never make him leader of the council." Coleman, cabinet member for community safety, said he was too busy to comment.

November 2008 saw a fourth crash in Partingdale Lane, when a car forced a parked vehicle into a ditch. A sixth accident requiring attendance of emergency services was reported in April 2009.

== London Assembly ==
Coleman was elected to the London Assembly at the 2000 election and soon was appointed to the London Fire and Emergency Planning Authority. In 2001 he was joint president of the London Home and Water Safety Council. By 2001, he was also the Conservative spokesperson for equalities in the Assembly. In 2002 he became deputy leader of the Assembly's Conservative Group.

He retained his seat in 2004 and again in 2008, but lost it dramatically in 2012, with a swing from a majority of 20,000 to a deficit of 20,000. He served as the first Conservative Chairman of the London Assembly in 2004/05 and again in 2006/07, and was Deputy Chair(man) in 2005/06 and for the 2007/08 session.

In 2004, as Chairman of the London Assembly, Coleman introduced the old Greater London Council Chairman's badge. He made the role considerably more civic-based than previous holders of the post, which led some critics to label Coleman as "pompous" and "self-important".

Coleman's politics and style led him to be one of Mayor of London Ken Livingstone's principal critics, publicly falling out with the Mayor over the London Borough of Barnet's resurfacing policy, congestion charging and Livingstone's comments in 2005 likening a Jewish reporter to a concentration camp guard.

On his re-election to the Assembly in May 2008, Coleman made an angry acceptance speech at the count in which he announced that "the king of bling is back".

In the 2012 London Assembly election, Coleman was defeated by the former Member of Parliament for Hendon, Andrew Dismore, who contested Coleman's Barnet and Camden seat for Labour. Coleman was defeated by Dismore, by 74,677 to 53,378 votes, a swing of some 40,000 votes. One of the largest nationwide swings to any Labour candidate in over a decade.

=== Taxi fares ===
In July 2007 he was criticised by Livingstone for spending £10,000 on taxi fares from 1 April 2006 to 30 March 2007, compared to the average figure for a London Assembly member of around £845. This period coincided with the six months that Coleman was banned from driving.

A GLA audit panel report in October 2007 showed that Coleman had run up taxi expenses of £1740 in the period 1 April 2007 to 31 August 2007. This accounted for one third of all cab expenses for the Mayor and 25 GLA members. He was criticised by Livingstone for "creating a chauffeur service for himself" and by the leader of the Barnet Council Labour group for his "breathtaking arrogance".

A further GLA audit panel report in March 2008 revealed that Coleman had run up taxi expenses of £4157 in the period 1 April 2007 to 31 December 2007. This accounted for half of all cab expenses for the Mayor and 25 GLA members. Livingstone said "Brian Coleman must explain to Londoners how he can possibly justify spending more on taxis in four weeks than the average Assembly member does in nine months."

When questioned about his cab fares by the Metro Newspaper, Coleman claimed not to use taxis but thought he was being ferried about in 'an official GLA car'. They reported that in December 2007 he ran up a £412.50 cab fare on a round-trip from his home in Finchley to a nearby meeting where the driver kept the meter running before taking him to City Hall.

Another GLA audit panel report in July 2008 revealed that Coleman had run up taxi expenses of £8231 in the period 1 April 2007 to 31 March 2008. This accounted for nearly half of all the cab expenses of the Mayor and 25 assembly members. On one day alone Coleman ran up a cab bill of £656. Assembly member Jenny Jones said that Coleman justifies the expense because he has taken to wearing gold chains from another era. The London Assembly said all the claims were within guidelines.

=== London Fire and Emergency Planning Authority ===
Coleman was vice chair of the London Fire and Emergency Planning Authority from 2004 to 2008. Following the election of Boris Johnson as mayor in May 2008, Coleman was appointed chairman. An Audit Commission report published in February 2009 noted that "The Chairman is robust and challenging but staff and some external stakeholders find his style too confrontational."

In August 2008 Coleman claimed that he had been passed over for the post of chair of the Local Government Association fire services management committee due to homophobia by fellow Tories.

Outlining areas of potential cutbacks to a London Assembly committee in September 2008, Coleman suggested that the London Fire Brigade Museum should be closed. He said that "having recently visited the fire brigade museum – we shook the cobwebs off the door as we opened it – I have to say that it is not a museum that is fit for purpose or that in my view contributes anything", adding "when you've seen one brass helmet you have seen them all". Coleman's outburst prompted a campaign to save the museum. Val Shawcross, former chair of the LFEPA, stated that "Brian Coleman has an almost hysterical approach to the issues".

=== Ted Heath cottaging claim ===
In 2007, in a blog in the New Statesman, Coleman wrote: "The late Ted Heath managed to obtain the highest office of state after he was supposedly advised to cease his cottaging activities in the 1950s when he became a privy councillor", implying that Heath used to have casual gay sex in public lavatories. The blog was written about in both the tabloid and mainstream press, but there was no confirmation of cottaging or of Heath having been warned. The claims were denied by MP Sir Peter Tapsell and Heath's friend and MP Derek Conway stated that "if there was some secret, I'm sure it would be out by now."

=== G20 Protest ===
In April 2009 Coleman blamed a protester, Nicky Fisher, attending a vigil following the Death of Ian Tomlinson, who was killed during the G20 protests, as being to blame after being backhanded twice by a police officer and then struck on the legs with a baton. "Nicky Fisher turned up to this protest, which everyone said could be violent. She put herself in this situation – and lo, she was hit. It's like going gambling and then complaining that you've lost money." The officer involved had been suspended pending an investigation into their actions.

=== Expenses ===
In July 2009 Coleman was the only London Assembly member to refuse to voluntarily publish details of their expense claims in a move towards greater transparency following the Parliamentary expenses scandal. He stated "I won't do it voluntarily. It's none of the public's business", and that "Politicians with lower expenses tend to be the politicians who do least work. Those with higher expenses are the ones who do most work." Coleman complied following pressure from Mayor Boris Johnson.

=== Comments regarding John Biggs ===
A meeting of the London Assembly's Business Management and Administration Committee on 22 October 2009 had to be suspended for ten minutes after Coleman interrupted another speaker by shouting "oh shut up you odious toad" and "you are the nastiest most odious little man who is unfortunate enough to serve in public life." The Committee chairman Jennette Arnold described the comments as "totally outrageous" and "appalling". Coleman's remarks were directed to assembly member John Biggs who stated that they were not acceptable in a public meeting. A complaint was lodged with the Assembly Standards Committee who adjudged Colman's conduct had not breached the Code.

=== Rent increases ===
In October 2011 Coleman reportedly told a single mother facing a rent rise to "live in the real world" and that Councillors simply cannot conjure housing out of thin air and to consider renting in the private sector.

=== Conviction for assault ===
Coleman was arrested for assault for an incident that took place on 20 September 2012. Helen Michael, a café owner in North Finchley who had actively opposed Coleman's policy on parking charges, saw him park his car in a loading bay opposite her café. She claimed that she was filming him on her mobile phone when he noticed her and attempted to grab the camera. A policeman intervened and Coleman then jumped into his car and attempted to drive off with both doors open, hitting a truck before speeding off. Coleman was charged with assault by beating and driving on a road without reasonable consideration.

Coleman pleaded not guilty to the charges of assault by beating and careless driving at Uxbridge Magistrates' Court on 5 November. On 3 May 2013 he pleaded guilty to the charge of assault and was fined £270 after CCTV footage of the incident was shown in court. He subsequently claimed that he entered a guilty plea as part of a deal to ensure he retained his driving licence.

On 5 June 2013 he was expelled from the Conservative Party but he remained a member of Barnet Council and announced he would seek re-election as an independent candidate in the 2014 election.

=== Further abuse allegations ===
On 10 September 2013 Coleman was described as having 'stormed out' of a Barnet Council meeting after losing an appeal against a ruling that he had broken the members' code of conduct by failing to treat others with respect. According to a report in the Edgware and Mill Hill Times on 13 September he had referred to a psychiatric nurse as "a twat" at a Cabinet meeting and had sent abusive e-mails to the chair of the local branch of Age UK.

Coleman, whilst not denying the allegations, claimed that the procedure was unlawful as the code of conduct had been superseded and that he "couldn't give a toss" about the council's decision.

== Council of Europe ==
From 2005 to 2006, Coleman was a Conservative member of the United Kingdom delegation to the Congress of the Council of Europe. In October 2005, he was sent to observe an election in Armenia.

== Later life ==
Since leaving elected office, Coleman describes himself as a commentator, broadcaster, and local government expert.

In September 2024, Coleman was re-appointed as a director of the London Mayors' Association.

In June 2026, he was re-elected, unopposed, as the Deputy Chairman Political of the Finchley and Golders Green Conservative Association.

== Personal life ==
Coleman was given an entry in the 2006 edition of Debrett's People of Today. It published his address in Essex Park, Finchley.

Coleman's mother, Gladys Coleman, acted as his mayoress when he was Mayor of Barnet. She died on 6 June 2022 aged 98.

== Honours ==
- 2004: Fellow of the Royal Society of Arts
- June 2008: honorary doctorate from Middlesex University
