= Andrew Dismore =

British politician (born 1954)

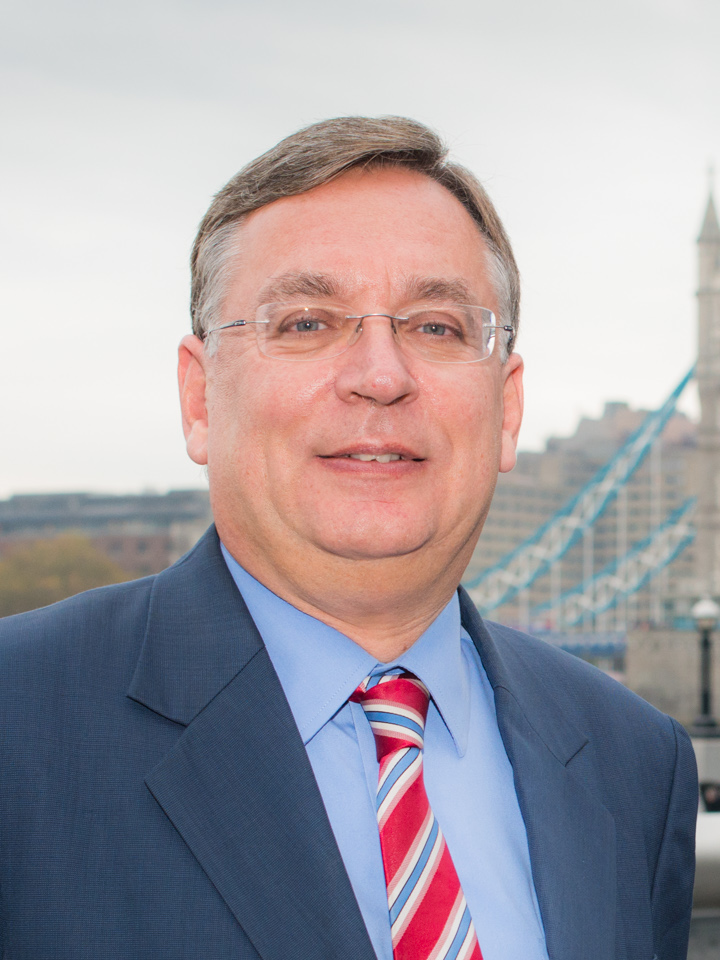
- Dismore in 2015

Member of the London Assembly for Barnet and Camden
- In office 4 May 2012 – 6 May 2021
- Preceded by: Brian Coleman
- Succeeded by: Anne Clarke

Member of Parliament for Hendon
- In office 1 May 1997 – 12 April 2010
- Preceded by: Constituency Created
- Succeeded by: Matthew Offord

Personal details
- Born: 2 September 1954 (age 71) Bridlington, East Riding of Yorkshire, England
- Party: Labour
- Education: London School of Economics

Andrew Hartley Dismore (born 2 September 1954) is a British Labour politician who was the Member of the London Assembly for Barnet and Camden from 2012 to 2021. He previously was the Member of Parliament (MP) for Hendon from 1997 until 2010.

== Early life ==
Dismore was born in Bridlington, East Riding of Yorkshire, the son of a hotelier. He was educated at Bridlington Grammar School before attending the University of Warwick, where he received a LLB in 1975, and the London School of Economics, where he was awarded his LLM in 1976. He graduated from The College of Law in 1978.

== Professional life ==
Dismore joined the Labour Party in 1974. After a brief time during his studies when he worked as an education officer with the General, Municipal, Boilermakers and Allied Trade Union, he began his professional career as a partner with Robin Thompson and Partners Solicitors in 1978. He became a partner in the firm Russell Jones & Walker Solicitors in 1995.

He was elected as a councillor for Westbourne on Westminster City Council in 1982, becoming the Labour group leader in 1990. During his time there, he led the criticism of Shirley Porter and the homes for votes scandal.

== Member of Parliament ==
He was elected to the House of Commons at the 1997 general election for the new seat of Hendon, defeating John Gorst, the sitting Conservative MP for the former constituency of Hendon North, by 6,155 votes. He made his maiden speech on 6 June 1997, in which he criticised the government of John Major for closing the Edgware General Hospital A & E department. He became a member of the Social Security select committee in 1998, and after the 2001 general election its replacement, the Work and Pensions Select Committee, on which he remained until 2005. He was a member of the Standards and Privileges Select Committee from 2001 until 2010 and the Human Rights and Liaison committees from 2005 to 2010 (chairing the Joint Committee on Human Rights).

Dismore asked Tony Blair a parliamentary question about Holocaust memorial and education, and received a written answer on 10 June 1999. This led to the establishment of Holocaust Memorial Day in the UK. He set the 21st century record for a filibuster in the House of Commons by talking for 197 minutes during the debate of the Criminal Law (Amendment) (Protection of Property) Bill.

In the 2010 general election Dismore lost his seat by 106 (0.2%) votes to Conservative candidate and former Hendon ward councillor Matthew Offord. In his losing speech Dismore complained that Offord had used his record of expenses against him.

He was a member of the All-Party Parliamentary Group for Tribal Peoples.

In 2015, Dismore stood once again as the Labour Party candidate for Hendon in the general election but failed to regain his seat, instead losing by a bigger majority as the Conservatives improved their position overall.

In 2009, The Daily Telegraph reported that he had claimed expenses equivalent to 487 journeys between Parliament and his constituency home, although the Commons only sat for 145 days.

It was reported by the BBC in March 2010, that Dismore had annual trips to Cyprus, funded by the Cypriot Parliament. Dismore failed to declare this interest on a number of Parliamentary Questions and Early Day Motions, despite providing this information on the register of members’ interests.

== London Assembly ==
Following his defeat as MP for Hendon, Andrew Dismore was selected as the Labour Party candidate for the Barnet and Camden constituency in the 2012 London Assembly election, defeating Conservative incumbent Brian Coleman. He was re-elected in 2016 with a reduced majority. Dismore served as Chair of the London Assembly's Fire, Resilience and Emergency Planning Committee. During his time on the Assembly, he has campaigned on issues including tube noise and the impact of Brexit on London. He stood down in 2021 and was succeeded by Anne Clarke.
