= Anne Clarke (politician) =

American-born British politician

Councillor Anne Clarke AM
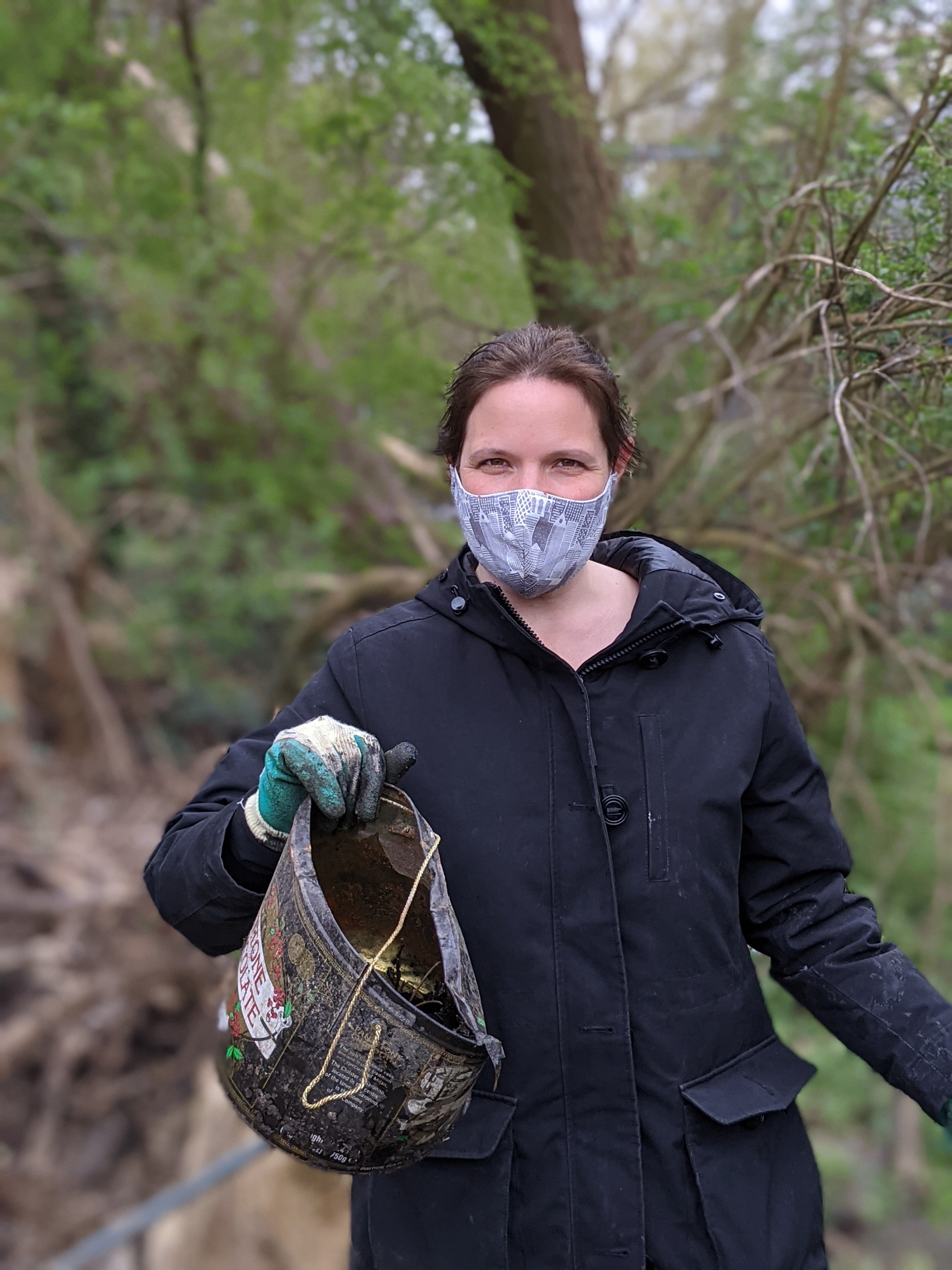
- Clarke litter-picking with residents in 2021

Member of the London Assembly for Barnet and Camden
- Incumbent
- Assumed office 8 May 2021
- Preceded by: Andrew Dismore
- Majority: 19,143 (11.8%)

Councillor for Cricklewood
- Incumbent
- Assumed office 6 May 2022 Serving with Alan Schneiderman
- Preceded by: Ward created

Councillor for Childs Hill
- In office 4 May 2018 – 6 May 2022

Personal details
- Born: Chicago, Illinois, U.S.
- Citizenship: USA; UK
- Party: Labour & Co-operative
- Children: 2
- Website: www.anneclarke.co.uk

Anne Marie Bates Clarke is an American-born British Labour Party politician who has been the London Assembly Member for Barnet and Camden since 2021. She represented Childs Hill ward on Barnet Council from 2018 to 2022, and represents Cricklewood ward since 2022.

== Early and personal life ==
Clarke is from Winnetka, Illinois, a suburb north of Chicago in the United States. Having moved to London to study in 1998, she became a naturalised British citizen in 2007. She lives in Cricklewood with her husband and two children.

== Political career ==
In 2021, Clarke was elected as the London Assembly Member for Barnet and Camden, and re-elected in 2024. She won 70,749 votes, 19,143 more than Julie Redmond, the Conservative Party Candidate, who came second.

Clarke is the Labour group spokesperson for Fire at the London Assembly, having lobbied for Londoners still living in homes with unsafe cladding and advocating for implementation of all recommendations from the Grenfell Tower Inquiry.

She has also fought for firefighters' pay and conditions to ensure the London Fire Brigade has enough staff, advocating for staff throughout the Brigade's Culture Review and "engage" process, known as being in special measures, from 2022 to 2024.

Clarke has campaigned for better regulation of lithium-ion batteries, obtaining data showing that the larger batteries used in e-bikes and e-scooters cause a fire every two days on average in London.

Clarke chaired the Assembly's Fire, Resilience and Emergency Planning Committee throughout 2022/23 and 2023/24. As of 2024 she serves as a member on the London Assembly Budget and Performance Committee, the Economy, Culture and Skills Committee, and the Fire Committee.

== Election results ==
2024 London Assembly election: Barnet and Camden
| Party | Candidate | Constituency | | | List | | |
| Party | Candidate | Votes | % | ±% | Votes | % | ±% |
|---|---|---|---|---|---|---|---|
| Labour | Anne Clarke | 70,749 | 43.6 | ▲1.3 | 62,350 | 38.3 | |
| Conservative | Julie Redmond | 51,606 | 31.8 | ▼3.2 | 49,393 | 30.4 | |
| Green | Kate Tokley | 18,405 | 11.3 | ▼1.2 | 18,157 | 11.2 | |
| Liberal Democrats | Scott Emery | 12,335 | 7.6 | ▼0.4 | 11,751 | 7.2 | |
| Reform | Raj Forhad | 7,703 | 4.7 | ▲2.4 | 7,272 | 4.5 | |
| Rejoin EU | | | | | 4,457 | 2.7 | |
| Socialist (GB) | Bill Martin | 1,639 | 1.0 | New | | | |
| Animal Welfare | | | | | 2,555 | 1.6 | |
| Britain First | | | | | 1,632 | 1.0 | |
| SDP | | | | | 1,295 | 0.8 | |
| CPA | | | | | 1,282 | 0.8 | |
| Independent | Laurence Fox | | | | 919 | 0.6 | |
| Communist | | | | | 719 | 0.4 | |
| Independent | Farah London | | | | 422 | 0.3 | |
| Heritage | | | | | 315 | 0.2 | |
| Independent | Gabe Romualdo | | | | 79 | 0.0 | |
| Majority | | 19,143 | 11.8 | ▲4.5 | | | |
| Valid votes | | 162,437 | | | 162,598 | | |
| Invalid votes | | 1,218 | | | 1,108 | | |
| Turnout | | 163,655 | 39.6 | ▼3.4 | 163,706 | 39.6 | |
| Labour hold | | Swing | | ▲2.3 | | | |

2022 Barnet London Borough Council election: Cricklewood (2 seats)
| Party | Candidate | Votes | % | ±% |
|---|---|---|---|---|
| Labour Co-op | Anne Clarke* | 1,314 | 69.7 | |
| Labour Co-op | Alan Schneiderman* | 1,109 | 58.8 | |
| Conservative | Yosef David | 415 | 22.0 | |
| Conservative | Ajantha Tennakoon | 356 | 18.9 | |
| Green | Danielle Pollastri | 192 | 10.2 | |
| Liberal Democrats | Sophie Leighton | 131 | 6.9 | |
| Liberal Democrats | Charles Lawton | 106 | 5.6 | |
| Turnout | | 1,885 | 30.6 | |
| Labour win (new seat) | | | | |
| Labour win (new seat) | | | | |

2021 London Assembly election: Barnet and Camden
| Party | Candidate | Votes | % | ±% |
|---|---|---|---|---|
| Labour | Anne Clarke | 75,180 | 42.3 | ▼2.0 |
| Conservative | Roberto Weeden-Sanz | 62,178 | 35.0 | ▼0.5 |
| Green | Kirsten De Keyser | 22,180 | 12.5 | ▲3.3 |
| Liberal Democrats | Marisha Ray | 14,172 | 8.0 | ▲1.9 |
| Reform | Mark Simpson | 4,107 | 2.3 | New |
| Majority | | 13,002 | 7.3 | ▼1.4 |
| Total formal votes | | 177,817 | 98.4 | ▼0.4 |
| Informal votes | | 2,821 | 1.6 | ▲0.4 |
| Turnout | | 180,638 | 43.0 | ▼5.0 |
| Labour hold | | Swing | ▼1.4 | |

2018 Barnet London Borough Council election: Childs Hill (3 seats)
| Party | Candidate | Votes | % | ±% |
|---|---|---|---|---|
| Conservative | Shimon Ryde | 2,262 | 39.4 | +6.6 |
| Conservative | Peter Zinkin | 2,243 | 39.0 | +6.4 |
| Labour | Anne Clarke | 2,224 | 38.7 | +7.7 |
| Conservative | Vanessa Gearson | 2,222 | 38.7 | +5.9 |
| Labour | Lisa Pate | 2,080 | 36.2 | +6.3 |
| Labour | Nigel Young | 1,877 | 32.7 | +3.4 |
| Liberal Democrats | Jack Cohen | 1,279 | 22.3 | −9.7 |
| Liberal Democrats | Susette Palmer | 1,126 | 19.6 | −6.3 |
| Liberal Democrats | Sachin Patel | 876 | 15.3 | −10.1 |
| Green | Jemma Ferguson | 406 | 7.1 | −3.5 |
| Turnout | | 5,744 | 44.7 | |
| Conservative hold | | Swing | | |
| Conservative hold | | Swing | | |
| Labour gain from Liberal Democrats | | Swing | | |
