= Onkar Sahota =

British Labour Party politician

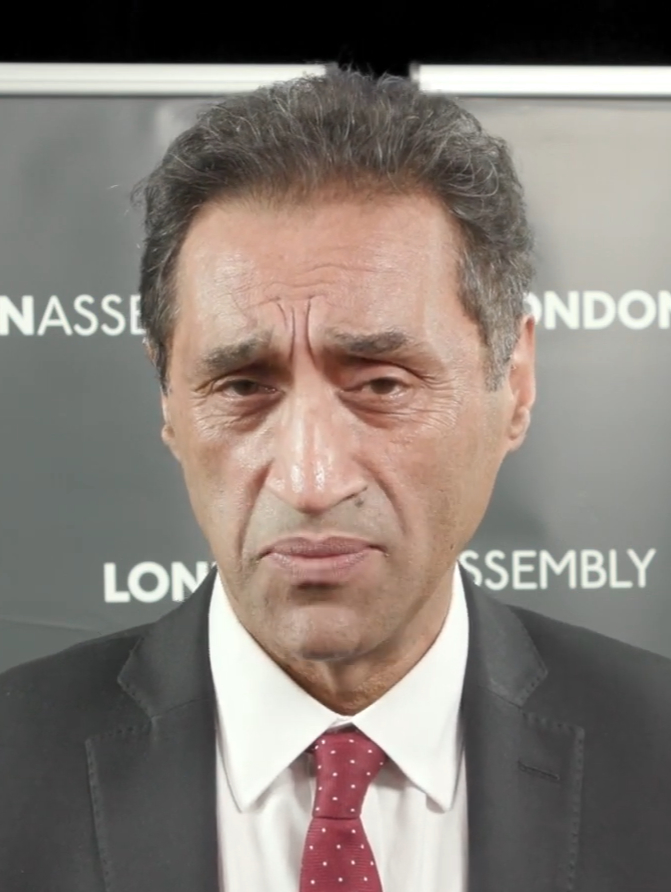
- Sahota in 2022

Deputy Chair of the London Assembly
- In office 4 May 2023 – 6 May 2024
- Preceded by: Andrew Boff
- Succeeded by: Len Duvall

Chair of the London Assembly
- In office May 2022 – 4 May 2023
- Deputy: Andrew Boff
- Preceded by: Andrew Boff
- Succeeded by: Andrew Boff

Member of the London Assembly for Ealing and Hillingdon
- In office 4 May 2012 – 6 May 2024
- Preceded by: Richard Barnes
- Succeeded by: Bassam Mahfouz
- Majority: 8,242 (4.0%)

Personal details
- Born: Punjab, India
- Party: Labour
- Education: University of Sheffield
- Profession: Doctor

Onkar Sahota is a British Labour Party politician and general practitioner who served as Chair of the London Assembly from 2022 to 2023. He was Deputy Chair of the London Assembly from 2023 to 2024, and the first Labour member of the London Assembly for Ealing and Hillingdon, from 2012 until 2024.

== Early life ==
Onkar Sahota grew up in Southall during the 1960s as one of five children, having three sisters and a brother. His parents had moved to the UK from India. His father worked for British Airways before opening his own greengrocers.

He studied medicine at the University of Sheffield, graduating in 1983, and is now a general practitioner at a surgery in Southall.

== Political career ==
In 2012, Sahota was elected the new member for Ealing & Hillingdon on a 9.2% swing, defeating incumbent Conservative member and Deputy Mayor of London Richard Barnes. Sahota was re-elected in 2016 with an increased majority. He served as the London Assembly Labour Group's lead spokesperson on health and was Chair of the Assembly's Health Committee.

Sahota was re-elected in 2021 but with his majority halved. In May 2022, Sahota was elected as Chair of the London Assembly.

== Policy ==
Sahota opposes the planned closure of the accident and emergency (A&E) ward at Ealing Hospital, and launched a petition to keep the facility open. The campaign was ultimately successful and the closure plans were scrapped. Sahota has also campaigned on issues including the Southall Waterside development and the impact of budgetary pressures on London's accident and emergency departments.
