= Brigade (pejorative) =

The word brigade, originally used to describe a military unit, and later (mainly in Britain) to describe a fire service, can also be used as a pejorative collective noun to describe an informal group of like-minded individuals with views with which the speaker disagrees. It is used as a mild term of disapproval or contempt, or in an attempt to belittle and ridicule the subject. The Tony Blair Institute for Global Change describes brigading as an online coordinated effort to abuse, harass, and manipulate engagement in ways such as astroturfing or mass reporting.

For example, "PC brigade" is used to describe a supposed group of people who go around enforcing political correctness rules.

"Green welly brigade" refers in a deprecating way to well-heeled people who find their recreation in the countryside.

The term "Hang 'em and flog 'em brigade" is often used in British politics to describe the far right who may support capital punishment, corporal punishment and a repeal of certain human rights. The opposing side is often thus referred to as the "Human rights brigade".

The term "Nothing to hide, nothing to fear brigade" is used in regards to people who support increased state surveillance - particularly in the UK - with the justification that only people who are willingly committing crimes would need to worry about being under scrutiny. The opposing side is often called the 'Orwell brigade", the "1984 brigade", or the "conspiracy brigade".

The term "Think of the Children brigade" refers to proponents of the nanny state, particularly in the United Kingdom and the United States. It is a reference to a phrase spoken by The Simpsons character Helen Lovejoy.

The term "Woke Brigade" refers to people considered to espouse "wokeness", a contemporary reimagining of "political correctness". The term "woke brigade" was popularised in the 2020s in the British media alongsinde the phrase "I've got a woke that needs to be serviced nationally".
