= Socialist Environment and Resources Association =

Independent campaign group affiliated with the United Kingdom Labour Party

- Abbreviation: SERA
- Formation: 1973; 53 years ago
- Headquarters: London, England
- Location: United Kingdom
- Co-chairs: Lisa Trickett; Ken Penton
- Affiliations: Labour Party
- Website: sera.org.uk

The Socialist Environment and Resources Association (SERA), founded in 1973, is an independent environmental association affiliated to the UK Labour Party as a socialist society. In time, it began to use the name "SERA—the Labour Environment Campaign", rather than its full name.

The organisation's policy work has covered climate change, renewable energy, nature conservation, water pollution, public transport, agriculture, waste and environmental regulation. SERA has also participated in the Labour Party's National Policy Forum process and has campaigned on environmental issues during general and local elections.

== Organisation ==
SERA campaigns to promote progressive environmental policies within the Labour Party. SERA's co-chairs are Lisa Trickett and Bill Eyres.

SERA has members and local groups across the country and has good links both within and outside the UK Labour Party with many environmental groups.

The SERA National Executive numbers 16 people, elected every three years at an annual general meeting held in November. Executive members have included Alan Whitehead, Daniel Zeichner, Alex Sobel, Sandy Martin, Leonie Cooper, and Huw Irranca-Davies.

== Parliamentary and Councillor network ==
SERA maintains a parliamentary network of Labour MPs who support its environmental campaigning and policy work. In 2026, SERA stated that its parliamentary network comprised approximately 100 MPs.

The organisation also established a Labour Councillors Environment Network intended to support Labour councillors working on environmental issues.

== Young SERA ==
Young SERA is the youth network of SERA – Labour's Environment Campaign. It was launched to bring together young people within the Labour movement interested in climate change, nature, environmental policy and social justice.

In 2026, Young SERA launched Our Earth in 2050, a national youth initiative intended to gather young people's experiences and views on climate, nature and the future of work. The first roundtable, held in London, considered green jobs and skills, including access to training, employment and the transition to a low-carbon economy.

== History ==
SERA was established in 1973 as the Socialist Environment and Resources Association. It developed as an environmental organisation within the Labour movement, seeking to connect environmental protection with socialist politics and questions of economic and social justice. Academic research on the development of environmental thought on the British Left identifies SERA as part of the wider "red-green" dialogue that developed during the 1970s and 1980s.

During the 1980s, SERA published New Ground, a journal concerned with the relationship between environmentalism and socialism. New Ground has been described in academic research as part of the literature through which the British Left engaged with ecological politics during the period. The publication ran from 1984 to 2000, while an earlier SERA publication, Sera News, ran from 1978 to 1983.

SERA hosted a lecture by the Welsh cultural theorist Raymond Williams on ecology and socialism in 1980. The lecture was subsequently published as a SERA pamphlet in 1982 and later reproduced in Williams's Resources of Hope: Culture, Democracy, Socialism. Williams subsequently gave a lecture entitled "Ecology and the Labour Movement" to SERA in Letchworth in 1984.

The development of the red-green dialogue culminated in a "Red and Green" conference in London in May 1988. Academic research identifies SERA's publications and activities as part of this wider attempt to reconcile ecological politics with socialist political thought.

SERA continued to publish policy material during the 1990s. In 1997, it published a report arguing for an end to the reprocessing of spent nuclear fuel and a transition to dry storage, presenting this as an alternative intended to reduce environmental and public-health risks and costs.

SERA's policy work was also cited in parliamentary research during the 1990s. A 1997 House of Commons Library research paper on climate change cited an article originally published in SERA's journal concerning the potential contribution of domestic energy efficiency to reducing carbon dioxide emissions.

In the 21st century, SERA continued to campaign on climate change, energy, transport, water, waste, biodiversity and environmental justice. The organisation subsequently adopted the public-facing name SERA – Labour's Environment Campaign.

== Campaigns ==
=== Water ===
SERA has campaigned on water pollution, water company regulation and public ownership of the water industry. During the 2024 United Kingdom general election, it ran the Stop the Sh*tshow campaign, which focused on sewage pollution and the management and ownership of water companies.

In 2026, SERA worked with the Labour group Mainstream to develop a contemporary motion for Labour Party Conference concerning public ownership of water.

=== Climate and energy ===
SERA has campaigned for stronger climate action and against new oil and gas development in the United Kingdom. It has publicly opposed the development of the Rosebank oil field in the North Sea and has called for a transition towards renewable energy and alternative employment opportunities in affected communities.

=== Ground Truth ===
SERA established the Ground Truth programme as a grassroots initiative focused on environmental campaigning and communicating climate and environmental policy to voters. The programme has included training and campaigning activity intended to strengthen environmental engagement within the Labour movement.
