= Elana Maryles Sztokman =

American-Israeli sociologist and writer (born 1969)

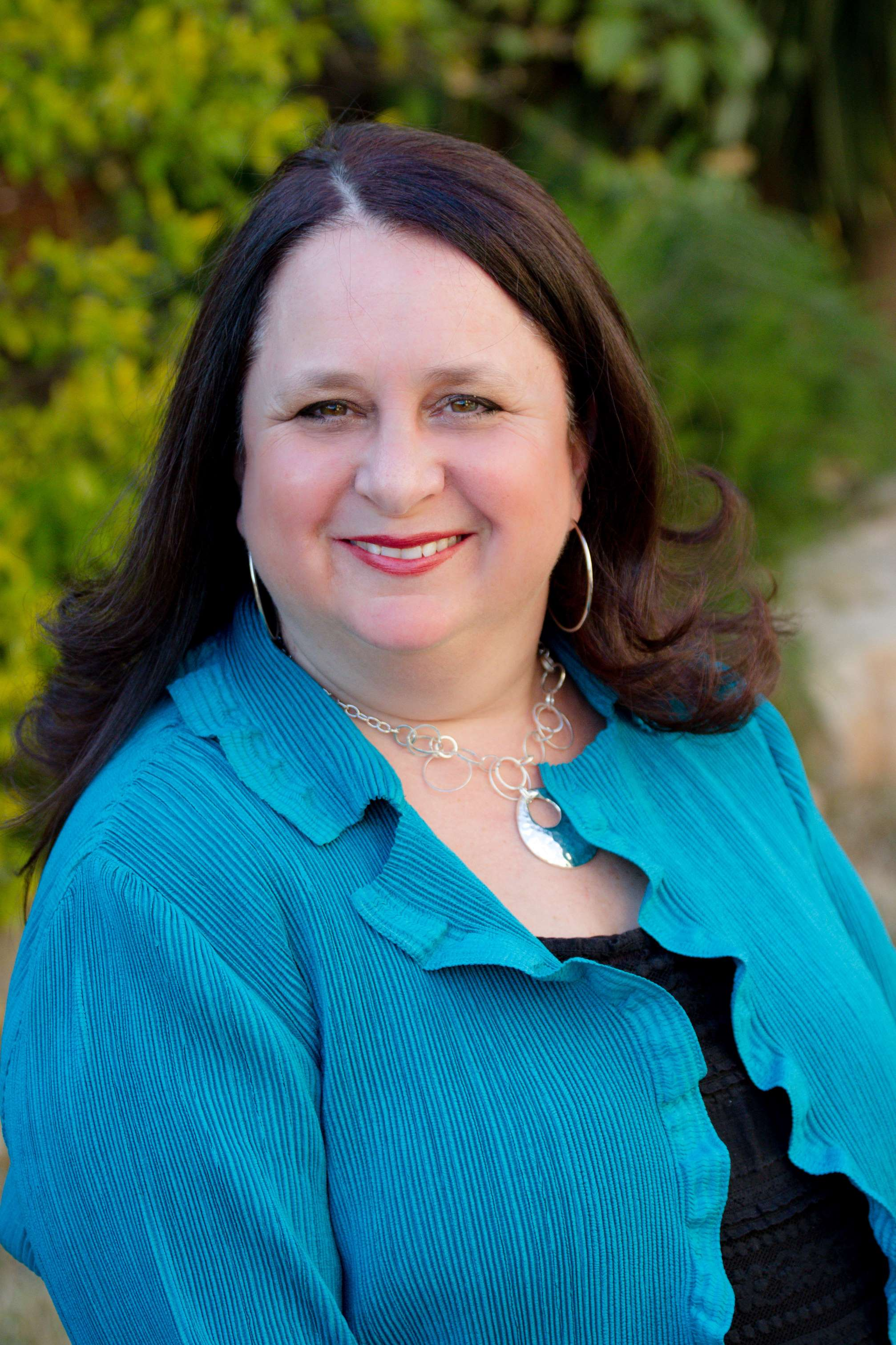
- Maryles in 2014
- Born: Elana Maryles; December 20, 1969 (age 56); Flatbush, Brooklyn
- Occupations: Sociologist; writer
- Spouse: Jacob Sztokman
- Awards: Jewish Book Council Award (2012, 2013)
- Website: jewfem.com

Elana Maryles Sztokman (born December 20, 1969) is an American sociologist, writer, and Jewish feminist activist. Her first two books, which explore the topic of gender identity in the Jewish community, were awarded the National Jewish Book Award. Her sixth book, When Rabbis Abuse, won the Best Jewish Non-Fiction Award in 2022 from Hey Alma/70 Faces Media. She ran unsuccessfully for the Knesset in the 2020 Israeli legislative election as a founding member of the Kol Hanashim Women's Party. She co-hosts the Women Ending War podcast.

== Biography ==
Sztokman was born in Flatbush, Brooklyn, the third of four daughters born to Gladys (née Schmeltz) and Matthew Maryles, an investment banker. Sztokman attended the Yeshiva of Flatbush elementary and high schools, going on to study political science and education at Barnard College. She immigrated to Israel in 1993, and received a master's degree in Jewish education and a doctorate in education, anthropology, and gender studies from the Hebrew University of Jerusalem. She also holds a master's degree in environmental science from Tel Aviv University.

She helped found Mavoi Satum, an organization dedicated to helping agunot, which she co-chaired from 1997 to 2002, and became the executive director of the Jewish Orthodox Feminist Alliance in 2012.

She received media attention in September 2014, after a Haredi man refused to sit next to her on an El Al flight from the U.S. to Israel.

As of 2017, Sztokman was studying to become a Reform rabbi at the Hebrew Union College-Jewish Institute of Religion.

From 2016 to 2021, she served as Vice Chair for Media and Policy and then Country Chair for Democrats Abroad in Israel.

Sztokman is the author of seven books on topics of gender, religion, education, sexual abuse, verbal/emotional abuse, Israel, and Judaism, including two that won the National Jewish Book Council award She has written regular columns in The Forward, The Jerusalem Post, Lilith, Everyday Feminism, and The Jewish Independent.

She writes a Substack column called The Roar and co-hosts the podcast Women Ending War.

== Bibliography ==
- The Men's Section: Orthodox Jewish Men in an Egalitarian World (University Press of New England, 2011)
- Educating in the Divine Image: Gender Issues in Orthodox Jewish Day Schools (with Chaya Rosenfeld Gorsetman) (Brandeis University Press, 2013)
- The War on Women in Israel: How Religious Radicalism is Stifling the Voice of a Nation (Sourcebooks, September 2014)
- Masala Mamas: Recipes and Stories from Indian Women Changing their Communities through Food and Love (Lioness, an imprint of Panoma Press, 2018)
- Conversations with My Body: Essays on My Life as a Jewish Woman (Lioness, 2021)
- When Rabbis Abuse: Power, Gender, and Status in the Dynamics of Sexual Abuse in Jewish Culture (Lioness, 2022)
- In my Jewish State: How I Was Trained in Pro-Israel Advocacy and Learned to Talk Back to My Culture, Find My Own Humanity, and Fight for Peace (Lioness, 2025)
