= List of feminist parties =

This is a list of political parties oriented around feminism and women's issues.

== Political parties whose main ideology is feminism ==
=== Argentina ===
- National Feminist Party (historical)
- Female Peronist Party (historical)

=== Armenia ===
- Shamiram Women's Movement

=== Australia ===
- Women for Canberra Movement
- Australian Women's Party (1943)
- Australian Women's Party (1977)
- Australian Women's Party (1995)
- What Women Want
- The Women's Party
- Australian Woman's Party

=== Austria ===
- Austrian Women's Party (historical)

=== Belarus ===
- Belarusian Women's Party "Nadzieja"

=== Belgium ===
- General Party of Women (historical)
- United Feminist Party

=== Brazil ===
- Socialism and Liberty Party

=== Bulgaria ===
- Democratic Women's Union

=== Cambodia ===
- Cambodian Women's Party

=== Canada ===
- Feminist Party of Canada

=== Chile ===
- Chilean Women's Party
- Women's Progressive Party

=== Costa Rica ===
- New Feminist League Party

=== Cuba ===
- National Feminist Party (historical)

=== Czech Republic ===
- Public for Family—Women's Party (Czechoslovakia)

=== Denmark ===
- Women's Party (Greenland)

=== Egypt ===
- National Feminist Party
- Daughter of the Nile Union

=== Finland ===
- Women's Party
- Feminist Party (Finland)

=== France ===
- United Feminist Party

=== Georgia ===
- Women's Party of Georgia

=== Germany ===
- Women's Party (West Germany)
- Feminist Party of Germany

=== Hong Kong ===
- Women Political Participation Network

=== Hungary ===
- Christian Women's Party (historical)
- Hungarian Women's Party
- Hungarian Feminist Party

=== Iceland ===
- Women's List

=== India ===
- Womanist Party of India
- United Women Front
- All India Mahila Empowerment Party

=== Iran ===
- Women's Party

=== Israel ===
- Women's International Zionist Organization (no longer electoral)
- Women's Party (historical)
- Yitzug Shaveh
- U'Bizchutan
- Pashut Ahava (2019)
- Kol Hanashim (2020)

=== Japan ===
- Japan Women's Party

=== South Korea ===
- Korean Independence Patriotic Women's Party
- Korean Housewife Party
- Chosen Women's National Party
- Women's Organization Party
- Korean Women's National Party
- Women's Party

=== Kyrgyzstan ===
- Democratic Women's Party of Kyrgyzstan

=== Lithuania ===
- Women's Party

=== Moldova ===
- Association of Women of Moldova

=== Namibia ===
- Namibia Women's Action for Equality Party

=== Netherlands ===
- Practical Politics (historical)
- Netherlands Women's Party

=== Nigeria ===
- Nigerian Women's Party

=== Norway ===
- Oslo Women's Party (historical)
- Bodø Women's Party (historical)
- Feminist Initiative (Norway)

=== Panama ===
- Feminist National Party

=== Philippines ===
- Gabriela Women's Party (GABRIELA)

=== Poland ===
- Women's Party

=== Russia ===
- All-Russian Union for Women's Equality (historical)
- Female Party (Tomsk)
- United Women's Party (St. Petersburg)
- Women's Progressive Party (historical)
- Women of Russia
- Russian Women's Party

=== Serbia ===
- Women's Party (non-electoral, Yugoslavia)
- Civic Alliance of Serbia

=== Solomon Islands ===
- Twelve Pillars to Peace and Prosperity Party

=== South Africa ===
- Nationalist Women's Party (historical)
- Women's Rights Peace Party
- South African Women's Party

=== Spain ===
- Feminist Party
- Feminist Initiative (Spain)

=== Sweden ===
- Feminist Initiative (Sweden)

=== Republic of China (Taiwan) ===
- Women's Party
- People Are The Boss (人民民主陣線) (especially focus on the right of prostitutes)

=== Turkey ===
- Women's People Party
- National Women's Party of Turkey
- Women's Party (Turkey)

=== Ukraine ===
- Ukrainian Christian Women's Party
- All-Ukrainian Party of Women's Initiative (officially deregistered by the Ukrainian Ministry of Justice in July 2003)
- Women's Party of Ukraine
- Women for the Future
- Women for the Future of Children
- Women of Ukraine
- Women's People Party United
- Solidarity of Women of Ukraine

=== United Kingdom ===
- Women's Party (historical)
- Northern Ireland Women's Coalition (Northern Ireland)
- Women's Equality Party
- Party Of Women

=== United States ===
- Equal Rights Party
- National Woman's Party (historical, did not run its own candidates)
- Feminist Party
- Women's Party for Survival

=== Uruguay ===
- Independent Democratic Feminist Party (historical)

== Political parties that advocate feminism along with other ideology ==
=== Japan ===
- Social Democratic Party

=== Norway ===
- Red Party (Norway)
- Socialist Left Party

=== Sweden ===
- Green Party
- Left Party
- Liberals
- Swedish Social Democratic Party

=== South Korea ===
- Green Party Korea
- Progressive Party

=== United States ===
- Freedom Socialist Party
- Green Party
- Peace and Freedom Party
