= 2019 Thanet District Council election =

2019 English local government election

- 2 May 2019

All 56 seats to Thanet District Council 29 seats needed for a majority
- Turnout: 30.2%
	First party	Second party	Third party
Party	Conservative	Labour	Thanet Ind.
Last election	18 seats, 31.1%	4 seats, 23.8%	0 seats, 0.4%
Seats won	25	20	7
Seat change	▲7	▲16	▲7
Popular vote	25,106	20,112	6,462
Percentage	38.1%	30.6%	9.8%
Swing	▲7.0%	▲6.8%	▲9.4%
	Fourth party	Fifth party	Sixth party
Party	Green	Independent	UKIP
Last election	0 seats, 2.5%	1 seat, 4.0%	33 seats, 36.4%
Seats won	3	1	0
Seat change	▲3	Steady	▼33
Popular vote	6,046	2,824	940
Percentage	9.2%	4.3%	1.4%
Swing	▲6.7%	▲0.3%	▼35.0%
- Winner of each seat at the 2019 Thanet District Council election.
Leader before election
Bob Brayford
Conservative
No overall control (Note: Conservative minority.)
Leader after election
Bob Brayford
Conservative
No overall control

The 2019 Thanet District Council election took place on Thursday 2 May 2019, alongside other local elections across the country and parish council elections across Thanet. The result saw the Conservative Party return to being the largest party on the council, after UKIP formed a majority then split into groups. The Labour Party also became the second largest party on the council. Labour gained the most seats in Thanet over any council area in the country.

Following the election, the Conservatives formed a minority administration. Labour took control after a vote of no confidence in October 2019, operating a minority administration with confidence-and-supply support from the Greens and Thanet Independents. Labour leader Rick Everitt resigned as leader of the council on 22 April 2021, and Conservative group leader Ash Ashbee was elected to succeed him on 3 June 2021, returning the Conservatives to minority control for the remainder of the term.

== Summary ==
=== Election result ===
2019 Thanet District Council election
Party	Candidates	Seats	Gains	Losses	Net gain/loss	Seats %	Votes %	Votes	+/−
Conservative	52	25	9	2	▲7	44.6	38.1	25,106	+7.0
Labour	44	20	16	0	▲16	35.7	30.6	20,112	+6.8
Thanet Independents	17	7	7	0	▲7	12.5	9.8	6,462	+9.4
Green	14	3	3	0	▲3	5.4	9.2	6,046	+6.7
Independent	9	1	1	1	Steady	1.8	4.3	2,824	+0.3
Liberal Democrats	15	0	0	0	Steady	0.0	5.8	3,798	+4.6
UKIP	3	0	0	33	▼33	0.0	1.4	940	–35.0
Women's Equality	1	0	0	0	Steady	0.0	0.5	317	N/A
For Britain	1	0	0	0	Steady	0.0	0.4	255	N/A

== Ward results ==
=== Beacon Road ===
Beacon Road
Party	Candidate	Votes	%	±%
Conservative	Paul Moore	368	34.6	
Labour	Aram Rawf	363	34.1	
Labour	Jane Lee-Hopkinson	353	33.2	
Conservative	Charlie Leys	323	30.4	
Thanet Ind.	John Buckley	260	24.5	
Thanet Ind.	Hazel Slater	230	21.6	
Liberal Democrats	Ian Ellard	60	5.6	
Turnout		1,063	30.6	
Conservative gain from UKIP		Swing		
Labour hold		Swing		

=== Birchington North ===
Birchington North
Party	Candidate	Votes	%	±%
Conservative	Simon Day	739	62.4	
Conservative	Keith Coleman-Cooke	666	56.3	
Green	Karen Roper	423	35.7	
Labour	Jill Britcher	247	20.9	
Turnout		1,184	36.3	
Conservative hold		Swing		
Conservative hold		Swing		

=== Birchington South ===
Birchington South
Party	Candidate	Votes	%	±%
Conservative	Linda Wright	743	47.3	
Conservative	Phil Fellows	720	45.9	
Conservative	George Kup	714	45.5	
Independent	Suzanne Brimm	616	39.2	
Liberal Democrats	Robert Wright	314	20.0	
Labour	Richard Lockwood	298	19.0	
Turnout		1,570	30.1	
Conservative gain from UKIP		Swing		
Conservative gain from UKIP		Swing		
Conservative gain from UKIP		Swing		

=== Bradstowe ===
Bradstowe
Party	Candidate	Votes	%	±%
Conservative	Jill Bayford	619	50.4	
Conservative	David Parsons	577	46.9	
Green	Mel Winter	325	26.4	
Labour	Jemima Brown	309	25.1	
Labour	Margaret Symonds	272	22.1	
Liberal Democrats	Robert Stone	204	16.6	
Turnout		1,229	38.2	
Conservative hold		Swing		
Conservative hold		Swing		

=== Central Harbour ===
Central Harbour
Party	Candidate	Votes	%	±%
Labour	Raushan Ara	909	48.0	
Labour	Peter Campbell	878	46.4	
Green	Becky Wing	765	40.4	
Labour	Thomas King	556	29.4	
Thanet Ind.	Trevor Shonk	436	23.0	
Thanet Ind.	Mandy Shonk	386	20.4	
Conservative	John Davis	346	18.3	
Conservative	Morgan Harris	322	17.0	
Conservative	James Thomas	264	13.9	
Independent	Samara Jones-Hall	109	5.8	
Turnout		1,894	32.2	
Labour gain from UKIP		Swing		
Labour hold		Swing		
Green gain from UKIP		Swing		

=== Cliffsend & Pegwell ===
Cliffsend & Pegwell
Party	Candidate	Votes	%	±%
Conservative	Brenda Rogers	648	44.8	
Conservative	David Stevens	596	41.2	
Green	Abigail Randall	319	22.1	
Independent	Grahame Birchall	278	19.2	
Labour	Christine Hudson	267	18.5	
For Britain	Michael Barnbrook	255	17.6	
Labour	Steve Ansell	227	15.7	
Turnout		1,445	36.6	
Conservative hold		Swing		
Conservative gain from UKIP		Swing		

=== Cliftonville East ===
Cliftonville East
Party	Candidate	Votes	%	±%
Conservative	Lesley Game	1,076	65.1	
Conservative	Horace Shrubb	951	57.6	
Conservative	Cedric Towning	870	52.7	
Labour	Jane Hetherington	410	24.8	
Labour	Matthew Shoul	375	22.7	
Labour	Reg McLaughlin	349	21.1	
Women's Equality	Kanndiss Riley	317	19.2	
Turnout		1,652	32.1	
Conservative hold		Swing		
Conservative gain from UKIP		Swing		
Conservative gain from UKIP		Swing		

=== Cliftonville West ===
Cliftonville West
Party	Candidate	Votes	%	±%
Labour	Alan Currie	724	46.4	
Labour	Heather Keen	672	43.0	
Labour	Harry Scobie	665	42.6	
Green	Ed Targett	442	28.3	
Thanet Ind.	Peter Cook	327	20.9	
Thanet Ind.	Steve Campbell	314	20.1	
Conservative	Mark Mulvihill	245	15.7	
Conservative	Jeremy Scarlett	241	15.4	
Liberal Democrats	Darryn Da La Soul	239	15.3	
Conservative	Avril Towning	209	13.4	
Turnout		1,562	29.1	
Labour gain from UKIP		Swing		
Labour gain from UKIP		Swing		
Labour gain from UKIP		Swing		

=== Dane Valley ===
Dane Valley
Party	Candidate	Votes	%	±%
Thanet Ind.	Gary Taylor	631	46.5	
Thanet Ind.	Linda Potts	539	39.7	
Labour	Ruth Duckworth	437	32.2	
Labour	Martin Boyd	415	30.6	
Conservative	Ian Gregory	405	29.9	
Labour	Leo Britcher	391	28.8	
Liberal Democrats	Matthew Brown	234	17.3	
Turnout		1,356	25.1	
Thanet Ind. gain from UKIP		Swing		
Thanet Ind. gain from UKIP		Swing		
Labour gain from UKIP		Swing		

=== Eastcliff ===
Eastcliff
Party	Candidate	Votes	%	±%
Labour	Stephen Albon	655	46.5	
Labour	Helen Crittenden	633	45.0	
Labour	Corinna Huxley	599	42.5	
Green	Tricia Hartley	553	39.3	
Independent	Sarah Larkins	303	21.5	
Conservative	David Kingham	275	19.5	
Conservative	Janet Kingham	272	19.3	
Conservative	Peter Parsons	254	18.0	
Turnout		1,408	26.4	
Labour gain from UKIP		Swing		
Labour gain from UKIP		Swing		
Labour gain from UKIP		Swing		

=== Garlinge ===
Garlinge
Party	Candidate	Votes	%	±%
Thanet Ind.	John Dennis	386	46.0	
Conservative	Kerry Boyd	333	39.7	
Conservative	Peter Evans	305	36.4	
Thanet Ind.	Roy Potts	289	34.4	
Labour	Barry Lewis	149	17.8	
Labour	Michael Kleszcz	134	16.0	
Turnout		839	22.5	
Thanet Ind. gain from UKIP		Swing		
Conservative hold		Swing		

=== Kingsgate ===
Kingsgate
Party	Candidate	Votes	%	±%
Conservative	Bob Bayford	413	67.4	
Labour Co-op	Richard Symonds	200	32.6	
Turnout		613	34.6	
Conservative hold		Swing		

=== Margate Central ===
Margate Central
Party	Candidate	Votes	%	±%
Labour	Helen Whitehead	482	53.3	
Labour	Rob Yates	451	49.9	
Green	Sue Rees	174	19.2	
Independent	Gary-Paul Pieman	157	17.4	
Thanet Ind.	David Wells	157	17.4	
Conservative	Robin Haddon	147	16.3	
Conservative	Barry Millen	135	14.9	
Turnout		904	24.6	
Labour hold		Swing		
Labour gain from UKIP		Swing		

=== Nethercourt ===
Nethercourt
Party	Candidate	Votes	%	±%
Labour	Elizabeth Green	509	44.1	
Labour	Anthony Ovenden	411	35.6	
Conservative	Colin Grostate	355	30.8	
Conservative	Stephen Byrne	312	27.1	
Green	Tim Spencer	249	21.6	
UKIP	Paul Weller	203	17.6	
Turnout		1,153	31.9	
Labour gain from UKIP		Swing		
Labour gain from UKIP		Swing		

=== Newington ===
Newington
Party	Candidate	Votes	%	±%
Labour	Karen Constantine	412	54.2	
Labour	Rick Everitt	365	48.0	
Green	Katie Gerrard	209	27.5	
Conservative	David Spicer	188	24.7	
Conservative	Sandra Spicer	181	23.8	
Turnout		760	20.5	
Labour gain from UKIP		Swing		
Labour gain from UKIP		Swing		

=== Northwood ===
Northwood
Party	Candidate	Votes	%	±%
Thanet Ind.	Stuart Piper	516	43.5	
Thanet Ind.	Lynda Piper	494	41.7	
Thanet Ind.	George Rusiecki	425	35.8	
Labour	Mary Dwyer-King	371	31.3	
Labour	Peter Wharmby	368	31.0	
Labour	Donald Challinger	343	28.9	
Conservative	Keith Clark	263	22.2	
Conservative	Nickie Holding	210	17.7	
Conservative	Ross Holding	208	17.5	
Liberal Democrats	Jordan Williams	98	8.3	
Turnout		1,186	23.8	
Thanet Ind. gain from UKIP		Swing		
Thanet Ind. gain from UKIP		Swing		
Thanet Ind. gain from UKIP		Swing		

=== Salmestone ===
Salmestone
Party	Candidate	Votes	%	±%
Labour	Pauline Farrance	314	31.9	
Labour	Candy Gregory	286	29.1	
Conservative	David Wallin	265	27.0	
Thanet Ind.	Luke Evans	210	21.4	
Thanet Ind.	Robin Edwards	200	20.3	
Liberal Democrats	John Finnegan	199	20.2	
Independent	Richard Baxter	184	18.7	
Liberal Democrats	Callum Gurr	124	12.6	
Turnout		983	24.8	
Labour gain from UKIP		Swing		
Labour gain from UKIP		Swing		

=== Sir Moses Montefiore ===
Sir Moses Montefiore
Party	Candidate	Votes	%	±%
Labour	Pat Moore	416	38.3	
Labour	Mark Hopkinson	406	37.4	
Conservative	John Holmes	277	25.5	
Conservative	Vic Todd	255	23.5	
Independent	Paul Messenger	206	19.0	
Independent	Gary Perkins	195	18.0	
UKIP	Terry Connor	186	17.1	
Turnout		1,086	29.5	
Labour gain from UKIP		Swing		
Labour hold		Swing		

=== St. Peter's ===
St. Peter's
Party	Candidate	Votes	%	±%
Conservative	Roy Dexter	768	46.7	
Conservative	Jason Savage	755	45.9	
Green	Mike Garner	657	40.0	
Conservative	Marc Rattigan	652	39.7	
Labour	Philip Coulson	492	29.9	
Labour	Sarah St. John	455	27.7	
Liberal Democrats	Gail Banks	322	19.6	
Turnout		1,644	30.2	
Conservative hold		Swing		
Conservative hold		Swing		
Green gain from Conservative		Swing		

=== Thanet Villages ===
Thanet Villages
Party	Candidate	Votes	%	±%
Conservative	Reece Pugh	638	37.0	
Conservative	David Hart	602	34.9	
Green	Trevor Roper	599	34.7	
Liberal Democrats	Angie Curwen	567	32.9	
UKIP	Derek Crow-Brown	551	31.9	
Conservative	Guy Wilson	460	26.7	
Liberal Democrats	Jeremy Kitt	416	24.1	
Labour	Del Goddard	223	12.9	
Turnout		1,726	30.9	
Conservative gain from Independent		Swing		
Conservative hold		Swing		
Green gain from UKIP		Swing		

=== Viking ===
Viking
Party	Candidate	Votes	%	±%
Conservative	Mave Saunders	791	38.0	
Independent	Ruth Bailey	776	37.2	
Conservative	David Saunders	770	36.9	
Conservative	Roger Binks	770	36.9	
Labour	Fiona Crawford	625	30.0	
Green	Terry MacDonald	599	28.7	
Labour	Annie Watson	534	25.6	
Liberal Democrats	Jeremy Rose	281	13.5	
Turnout		2,084	36.4	
Conservative hold		Swing		
Independent gain from Conservative		Swing		
Conservative hold		Swing		

=== Westbrook ===
Westbrook
Party	Candidate	Votes	%	±%
Conservative	Mick Tomlinson	431	44.9	
Conservative	Ash Ashbee	413	43.1	
Green	Tony Uden	262	27.3	
Liberal Democrats	Margaret Hay	245	25.5	
Labour	Clementina Onwuegbute	223	23.3	
Labour	Barry O'Brien	211	22.0	
Turnout		959	28.6	
Conservative hold		Swing		
Conservative gain from UKIP		Swing		

=== Westgate-on-Sea ===
Westgate-on-Sea
Party	Candidate	Votes	%	±%
Conservative	Matthew Scott	640	37.7	
Thanet Ind.	Bertie Braidwood	626	36.8	
Conservative	Sam Bambridge	598	35.2	
Conservative	Carol Messenger	528	31.1	
Green	Rob Edwards	470	27.7	
Labour	John Cornwall	366	21.5	
Labour	David Donaldson	362	21.3	
Liberal Democrats	Martyn Pennington	281	16.5	
Liberal Democrats	Cheri Pennington	214	12.6	
Turnout		1,699	31.0	
Conservative hold		Swing		
Thanet Ind. gain from UKIP		Swing		
Conservative hold		Swing		

== Changes between 2019 and 2023 ==
- By May 2022, Salmestone councillors Candy Gregory and Pauline Farrance, both elected for Labour in 2019, had left the party and joined a Green and Independent group.
- In August 2022, Beacon Road councillor Aram Rawf was expelled from Labour and subsequently sat as an independent.
- In early 2023, Dane Valley councillor David Wallin left the Conservative group and sat as an independent; he subsequently joined the Thanet Independents and stood for them at the 2023 election.
- Ahead of the 2023 election, Thanet Villages councillor David Hart left the Conservatives and joined the Thanet Independents.

=== By-elections ===
==== Cliffsend & Pegwell ====
Cliffsend & Pegwell by-election, 13 February 2020
Party	Candidate	Votes	%	±%
Conservative	Marc Rattigan	516	50.8	+14.1
Green	Charlotte Barton	290	28.5	+10.4
Labour	David Green	109	10.7	−4.4
Independent	Grahame Birchall	101	9.9	−5.8
Majority		226	22.2	
Turnout		1,018	25.1	
Conservative hold		Swing		

The by-election followed the resignation of Conservative councillor David Stevens, who said that he had been bullied.

==== Central Harbour ====
Central Harbour by-election, 6 May 2021
Party	Candidate	Votes	%	±%
Green	Tricia Austin	776	41.1	+0.7
Labour	David Green	631	33.4	−13.0
Conservative	John Davis	480	25.4	+7.1
Majority		145	7.7	
Turnout		1,911	31.3	
Green gain from Labour		Swing		

The by-election followed the death of Labour councillor Peter Campbell.

==== Dane Valley ====
Dane Valley by-election, 6 May 2021
Party	Candidate	Votes	%	±%
Conservative	David Wallin	491	39.4	+9.5
Labour	Martin Boyd	461	37.0	+6.4
Thanet Ind.	Mark Websper	294	23.6	−22.9
Majority		30	2.4	
Turnout		1,263	23.4	
Conservative gain from Thanet Ind.		Swing		

The by-election followed the resignation of Thanet Independents councillor Gary Taylor.

==== Newington ====
Newington by-election, 6 May 2021
Party	Candidate	Votes	%	±%
Conservative	Trevor Shonk	265	37.2	+12.5
Labour	Mary King	260	36.5	−17.7
Green	Katie Gerrard	144	20.2	−7.3
Independent	Grahame Birchall	43	6.0	N/A
Majority		5	0.7	
Turnout		724	19.3	
Conservative gain from Labour		Swing		

The by-election followed the resignation of Labour councillor Karen Constantine in February 2020. It was originally scheduled for 19 March 2020 but was postponed because of the COVID-19 pandemic.

==== Cliftonville East ====
Cliftonville East by-election, 22 July 2021
Party	Candidate	Votes	%	±%
Conservative	Charlie Leys	723	74.5	+9.4
Labour	Don Challinger	211	21.7	−3.1
Women's Equality	Kanndiss Riley	37	3.8	−15.4
Majority		512	52.8	
Turnout		976		
Conservative hold		Swing		

The by-election followed the resignation of Conservative councillor Lesley Game so that she could concentrate on her role as a Kent county councillor.

==== Thanet Villages ====
Thanet Villages by-election, 11 November 2021
Party	Candidate	Votes	%	±%
Green	Abi Smith	638	60.0	+25.3
Conservative	Guy Wilson	358	33.7	+7.0
Liberal Democrats	Jeremy de Rose	67	6.3	−26.6
Majority		280	26.3	
Turnout		1,065	18.4	
Green hold		Swing		

The by-election followed the resignation of Green councillor Trevor Roper after he moved to France and failed to update his register of interests.

==== Nethercourt ====
Nethercourt by-election, 24 March 2022
Party	Candidate	Votes	%	±%
Labour	Anne-Marie Nixey	505	55.5	+15.8
Conservative	John Davis	230	25.3	−1.7
Thanet Ind.	Claire Tilbrook	175	19.2	+19.2
Majority		275	30.2	
Turnout		910		
Labour hold		Swing		

The by-election followed the resignation of Labour councillor Liz Green on 9 February 2022.
