= 2018 Harrogate Borough Council election =

2018 local election in England

Map of the results

The 2018 Harrogate Borough Council election took place on 3 May 2018 to elect members of Harrogate Borough Council in England. This was on the same day as other local elections.

== Ward results ==
=== Bishop Monkton and Newby ===
Bishop Monkton and Newby
Party	Candidate	Votes	%	±%
Conservative	Nick Brown	866	82.2	
Labour	Matthew Forth	187	17.8	

=== Boroughbridge ===
Boroughbridge
Party	Candidate	Votes	%	±%
Conservative	Robert Windass	639	74.0	
Labour	Diane Maguire	118	13.5	
Green	Shan Oakes	107	12.4	

=== Claro ===
Claro
Party	Candidate	Votes	%	±%
Conservative	Zoe Metcalfe	786	66.4	
Liberal Democrats	Simon Oldroyd	199	16.8	
Labour	James Roberts	107	9.0	
Green	Bill Rigby	92	7.8	

=== Fountains & Ripley ===
Fountains & Ripley
Party	Candidate	Votes	%	±%
Conservative	Margaret Atkinson	875	69.4	
Liberal Democrats	Judith Hooper	246	19.5	
Green	Rachel Congdon	139	11.0	

=== Harrogate Bilton Grange ===
Harrogate Bilton Grange
Party	Candidate	Votes	%	±%
Liberal Democrats	Trevor Chapman	412	36.9	
Conservative	George Grant	399	35.8	
Labour	Peter Jordan	228	20.4	
Green	Tamsin Worrall	77	6.9	

=== Harrogate Bilton Woodfield ===
Harrogate Bilton Woodfield
Party	Candidate	Votes	%	±%
Conservative	Matt Scott	417	41.6	
Liberal Democrats	Monika Slater	266	26.5	
Labour	Nicholas Knott	233	23.2	
Green	Verity Glendenning	47	4.7	
UKIP	Harvey Alexander	40	4.0	

=== Harrogate Central ===
Harrogate Central
Party	Candidate	Votes	%	±%
Conservative	Richard Cooper	587	56.0	
Liberal Democrats	Andrew Kempston-Parkes	318	30.3	
Labour	Kevin Bolt	144	13.7	

=== Harrogate Coppice Valley ===
Harrogate Coppice Valley
Party	Candidate	Votes	%	±%
Conservative	Sue Lumby	382	38.8	
Liberal Democrats	Mark McDermid	370	37.6	
Labour	Jonny Paylor	165	16.8	
Green	Charlie Johnson	67	6.8	

=== Harrogate Duchy ===
Harrogate Duchy
Party	Candidate	Votes	%	±%
Conservative	Graham Swift	726	67.7	
Liberal Democrats	Josy Thompson	200	18.6	
Labour	Debbie Dilasser	85	7.9	
Green	Peter Turner	62	5.8	

=== Harrogate Fairfax ===
Harrogate Fairfax
Party	Candidate	Votes	%	±%
Liberal Democrats	Chris Aldred	372	37.4	
Labour	Paul Whitmore	330	33.2	
Conservative	Linkson Jack	293	29.4	

=== Harrogate Harlow ===
Harrogate Harlow
Party	Candidate	Votes	%	±%
Conservative	Jim Clark	630	58.0	
Liberal Democrats	Jeanette Marshall	266	24.5	
Labour	Elizabeth Charnley	191	17.6	

=== Harrogate High Harrogate ===
Harrogate High Harrogate
Party	Candidate	Votes	%	±%
Conservative	Tim Myatt	462	46.7	
Liberal Democrats	Andy Northey	258	26.1	
Labour	Reiner Hoffmann	216	21.8	
Green	Helen Compton	53	5.4	

=== Harrogate Hookstone ===
Harrogate Hookstone
Party	Candidate	Votes	%	±%
Liberal Democrats	Pat Marsh	576	50.8	
Conservative	Andrew Davidson	446	39.3	
Labour	Charlotte Barker	112	9.9	

=== Harrogate Kingsley ===
Harrogate Kingsley
Party	Candidate	Votes	%	±%
Conservative	Nigel Middlemass	371	38.8	
Liberal Democrats	Simon Bush	325	34.0	
Labour	Helen Burke	214	22.4	
Green	Greig Sharman	46	4.8	

=== Harrogate New Park ===
Harrogate New Park
Party	Candidate	Votes	%	±%
Liberal Democrats	Matthew Webber	326	40.6	
Conservative	Tyson Taylor	320	39.9	
Labour	Brian Summerson	156	19.5	

=== Harrogate Oatlands ===
Harrogate Oatlands
Party	Candidate	Votes	%	±%
Conservative	Alex Raubitschek	697	52.1	
Liberal Democrats	Steven Skinner	325	24.3	
Labour	Helen Evison	190	14.2	
Green	Jo Webb	125	9.3	

=== Harrogate Old Bilton ===
Harrogate Old Bilton
Party	Candidate	Votes	%	±%
Conservative	Paul Haslam	623	51.3	
Liberal Democrats	Geoff Webber	478	39.3	
Labour	David Humphries	114	9.4	

=== Harrogate Pannal ===
Harrogate Pannal
Party	Candidate	Votes	%	±%
Conservative	John Mann	768	66.8	
Liberal Democrats	Paul Brown	200	17.4	
Green	Adam Watson	104	9.0	
Labour	Pat Foxall	78	6.8	

=== Harrogate Saltergate ===
Harrogate Saltergate
Party	Candidate	Votes	%	±%
Conservative	Steven Jackson	582	59.4	
Liberal Democrats	David Johnson	218	22.3	
Labour	Ben Rothery	127	13.0	
Green	Ben Parker	52	5.3	

=== Harrogate St Georges ===
Harrogate St Georges
Party	Candidate	Votes	%	±%
Conservative	Rebecca Reeve-Burnett	763	58.7	
Liberal Democrats	Margaret McCarthy	265	20.4	
Labour	Andrew Zigmond	144	11.1	
Women's Equality	Jean Laight	128	9.8	

=== Harrogate Starbeck ===
Harrogate Starbeck
Party	Candidate	Votes	%	±%
Liberal Democrats	Philip Broadbank	403	39.9	
Conservative	Cliff Trotter	361	35.8	
Labour	Geoff Foxall	166	16.5	
Green	Gordon Schmallmo	42	4.2	
Yorkshire	John Hall	37	3.7	

=== Harrogate Stray ===
Harrogate Stray
Party	Candidate	Votes	%	±%
Conservative	John Ennis	761	50.4	
Liberal Democrats	Charlie McCarthy	494	32.7	
Labour	Christopher Watt	117	7.7	
Women's Equality	Helen Shay	94	6.2	
Yorkshire	Alexander Howell	45	3.0	

=== Harrogate Valley Gardens ===
Harrogate Valley Gardens
Party	Candidate	Votes	%	±%
Conservative	Sam Gibbs	687	54.1	
Liberal Democrats	Clare McKenzie	347	27.3	
Labour	Margaret Smith	143	11.3	
Green	Tim Ellis	92	7.2	

=== Killinghall & Hampsthwaite ===
Killinghall & Hampsthwaite
Party	Candidate	Votes	%	±%
Conservative	Michael Harrison	571	72.0	
Liberal Democrats	Allan Reynolds	103	13.0	
Labour	Sharon Calvert	66	8.3	
Green	Penny Hartley	53	6.7	

=== Knaresborough Aspin & Calcutt ===
Knaresborough Aspin & Calcutt
Party	Candidate	Votes	%	±%
Conservative	Phil Ireland	685	51.1	
Liberal Democrats	Alistair Gavins	512	38.2	
Labour	Monica Uden	144	10.7	

=== Knaresborough Castle ===
Knaresborough Castle
Party	Candidate	Votes	%	±%
Conservative	Ed Darling	615	46.9	
Liberal Democrats	David Goode	456	34.8	
Labour	Paul Burns	240	18.3	

=== Knaresborough Eastfield ===
Knaresborough Eastfield
Party	Candidate	Votes	%	±%
Liberal Democrats	Christine Willoughby	450	46.4	
Conservative	John Batt	405	41.8	
Labour	Jan Williams	115	11.9	

=== Knaresborough Scriven Park ===
Knaresborough Scriven Park
Party	Candidate	Votes	%	±%
Conservative	Samantha Mearns	457	38.4	
Liberal Democrats	Matt Walker	441	37.1	
Labour	Andrew Wright	291	24.5	

=== Marston Moor ===
Marston Moor
Party	Candidate	Votes	%	±%
Conservative	Norman Waller	910	76.8	
Liberal Democrats	Pamela Godsell	93	7.8	
Green	Gilly Charters	92	7.8	
Labour	Gary Williams	90	7.6	

=== Masham & Kirkby Malzeard ===
Masham & Kirkby Malzeard
Party	Candidate	Votes	%	±%
Conservative	Nigel Simms	723	69.4	
Liberal Democrats	Richard Coppack	180	17.3	
Labour	Sarah Whittington	139	13.3	

=== Nidd Valley ===
Nidd Valley
Party	Candidate	Votes	%	±%
Liberal Democrats	Tom Watson	604	49.3	
Conservative	Ian Roger	491	40.0	
Green	Paul Trewhitt	75	6.1	
Labour	Ashley North	56	4.6	

=== Ouseburn ===
Ouseburn
Party	Candidate	Votes	%	±%
Conservative	Ann Myatt	795	68.2	
Labour	Alan Beatham	149	12.8	
Green	Arnold Warneken	119	10.2	
Liberal Democrats	Angela Thompson	102	8.8	

=== Pateley Bridge & Nidderdale Moors ===
Pateley Bridge & Nidderdale Moors
Party	Candidate	Votes	%	±%
Conservative	Stanley Lumley	690	58.1	
Liberal Democrats	Andrew Murday	381	32.1	
Labour	David Brackley	116	9.8	

=== Ripon Minster ===
Ripon Minster
Party	Candidate	Votes	%	±%
Independent	Pauline McHardy	424	41.7	
Conservative	Mick Stanley	304	29.9	
Liberal Democrats	Sara Trewhitt	212	20.9	
Labour	Anthony Woodhead	76	7.5	

=== Ripon Moorside ===
Ripon Moorside
Party	Candidate	Votes	%	±%
Conservative	Stuart Martin	643	48.0	
Independent	Andrew Williams	476	35.5	
Liberal Democrats	Karen Mayo	123	9.2	
Labour	Laura Dinning	98	7.3	

=== Ripon Spa ===
Ripon Spa
Party	Candidate	Votes	%	±%
Conservative	Mike Chambers	592	53.9	
Liberal Democrats	Tom Cavell-Taylor	260	23.7	
Labour	Nick Murray	118	10.7	
Green	Brian McHugh	81	7.4	
UKIP	Malcolm Gatford	48	4.4	

=== Ripon Ure Bank ===
Ripon Ure Bank
Party	Candidate	Votes	%	±%
Independent	Sid Hawke	460	37.3	
Conservative	Nathan Hull	318	25.8	
Liberal Democrats	Gerry Johnson	253	20.5	
Labour	Christine Brackley	122	9.9	
Yorkshire	Jack Render	81	6.6	

=== Spofforth with Lower Wharfedale ===
Spofforth with Lower Wharfedale
Party	Candidate	Votes	%	±%
Conservative	Andy Paraskos	834	68.3	
Labour	Jules Lewis	196	16.1	
Liberal Democrats	Mavis Clemmitt	76	6.2	
Yorkshire	Alexander Hall	58	4.8	
Green	Alex Marsh	44	3.6	
Democrats and Veterans	Clive Aldred	13	1.1	

=== Washburn ===
Washburn
Party	Candidate	Votes	%	±%
Conservative	Victoria Oldham	941	72.0	
Liberal Democrats	Jonathan Hayhurst	366	28.0	

=== Wathvale ===
Wathvale
Party	Candidate	Votes	%	±%
Conservative	Bernard Bateman	836	66.5	
Liberal Democrats	David Aldous	262	20.8	
Labour	Alan Woodhead	160	12.7	

== By-Elections ==
A by-election was held in Knaresborough Scriven Park on 29 July 2021.

Knaresborough Scriven Park
Party	Candidate	Votes	%	±%
Liberal Democrats	Hannah Gostlow	635	56.6	+19.5
Conservative	Jacqueline Renton	384	34.3	−4.1
Labour	Sharon-Theresa Calvert	91	8.1	−16.4
UKIP	Harvey Alexander	11	1.0	N/A
Turnout		1,124	31.16	
Liberal Democrats gain from Conservative		Swing		
