= Equality Party (United Kingdom) =

UK political party

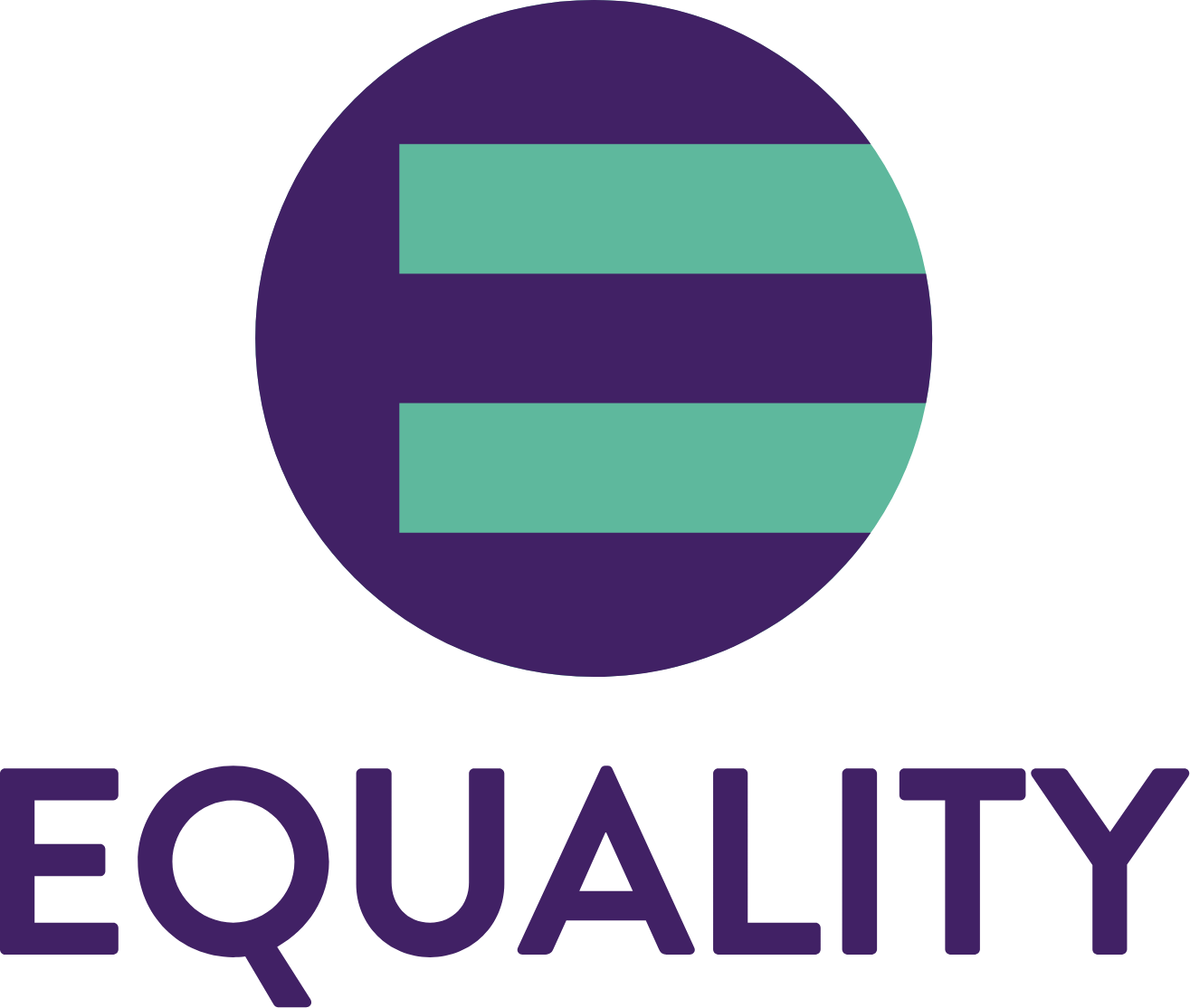
- Abbreviation: EP
- Leader: Kay Wesley
- Founded: 4 March 2025; 19 months ago
- Preceded by: Women's Equality Party
- Headquarters: Grosvernor House; 3 Chapel St; Congleton; CW12 4AB
- Colours: Purple; Green; WSPU colours

Website
- www.equalityparty.org.uk

The Equality Party (EP) is a political party in the United Kingdom that was created in 2025 by members of the former Women's Equality Party, and others. The Equality Party was registered with the Electoral Commission on 4 March 2025.

The party has two seats on Congleton Town Council, where Kay Wesley served from May 2024 to May 2025 as the party's first mayor.

The party appointed Kay Wesley as its first leader in January 2025.

== Political aims and views ==
The Equality Party's stated vision is "To create a society where equality leads to better politics, a thriving economy, equity of opportunity and a more harmonious community. We recognise this needs systemic and transformative change, looking at how society works and who it works for, and how politics operates. We plan to achieve this change by gaining awareness, support, votes, and elected representatives."

=== Violence against women and girls ===
The Equality Party has called for crimes motivated by misogyny to be classed as hate crimes and for tougher sanctions on those who abuse women in politics online.

=== Disabled people ===
The Equality Party has lobbied government to remove barriers and improve support for disabled people.

=== Position regarding gender self-identification ===
The party supports gender self-identification, and has campaigned to support trans and non-binary people.

== Elections ==
=== 2025 ===
The party stood for a by-election for Macclesfield Central Ward of Cheshire East Council on 20 November 2025. Its candidate was Kim Slater. She came fifth out of six candidates, ahead of the Liberal Democrats, with 2.5% of the vote.

=== 2026 ===
The party stood Ellie Harrison in the Croydon Borough Council Election on 7 May 2026. Harrison's stated objective was to "speak up for those who have no voice, or who are consistently unheard and ignored."

Harrison received 2.3% of the vote and was not elected.

Dr Abby Smith stood for the party in a Congleton Town Council by-election on 21st May 2026.

Smith received 6.1% of the vote and was not elected.

=== General elections ===
The party declared a Party List of candidates for the 2026 Scottish Parliament election, in the Edinburgh and Lothians East Region. The candidates were David Renton, Laura Mackintosh and Caitlin Walton.

The party got 0.1% of the vote and so got no MSP's elected.

=== Scottish Parliament elections ===
Date	Regional Vote	% of Vote	Change	MSPs	Change
2026		0.1%	n/a	0	Steady
