= Catherine Mayer =

British journalist and political activist (1961)

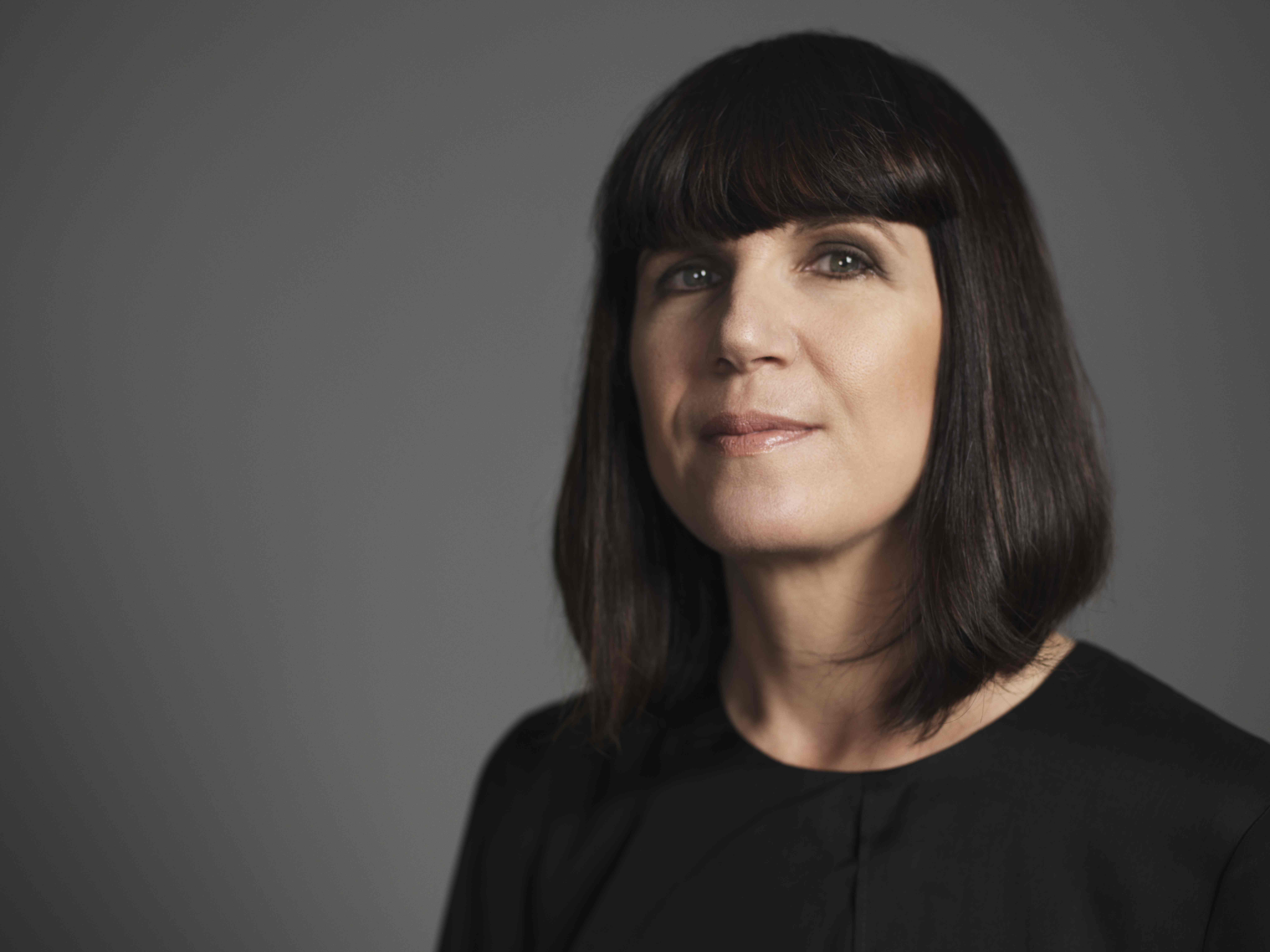
- Born: 24 January 1961 (age 65); United States
- Education: University of Sussex
- Occupations: Author, journalist, politician
- Known for: Co-founder of Women's Equality Party
- Notable work: Charles: The Heart of a King
- Political party: Women's Equality Party
- Spouse: Andy Gill (m. 1999; died 2020)
- Father: David Mayer
- Relatives: Lise Mayer (sister)
- Website: www.catherinemayer.co.uk

Catherine Mayer (born 24 January 1961) is an American-born British author and journalist, and the co-founder and President of the former Women's Equality Party (WE) in the UK.

== Early life ==
Mayer was born in the US to a Jewish family and later became naturalised as British. She moved to Britain as a child when her father, the theatre historian David Mayer, came to research a book and later secured employment at Manchester University, where his students included Ben Elton and Rik Mayall. Her mother, Anne Mayer Bird, was prominent within theatre PR.

Mayer attended Manchester High School for Girls, and studied English Literature and European Studies at the University of Sussex (1978–82). One of her sisters is The Young Ones co-writer (with Mayall) Lise Mayer, while another is the theatre agent-turned-equestrian Cassie Mayer.

== Career ==
Mayer started her career at The Economist and has worked as a foreign correspondent at the German news weekly Focus.

External videos
- Catherine Mayer talks about her book
- Amortality: The Pleasures and Perils of Living Agelessly via Ebury Press on YouTube

Mayer was president of the Foreign Press Association in London from June 2003 until June 2005. She worked at Time magazine from 2004 to April 2015, serving as Time's Editor at Large, Europe Editor, London Bureau Chief and Senior Editor. Mayer began legal action against Time in July 2017 on the grounds of age and gender discrimination. Her attorney was Dr. Ann Olivarius, a founding member of the Women's Equality Party, which was co-founded by Mayer (see below); Mayer and Olivarius were featured in a 2018 episode of Thomson Reuters Legal UK & Ireland's podcast series, "The Hearing." Mayer's lawsuit prompted other journalists to seek legal advice about sexual discrimination and ended with an "amicable resolution" in 2018.

In 2011, Mayer wrote Amortality: The Pleasures and Perils of Living Agelessly about the pros and cons of people living longer. Her 2015 biography of Prince Charles, published in the UK as Charles: The Heart of a King and in the US as Born to Be King, generated worldwide headlines with its claims of dysfunction in the royal courts. Clarence House, which had facilitated access to the Prince, distanced itself from the book. Mayer stood by the content. The book was a Sunday Times Top Ten bestseller.

Mayer's non-fiction Attack of the 50ft. Women was published in 2017. The book covers the benefits of gender equality and how it is being promoted in various countries, and has been described as "a compelling feminist call to arms".

Her memoir Good Grief, which incorporates letters written by her mother and covers the death of both women's husbands and the Covid-19 pandemic, was published by HarperCollins in December 2020, with an updated paperback edition in February 2022. Reviewing Good Grief in The Observer, Kate Kellaway called it "smart, upbeat and brimming with fortitude", and those who also gave endorsements and praise included Kate Mosse, who described it as "a perfect book, specific and personal, but spot on about the universal nature of grief and how we grieve. Every page sings."

Mayer's debut novel TIME/LIFE, published by Renard Press in 2025, reimagined H.G. Wells' The Time Machine for the age of AI, replacing the original time traveller with the world's most powerful tech bro, and has been described by William Gibson as "multiplexly brilliant, intricately fascinating, harrowingly emotional fiction, sprung from this century’s first and possibly final quarter."

Miranda Seymour, reviewing Mayer's 2026 book, Divide and Rule: Royal Women and Their Battles, for the Financial Times, described this feminist history of royal women from Anne Boleyn to the present day as "effortlessly readable".

Mayer has won awards for her writing and been named in a number of "most influential" lists.

== Women's Equality Party ==
Mayer co-founded the Women's Equality Party with Sandi Toksvig in March 2015 and was its president throughout the decade of its existence. The party had core objectives: equal representation, equal pay, equality in and through the media, equal education, equal health, shared opportunities in parenting and caregiving and an end to violence against women; its first policy commitments were launched by the party's first leader, Sophie Walker, at Conway Hall on 20 October 2015.

In February 2018 Mayer stated: "The party also welcomed all genders. Everyone is born with a sex, usually, though not always, male or female. Gender is the product of social and cultural factors that can be changed. The very first policy document made clear that WE supported "the right of all to define their sex or gender or to reject gendered divisions as they choose." The party won its first seat in the local elections in May 2019. Mayer stood as the lead candidate for the party in the 2019 European Elections in London. The party was dissolved in November 2024.

== Primadonna Festival ==
Mayer co-founded the Primadonna Festival in 2019, a festival of ideas, writing, music and comedy at Laffitt's Hall in Pettaugh, Suffolk, aiming to give prominence to women and to new voices. The festival awards the Primadonna Prize "for unsigned and unrepresented new writing talent". In 2026, Primadonna announced as new publishing imprint, Primadonna Publishing, co-founded with Renard Press.

== Personal life ==
Mayer was married to the musician Andy Gill of Gang of Four, from 1999 until his death in February 2020. She is of Jewish heritage (her maternal grandmother was not Jewish).

== Bibliography ==
Books

- Amortality: the pleasures and perils of living agelessly. London: Vermilion. 2011. ISBN 9780091939366.
- Charles: The Heart of a King. London: WH Allen/Penguin Random House. 2015. ISBN 9780753555934.
  - Born to be King: Prince Charles on Planet Windsor. New York: Henry Holt and Company. 2015. ISBN 9781627794381.
- Attack of the 50 Ft. Women: How Gender Equality Can Save The World. London: HarperCollins/HQ. 2017. ISBN 978 0008219802.
- Good Grief. London: HarperCollins/HQ. 2020. ISBN 9780008436100.
- TIME/LIFE. Renard Press (print and ebook); HarperCollins (audiobook). ISBN 9781804471418
- Divide and Rule: Royal Women and Their Battles. London: HarperCollins/HQ. 2026. ISBN 9780008730178.

Selected articles

- "Amortality: Why acting your age is a thing of the past". Time. Time Inc. 25 April 2011. Archived from the original on 18 April 2011.
- "Live long. Stay healthy. Join the immortals". The Observer. Guardian Media Group. 1 May 2011.
- "Why I’m suing a global corporation for discrimination – and why I refuse to back down", The Pool, 30 August 2017.
- "It's not a 'witch hunt,' it's sexual harassment and we should call it out," CNN, 2 November 2017.

Video

- Catherine Mayer (5 December 2017). We should all be hags (Video). TEDx Covent Garden Women via YouTube.
- Maxine Mawhinney (host) and Catherine Mayer (guest) (14 June 2018). The Moment: Catherine Mayer (Video). The Moment via YouTube.
