= 2019 Basingstoke and Deane Borough Council election =

UK local election

← 2018	2 May 2019	2021 →

21 of the 60 seats to Basingstoke and Deane Borough Council 31 seats needed for a majority
	First party	Second party	Third party
Leader	Ken Rhatigan	Paul Harvey	Gavin James
Party	Conservative	Labour	Liberal Democrats
Leader's seat	Kingsclere	Norden	Eastrop
Seats won	12	2	2
Council control before election
Conservative
Council control after election
Conservative

Elections to Basingstoke and Deane Borough Council took place on Thursday, 2 May 2019, alongside other local elections across the country. Elections took place in 20 of the 60 seats.

== Results summary ==
The Conservative Party lost two seats to the Liberal Democrats, whilst Labour held their incumbent seats. Whilst Labour remained the second largest party (and largest opposition party), the Liberal Democrats won more votes for the first time.

The table below only tallies the votes of the highest polling candidate for each party within each ward. This is known as the top candidate method and is often used for multi-member plurality elections.

Basingstoke and Deane Borough Council election 2019
Party	This election			Full council			This election		
Party	Seats	Net	Seats %	Other	Total	Total %	Votes	Votes %	+/−
Conservative	12	▼3	60.0	19	33	55	14,838	47.75	
Liberal Democrats	4	▲2	20.0	3	7	11.66	8,044	25.80	
Labour	4	▲1	20.0	17	21	35	6,447	20.68	
Independent	0	Steady	0.0	1	1	1.66	1,117	3.58	
Green	0	Steady	0.0	0	0	0	616	1.97	
Women's Equality	0	Steady	0.0	0	0	0	63	0.20	

== Ward results ==
=== Basing ===
Basing
Party	Candidate	Votes	%	±%
Conservative	Paul Gaskell	1,179	50.4	
Independent	Mark Oszczyk	484	20.7	
Liberal Democrats	Richard Lilleker	284	12.1	
Labour	Leslie Clarke	203	8.7	
Independent	Alan Stone	191	8.2	
Majority		695		
Conservative hold		Swing		

=== Baughurst and Tadley North ===
Baughurst and Tadley North
Party	Candidate	Votes	%	±%
Liberal Democrats	Warwick Lovegrove	719	48.7	
Conservative	Jonathan Richards	616	41.8	
Labour	George Porter	140	9.5	
Majority		103		
Liberal Democrats gain from Conservative		Swing		

=== Bramley and Sherfield ===
Bramley and Sherfield
Party	Candidate	Votes	%	±%
Conservative	Nick Robinson	929	56.2	
Green	Iain James	408	24.7	
Liberal Democrats	Janice Spalding	201	12.2	
Labour	Stephen Rothman	114	6.9	
Majority		521		
Conservative hold		Swing		

=== Brighton Hill North ===
Brighton Hill North
Party	Candidate	Votes	%	±%
Liberal Democrats	Andy Konieczko	621	47.7	
Labour	Julie Pierce	336	25.8	
Conservative	Jordan Barry	248	19.0	
Independent	Stan Tennison	98	7.5	
Majority		285		
Liberal Democrats gain from Conservative		Swing		

=== Burghclere, Highclere and St Mary Bourne ===
Burghclere, Highclere and St Mary Bourne
Party	Candidate	Votes	%	±%
Conservative	John Richard Izett	1,092	67.4	
Liberal Democrats	Pauleen Malone	391	24.1	
Labour	Thomas Stephen Phippen	138	8.5	
Majority		701		
Conservative hold		Swing		

=== Chineham ===
Chineham
Party	Candidate	Votes	%	±%
Conservative	Laura Edwards	1,374	66.6	
Liberal Democrats	Pauleen Malone	434	21.0	
Labour	Grant Donohoe	256	12.4	
Majority		940		
Conservative hold		Swing		

=== Eastrop ===
Eastrop
Party	Candidate	Votes	%	±%
Liberal Democrats	Ryan James Hickling	695	50.2	
Conservative	Arun Mummalaneni	328	23.7	
Labour	Sajish Tom	194	14.0	
Independent	Duncan Philip Stone	104	7.5	
Women's Equality	Priya Ishwari Brown	63	4.6	
Majority		367		
Liberal Democrats hold		Swing		

=== Grove ===
Grove
Party	Candidate	Votes	%	±%
Liberal Democrats	Ronald John Hussey	1,173	70.1	
Conservative	Nicholas John Bates	343	20.5	
Labour	Andrew Douglas Mountford	157	9.4	
Majority		830		
Liberal Democrats hold		Swing		

=== Hatch Warren and Beggarwood ===
Hatch Warren and Beggarwood
Party	Candidate	Votes	%	±%
Conservative	Rebecca Louise Bean	994	53.5	
Independent	Spencer Cleary	244	13.1	
Green	Stephen Murray Philipotts	208	11.2	
Labour	Kamal Gurung	206	11.1	
Liberal Democrats	Madeline Hussey	206	11.1	
Majority		700		
Conservative hold		Swing		

=== Kempshott ===
Kempshott
Party	Candidate	Votes	%	±%
Conservative	Tony Capon	1,095	60.8	
Liberal Democrats	Stav O'Doherty	450	25.0	
Labour	Tom Cusack	255	14.2	
Majority		645		
Conservative hold		Swing		

=== Kingsclere ===
Kingsclere
Party	Candidate	Votes	%	±%
Conservative	Clare Nicola Kinnear	813	55.7	
Liberal Democrats	Monica Dorothea Lubbock-Smith	331	22.7	
Independent	Ray Peach	315	21.6	
Majority		482		
Conservative hold		Swing		

=== Norden ===
Norden
Party	Candidate	Votes	%	±%
Labour	Carolyn Moorhouse Wooldridge	1,038	64.1	
Conservative	Michael Robert Archer	394	24.3	
Liberal Democrats	James David Belchamber	187	11.6	
Majority		644		
Labour hold		Swing		

=== Oakley and North Waltham ===
Oakley and North Waltham
Party	Candidate	Votes	%	±%
Conservative	Hannah Elizabeth Goldin	1,246	61.2	
Liberal Democrats	Robert Charles Cooper	559	27.5	
Labour	Helen Allice Jeffrey	231	11.3	
Majority		687		
Conservative hold		Swing		

=== Overton, Laverstoke & Steventon ===
Overton, Laverstoke & Steventon
Party	Candidate	Votes	%	±%
Labour	Colin John William Phillimore	799	46.8	
Conservative	Sam Carr	395	23.1	
Liberal Democrats	Lucy Sloane Williams	348	20.4	
Independent	Graham John Gould	165	9.7	
Majority		404		
Labour hold		Swing		

=== Pamber and Silchester ===
Pamber and Silchester
Party	Candidate	Votes	%	±%
Conservative	Simon Heelum Mahaffey	1,006	69.7	
Liberal Democrats	Martin John Baker	271	18.8	
Labour	Lydia Massey	166	11.5	
Majority		735		
Conservative hold		Swing		

=== South Ham ===
South Ham
Party	Candidate	Votes	%	±%
Labour	Gary John Watts	1,002	56.8	
Conservative	Marcus Guy Simpson	540	30.6	
Liberal Democrats	Stephen David Whitechurch	222	12.6	
Majority		462		
Labour hold		Swing		

=== Tadley Central ===
Tadley Central
Party	Candidate	Votes	%	±%
Conservative	Jenny Vaux	329	47.1	
Liberal Democrats	Jo Slimin	286	40.9	
Labour	Matthew Russell	84	12.0	
Majority		43		
Conservative hold		Swing		

=== Tadley South ===
Tadley South
Party	Candidate	Votes	%	±%
Conservative	Kerri Elizabeth Carruthers	691	58.4	
Liberal Democrats	Rene Cornelis Leliveld	492	41.6	
Majority		199		
Conservative hold		Swing		

=== Upton Grey and the Candovers ===
Upton Grey and the Candovers
Party	Candidate	Votes	%	±%
Conservative	Mark Beresford Ruffell	685	73.4	
Liberal Democrats	Jeff Teagle	174	18.6	
Labour	Mary Margaret Brian	74	7.9	
Majority		511		
Conservative hold		Swing		

=== Winklebury ===
Winklebury
Party	Candidate	Votes	%	±%
Labour	Angie Freeman	1,054	64.1	
Conservative	Mike Patchett	591	35.9	
Majority		463		
Labour hold		Swing		
