= 2019 Milton Keynes Council election =

2019 UK local government election

- 2 May 2019

19 of 57 seats (One third) to Milton Keynes Council 29 seats needed for a majority
- Turnout: 30.13% (▼2.97%)
	First party	Second party	Third party
Leader	Peter Marland	Alex Walker	Douglas McCall
Party	Labour	Conservative	Liberal Democrats
Leader's seat	Wolverton	Stantonbury	Newport Pagnell South
Last election	8 seats, 37.3%	6 seats, 39.1%	6 seats, 17.8%
Seats before	21	24	12
Seats won	6	8	5
Seats after	23	19	15
Seat change	▲2	▼5	▲3
Popular vote	17,658	20,536	12,484
Percentage	30.06%	34.97%	21.26%
Swing	▼7.24%	▼4.13%	▲3.46%
	Fourth party	Fifth party	Sixth party
Leader	Unknown	Andrew Cole	Darron Kendrick
Party	Green	UKIP	Independent
Leader's seat	Unknown (Unelected)	Newport Pagnell North & Hanslope (Unelected)	Central Milton Keynes (Unelected)
Last election	0 seats, 4.89%	0 seats, 0.59%	0 seats, 0.1%
Seats before	0	0	0
Seats won	0	0	0
Seats after	0	0	0
Seat change	0	0	0
Popular vote	5,752	1,818	334
Percentage	9.79%	3.1%	0.57%
Swing	▲4.9%	▲2.51%	▲0.47%
	Seventh party
Leader	Jane Whild
Party	Women's Equality
Leader's seat	Campbell Park & Old Whoughton (Unelected)
Last election	Did not contest
Seats before	0
Seats won	0
Seats after	0
Seat change	0
Popular vote	151
Percentage	0.26%
Swing	▲0.26%
- Map showing the results of the 2019 Milton Keynes Council election
Leader of the Council before election
Peter Marland (Labour)
No Overall Control
Leader of the Council after election
Peter Marland (Labour)
No Overall Control

The 2019 Milton Keynes Council election took place on 2 May 2019 to elect members of Milton Keynes Council in England. This election was held on the same day as other local elections.

== Election results ==
2019 Milton Keynes Council election
Party	This election				Full council			This election		
Party	Candidates	Seats	Net	Seats %	Other	Total	Total %	Votes	Votes %	+/−
Labour	{{{candidates}}}	6	▲2	31.6	17	23	40.4	17,658	30.1	
Conservative	{{{candidates}}}	8	▼5	42.1	11	19	33.3	20,536	35.0	
Liberal Democrats	{{{candidates}}}	5	▲3	26.3	10	15	26.3	12,484	21.3	
Green	{{{candidates}}}	0	Steady	0.0	0	0	0.0	5,752	9.8	
UKIP	{{{candidates}}}	0	Steady	0.0	0	0	0.0	1,818	3.1	
Independent	{{{candidates}}}	0	Steady	0.0	0	0	0.0	334	0.6	
Women's Equality	{{{candidates}}}	0	Steady	0.0	0	0	0.0	151	0.3	

== Council Composition ==
Prior to the election the composition of the council was:

↓
23	21	12	1
Conservative	Labour	Liberal; Democrats	Ind

After the election the composition of the council was:

↓
23	19	15
Labour	Conservative	Liberal; Democrats

== Ward results ==
Changes in percentage of vote share are compared with when these seats were last up for election in 2015.

=== Bletchley East ===
Bletchley East
Party	Candidate	Votes	%	±%
Labour Co-op	Emily Darlington	1,176	45.5	+9.2
Conservative	Angela Kennedy	796	30.8	−2.8
Green	Jo Breen	473	18.3	+13.1
Liberal Democrats	Stephen Clark	139	5.4	+1.3
Turnout		2635	22.23	
Labour Co-op hold		Swing		

=== Bletchley Park ===
Bletchley Park
Party	Candidate	Votes	%	±%
Conservative	Nabeel Nazir	1,351	37.2	−3.1
Labour Co-op	Ed Hume	1335	36.8	+4.7
UKIP	Jane Duckworth	440	12.1	−5.1
Green	Michael Sheppard	289	8	+2.8
Liberal Democrats	Sean Barnes	213	5.9	+0.7
Turnout		3651	31.87	
Conservative hold		Swing		

=== Bletchley West ===
Bletchley West
Party	Candidate	Votes	%	±%
Labour Co-op	Lauren Townsend	1,259	38.5	+6.7
Conservative	Mo Imran	1115	34.1	−2.9
UKIP	Karl Downey	456	14	−5.3
Liberal Democrats	Matt Drewett	264	8.1	+2.9
Green	Joe French	175	5.4	−1.3
Turnout		3287	29.69	
Labour Co-op gain from Conservative		Swing		

=== Bradwell ===
Bradwell
Party	Candidate	Votes	%	±%
Liberal Democrats	Robin Bradburn	1,670	54.4	+21.6
Labour	Stephen Brown	854	27.8	−0.9
Conservative	Krishna Panthula	350	11.4	−9
Green	Colin Weaving	196	6.4	+2.3
Turnout		3117	31.11	
Liberal Democrats hold		Swing		

=== Broughton ===
Broughton
Party	Candidate	Votes	%	±%
Liberal Democrats	Kerrie Bradburn	1,624	48.9	+18.5
Conservative	Catriona Morris	1131	34	−11.9
Labour	Ola Oladoye	396	11.9	−6.4
Green	Alexander Price	173	6.4	−0.2
Turnout		3355	29.22	
Liberal Democrats gain from Conservative		Swing		

=== Campbell Park & Old Woughton ===
Campbell Park & Old Woughton
Party	Candidate	Votes	%	±%
Liberal Democrats	Paul Trendall	1,334	36.9	+8.9
Conservative	Peter McDonald	1322	36.6	+3.2
Labour	Adan Kahin	574	15.9	−5.9
Green	Carol Barac	232	6.4	−0.6
Women's Equality	Jane Whild	151	4.2	+4.2
Turnout		3643	36.27	
Liberal Democrats gain from Conservative		Swing		

=== Central Milton Keynes ===
Central Milton Keynes
Party	Candidate	Votes	%	±%
Labour	Paul Williams	1,058	49.7	+6.5
Liberal Democrats	Russell Houchin	410	19.2	+6.9
Independent	Darron Kendrick	334	15.7	+11.9
Green	Hilarie Bowman	325	15.3	+6.1
Turnout		2177	21.03	
Labour hold		Swing		

=== Danesborough & Walton ===
Danesborough & Walton
Party	Candidate	Votes	%	±%
Conservative	Alice Jenkins	1,528	53.1	−5.3
Green	Peter Skelton	528	18.3	+10.5
Labour	David Cockfield	455	15.8	−8.8
Liberal Democrats	Florence Montague	368	12.8	+3.6
Turnout		2924	30.74	
Conservative hold		Swing		

=== Loughton & Shenley ===
Loughton & Shenley
Party	Candidate	Votes	%	±%
Conservative	Amanda Marlow	1,609	42.3	−5.5
Labour Co-op	Ben Nolan	1573	41.4	+11.9
Green	Gill Kirkup	320	8.4	+2.7
Liberal Democrats	Andrew Kakabadse	302	7.9	+1.4
Turnout		3,998	38.58	−0.42
Conservative hold		Swing		

=== Monkston ===
Monkston
Party	Candidate	Votes	%	±%
Liberal Democrats	Leo Montague	1,383	57.1	+30.4
Conservative	Jaime Tamagnini	504	20.8	−21.9
Labour	Amber McQuillan	346	14.3	−9.6
Green	James Hadfield	188	7.8	+1.1
Turnout		2447	26.45	
Liberal Democrats gain from Conservative		Swing		

=== Newport Pagnell North & Hanslope ===
Newport Pagnell North & Hanslope
Party	Candidate	Votes	%	±%
Conservative	George Bowyer	1,681	49	−0.9
Liberal Democrats	Andrew Carr	675	19.7	+4.9
Labour	Alexander Chapman	526	15.3	+0.1
UKIP	Andrew Cole	280	8.2	−6
Green	Dan Rowland	268	7.8	+1.9
Turnout		3457	34.81	
Conservative hold		Swing		

=== Newport Pagnell South ===
Newport Pagnell South
Party	Candidate	Votes	%	±%
Liberal Democrats	Jane Carr	1,523	54	+17.5
Conservative	Christopher Paul Wardle	622	22.1	−8.4
Labour Co-op	Nick Phillips	434	15.4	−0.4
Green	Helen Den Dulk	241	8.6	+3.3
Turnout		2872	30.34	
Liberal Democrats hold		Swing		

=== Olney ===
Olney
Party	Candidate	Votes	%	±%
Conservative	David Hosking	2,071	58.2	−1
Labour	Dee Bethune	608	17.1	0
Green	Catherine Rose	354	10	+4.1
Liberal Democrats	Tony Oyakhire	309	8.7	+2.2
UKIP	Dana Green	215	6	−5.3
Turnout		3570		
Conservative hold		Swing		

=== Shenley Brook End ===
Shenley Brook End
Party	Candidate	Votes	%	±%
Conservative	Saleena Raja	1,000	34.4	+0.2
Liberal Democrats	Thais Portilho	963	33.1	+3.9
Labour	Shery Delfani	514	17.7	−2.9
UKIP	Ray Brady	241	8.3	−2.7
Green	Derek Heath	191	6.6	+1.4
Turnout		2920	29.75	
Conservative hold		Swing		

=== Stantonbury ===
Stantonbury
Party	Candidate	Votes	%	±%
Conservative	Alex Walker	1,532	40.9	+8.8
Labour	Emily Orchard	1422	38	+6.7
Green	Michael Sheppard	462	12.3	+4
Liberal Democrats	Alan Mallyon	328	8.8	−2.1
Turnout		3797	32.81	
Conservative hold		Swing		

=== Stony Stratford ===
Stony Stratford
Party	Candidate	Votes	%	±%
Labour Co-op	Anne Cryer-Whitehead	1,461	40.6	+12
Conservative	Paul Bartlett	1360	37.8	−3
Liberal Democrats	Richard Greenwood	356	9.9	+5.7
Green	Peter Hughes	240	6.7	−5.7
UKIP	Jeff Wyatt	186	5.2	−9
Turnout		3617	36.39	−1.21
Labour Co-op gain from Conservative		Swing		

=== Tattenhoe ===
Tattenhoe
Party	Candidate	Votes	%	±%
Conservative	James Lancaster	1,262	52.3	+0.1
Labour	Jack Basu-Mellish	698	28.9	+2.2
Green	Lucy Bjorck	275	11.4	+6.9
Liberal Democrats	Kathleen Greenwood	180	7.5	+1.1
Turnout		2433	29.11	
Conservative hold		Swing		

=== Wolverton ===
Wolverton
Party	Candidate	Votes	%	±%
Labour Co-op	Peter Marland	1,550	48.7	+11.6
Conservative	Qasim Awan	823	25.8	−2.1
Green	Alan Francis	539	16.9	+5.7
Liberal Democrats	Andrew Kelly	273	8.6	+2.3
Turnout		3227	28.7	
Labour hold		Swing		

=== Woughton & Fishermead ===
Woughton & Fishermead
Party	Candidate	Votes	%	±%
Labour Co-op	Carole Baume	1,419	60.4	+6.6
Conservative	David Priest	479	20.4	+1.7
Green	Susan Payne	283	12.0	+6.4
Liberal Democrats	Rebecca Verkade-Cave	170	7.2	+3.1
Turnout		2406	20.66	
Labour Co-op hold		Swing		
