= Mandu Reid =

Leader of the Women's Equality Party, UK

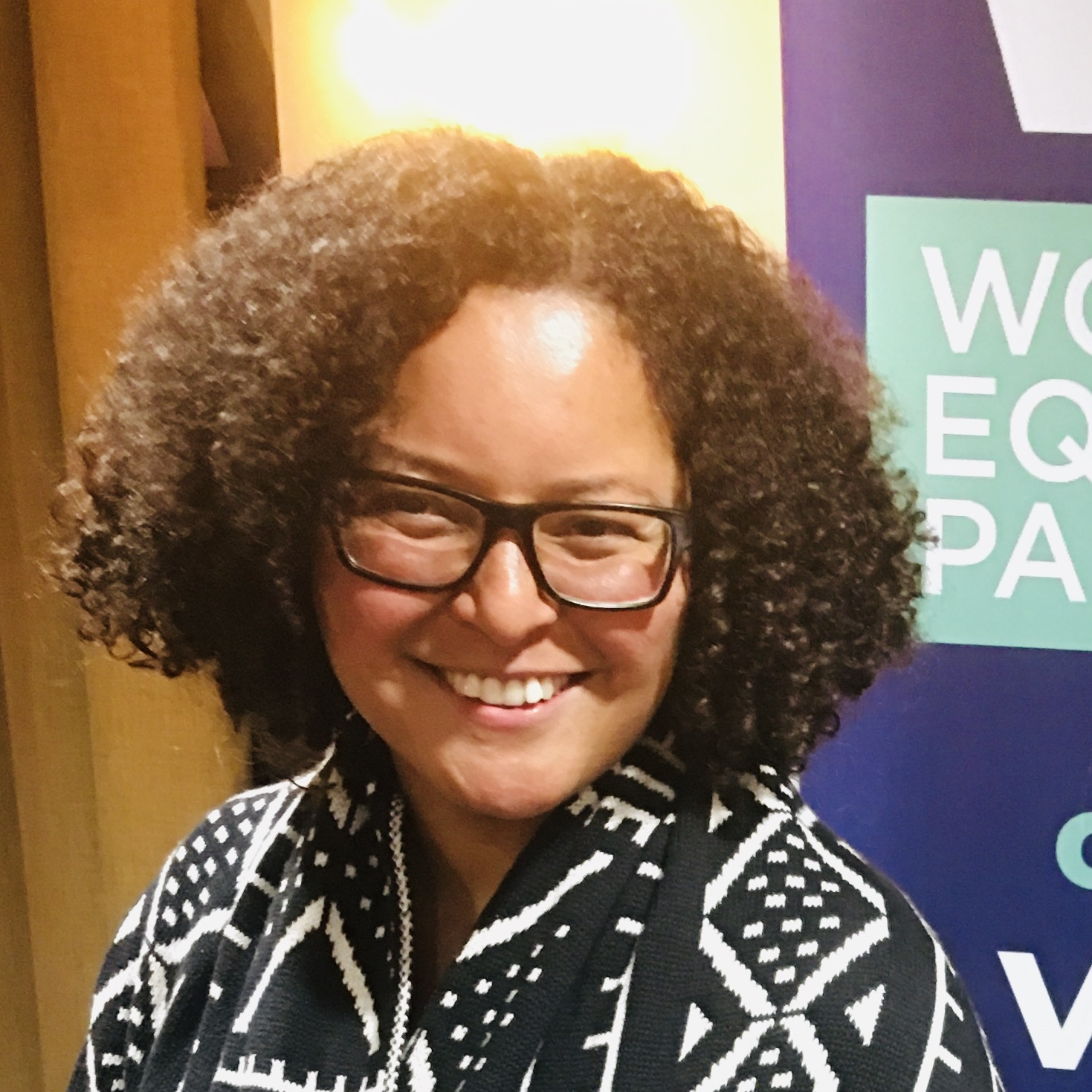
- Mandu Reid in Manchester on 30 September 2021. Photo by Carol Ann Whitehead.

Leader of the Women's Equality Party
- In office April 2019 – 17 November 2024
- Preceded by: Sophie Walker
- Succeeded by: Office abolished

Personal details
- Born: 1981 (age 44–45) Malawi
- Education: London School of Economics
- Occupation: Politician

Mandu Kate Reid (born 1981) is a Malawi-born British politician and activist who was the leader of Women's Equality Party (WEP) from April 2019 until its dissolution in November 2024.

== Early life and education ==
Reid's mother is Black Malawi and her father is White British. Her parents met while her father was teaching English in Malawi, where Reid was born. The family moved to the United Kingdom in 1982, but subsequently lived in Somalia and Eswatini (once known as Swaziland), before returning to the UK, where Reid attended sixth form. Concerning her growing up in Eswatini, Reid said that being a mixed-race child led to awareness in childhood of injustice and prejudice.

While at school in England, Reid experienced racist abuse as the only black student in her school.

Reid is a graduate of the London School of Economics.

== Career ==
After graduating from LSE, Reid worked at in project and programme management for HM Treasury, the Department for Culture, Media and Sport and the Greater London Authority.

Reid founded The Cup Effect in 2015, a period poverty charity which campaigns donates menstrual cups to women and girls struggling with period poverty in the UK and East Africa.

=== Political career ===
Reid joined the Labour Party in 2010, but later moved to the Women's Equality Party (WEP) in 2018. As a member of WEP, Reid stood in the 2018 Lewisham East by-election, coming fifth and losing her deposit. Despite not being a parent at the time, Reid has supported equal parenting policies and flexible working as the party spokesperson on equal parenting since 2018. Reid has spoken publicly about her abortion, which was what sparked her interest in equal parenting policies and promoted her to pursue a career in politics. Talking about her abortion, she said:

It is strange to me, when I reflect on it now, that neither of us could imagine a scenario where I wasn't the sole caregiver of the child and the main breadwinner....I crunched the numbers and realised at that point in time, I couldn't balance being a single mother and hold on to my career aspirations...so I had a termination. It wasn't an easy choice.

In April 2019, Reid took over the interim leadership of WEP, and was confirmed as party leader in January 2020. She has been described as "the first black, bisexual leader of a political party in the UK".

In response to the Black Lives Matter movement, and murder of George Floyd in the U.S., Reid wrote to prime minister Boris Johnson to express support for the movement. Under Reid's leadership, the Women's Equality Party released a statement which highlighted racial injustice in the UK.

Reid was the party's candidate for the 2021 London mayoral election, having replaced Sue Black, who had to withdraw for health reasons. She came tenth and lost her deposit.

Reid has written opinion articles for The Independent and The Huffington Post.

Party political offices
Preceded by Sophie Walker	Leader of the Women's Equality Party; 2019–	Incumbent
