= Congleton Town Council =

UK local authority for the town of Congleton, Cheshire, England

- Coat of arms of Congleton Town Council

Type
- Type: Town Council

History
- Founded: 1980

Leadership
- Town Mayor: Cllr Suzy Firkin
- Deputy Mayor: Cllr Robert Douglas
- Chief Officer: Adam Keppel-Green FSLCC

Structure
- Seats: 22 councillors
- Liberal Democrats: 2 / 22
- Conservative: 11 / 22
- Independent: 3 / 22
- Equality Party: 2 / 22
- Labour: 2 / 22
- Reform UK: 1 / 22
- Civic Independent Party: 1 / 22

Elections
- Last election: 4 May 2023

Website
- www.congleton-tc.gov.uk

Congleton Town Council is the town council for Congleton which was established in 1980.

== Councillors ==
The current list of councillors in Congleton Town Council, following the local elections on 4 May 2023. NOTE: two councillors of the Women's Equality Party joined the Equality Party when WEP folded in December 2024. NOTE: One Reform UK councillor was elected in a by-election in May 2026. NOTE: One Independent councillor joined the Civic Independent Party in 2026.

Name	Party	Ward
Cllr Dawn Sarah Elizabeth Allen	Conservative	Congleton North
Cllr Russell George Chadwick	Conservative	Congleton North
Cllr Gary Reginald Wilson	Reform UK	Congleton North
Cllr Amanda Marjorie Martin	Conservative	Congleton North
Cllr Liz Wardlaw	Conservative	Congleton Central
Cllr Heather Seddon	Labour	Congleton Central
Cllr Mark Edwardson	Independent	Congleton Central
Cllr Richard Walton	Labour	Congleton Central
Cllr David Brown	Conservative	Congleton South East
Cllr Arabella Holland	Conservative	Congleton South East
Cllr Sally Ann Holland	Conservative	Congleton South East
Cllr Heather Pearce	Independent	Congleton South East
Cllr Kay Wesley	Equality Party	Congleton South East
Cllr Suzanne Marie Akers Smith	Independent	Congleton West
Cllr Robert Julian Douglas	Liberal Democrats	Congleton West
Cllr Suzy Firkin	Liberal Democrats	Congleton West
Cllr Robert Brittain	Conservative	Congleton West
Cllr Charles Booth	Conservative	Congleton North East
Cllr Glen Williams	Conservative	Congleton North East
Cllr Rob Moreton	Civic Independent Party	Congleton North East
Cllr Susan Mead	Equality Party	Congleton North East
Cllr Shaun Radcliffe	Independent	Congleton North East

The table below shows current and former compositions of the council.

Election	Conservative	Independent	Labour	Liberal Democrats	UKIP	Equality Party	Reform UK	Civic Independent Party
2011	17	3	0	0	0	-	-	-
2015	18	0	1	0	1	-	-	-
2019	6	6	0	7	-	1 (WEP)	-	-
2023	11	5	2	2	-	2 (WEP)	-	-
Current	11	3	2	2	0	2	1	1
