= Sophie Walker =

British political activist (born 1971)

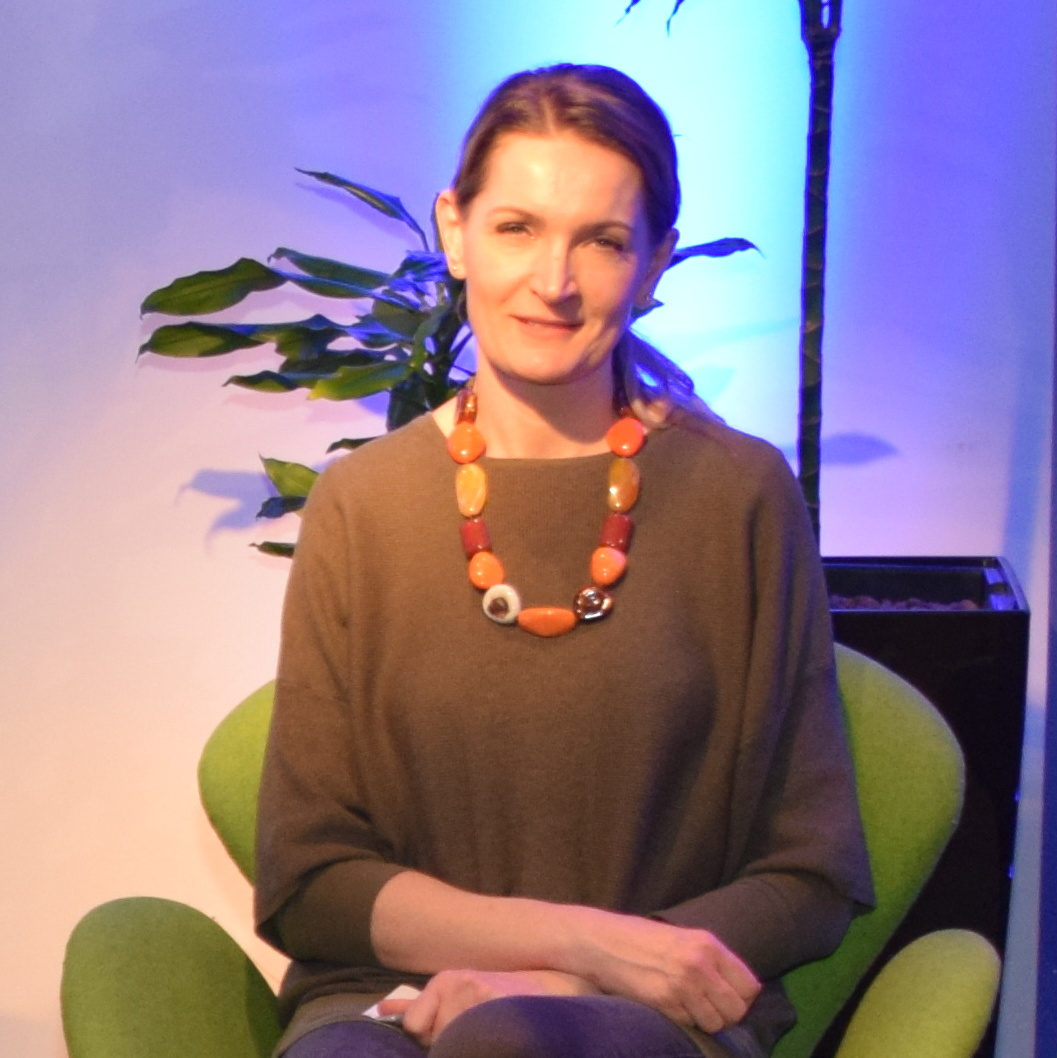
- Walker in 2018

Leader of the Women's Equality Party
- In office 22 July 2015 – 22 January 2019
- Preceded by: Sandi Toksvig (co-founder); Catherine Mayer (co-founder)
- Succeeded by: Mandu Reid

Personal details
- Born: 27 May 1971 (age 55) Blackpool, Lancashire, England
- Party: Women's Equality Party (Until 2024)
- Spouse: Christopher Naylor
- Education: University of Reading
- Occupation: Politician
- Website: Women's Equality Party
External videos
- Press Association interview with Sophie Walker
- "Sandi Toksvig's Women's Equality Party name Sophie Walker as leader" via YouTube

Sophie Walker (born 27 May 1971) is a British political activist who was the founding leader of the Women's Equality Party (WE) in the United Kingdom.

She led the party from 2015 until 2019, first appointed unanimously by the steering committee and then winning the Party's first leadership election in 2018. She announced her resignation in January 2019, saying she was "frustrated by the limits of my own work to ensure that women of colour, working class women and disabled women see themselves reflected in this party and know they can lead this movement" and adding that "sometimes in order to lead, you have to get out of the way." Walker was the WE party candidate in the 2016 London mayoral election and in the 2017 General Election stood for WE against Conservative MP Philip Davies in Shipley.

She was appointed Chief Executive of the Young Women's Trust in June 2019.

== Early life ==
Walker was born on 27 May 1971, the daughter of Lesley and David Walker. She was born in Blackpool, in England, but grew up in Glasgow, in Scotland.

She attended university in England, studying English and French at the University of Reading (1989–1993). Walker then took a postgraduate diploma in newspaper journalism at City University, in London (1997–1998).

== Journalist ==
Walker's early career was in journalism, working as a reporter and then as an editor at the Reuters news agency. She covered the fields of finance, business and trade, plus politics. She reported from London, Paris and Washington and from Iraq, Afghanistan and Pakistan.

== Women's Equality Party ==
Walker launched the policy manifesto of the Women's Equality Party (WE) at Conway Hall, 20 October 2015, with six core objectives: equal representation in politics and business; equal representation in education; equal pay; equal treatment of women in the media; equal parenting rights; and an end to violence against women. Walker told BBC Radio Wales Sunday Supplement programme that the party would be taking a non-partisan approach to elections, "We will be undertaking consultations with our members and deciding which seats to target." WE is the only UK political party to offer affiliate membership with other parties.

Under Walker's leadership the party grew to 75 UK branches and contested local, national and mayoral elections. It held two party conferences and ran multiple nationwide campaigns on topics related to its party objectives.

Walker was elected party leader in March 2018 with over 90% of the vote. The term of office is five years and was due to run until 2023, but Walker resigned in early 2019 citing frustration at the lack of diversity within the party. Walker was replaced as leader by Mandu Reid.

=== London mayoral election, 2016 ===
Walker stood for election in the London mayoral election held on 5 May 2016. She came sixth, with 53,055 votes (2% of the vote).

=== UK general election, 2017 ===
Walker stood in the 2017 general election in Shipley against the sitting Conservative MP Philip Davies, an anti-political correctness and men's rights campaigner. She received 1,040 votes (1.9%) and finished fourth out of four candidates.

== Family life ==
Walker is married to Christopher Naylor, the former chief executive officer of Barking and Dagenham council. They live in London and have one daughter.

Grace, Walker's daughter from a previous marriage, has Asperger's syndrome and Walker wrote a blog to give a platform to her daughter's experiences. This was published as the book Grace Under Pressure. Walker has accepted an advocacy role with the National Autistic Society.

== Media appearances ==
Walker has appeared on a number of media broadcasts within the UK including a panel discussion on free speech and equality with Jordan Peterson and Michael Fabricant for The Wright Stuff. Regarding the discussion she stated: "I think the difference between Jordan and me is that we look at evidence and we lean towards different theories. So, Jordan's theory is very much evolutionary, that there are inherent differences in men and women, mine is very much more social role theory, if you like, that men and women are taking on different roles due to the expectations that society puts on them." In 2015, she was listed as one of BBC's 100 Women. In 2018, Walker was named by Vogue magazine as one of the "New Suffragettes".

== Publications ==
Books

- Grace under pressure: going the distance as an Asperger's mum. London: Hachette Digital. 2012. ISBN 9781405516082.

Articles

- "European farmers feel Russian sanctions bite". Reuters. London. 8 August 2014. Archived from the original on 6 March 2016.
- "Our party's going to reclaim women's equality: help us make it happen". The Guardian. 24 July 2015.
- "You can't build a movement of people who look and sound the same". New Statesman. 23 January 2019.

Broadcast Media

- Our interview with Sophie Walker (YouTube). www.thefemalelead.com. 19 August 2015.
- In 2017, having led them to the final with two victories, Walker captained a team of celebrity former students from Reading University in Christmas University Challenge that was the first in the 55-year history of the quiz to fail to get a single question right.

Party political offices
Preceded by Catherine Mayer and Sandi Toksvig as co-founders	Leader of the Women's Equality Party; 2015 - 2019 (22 July 2015 - 8 March 2018 as interim leader)	Succeeded by Mandu Reid (interim)
