= Women's Equality Party =

Former UK political party

- Abbreviation: WE; WEP
- Leader: Mandu Reid
- Founders: Sandi Toksvig; Catherine Mayer
- Founded: 2 March 2015; 11 years ago
- Dissolved: 17 November 2024; 23 months ago
- Succeeded by: Alliance for Womens Equality (Richmond, London); All In (Basingstoke); Equality Party (Congleton, Cheshire)
- Headquarters: Kemp House; 152–160 City Road; London; EC1V 2NX
- Membership (October 2024): More than 5,600 members (and around 24,000 registered supporters)
- Ideology: Feminism
- Colours: Purple; Green; WSPU colours

Website
- equalityparty.org.uk

The Women's Equality Party (WEP) was a feminist political party in the United Kingdom that existed from 2015 to 2024. The idea was conceived by Catherine Mayer and Sandi Toksvig at the Women of the World Festival, when they concluded that there was a need for a party to campaign for gender equality to the benefit of all. The launch meeting was on 28 March 2015 under the title "The Women's Equality Party needs you. But probably not as much as you need the Women's Equality Party". The party's full policy was launched by its then-leader Sophie Walker at Conway Hall on 20 October 2015. In January 2020, Mandu Reid took over as the party's leader.

The party had one principal authority councillor on Basingstoke and Deane Borough Council, elected in 2024. It also had two seats on Congleton Town Council, where Kay Wesley served as the party's first Town Mayor, and had a seat on Stinsford Parish Council.

It was dissolved on 17 November 2024. Former members went on to form the Equality Party, the All In Party and the Alliance for Women's Equality.

== History ==
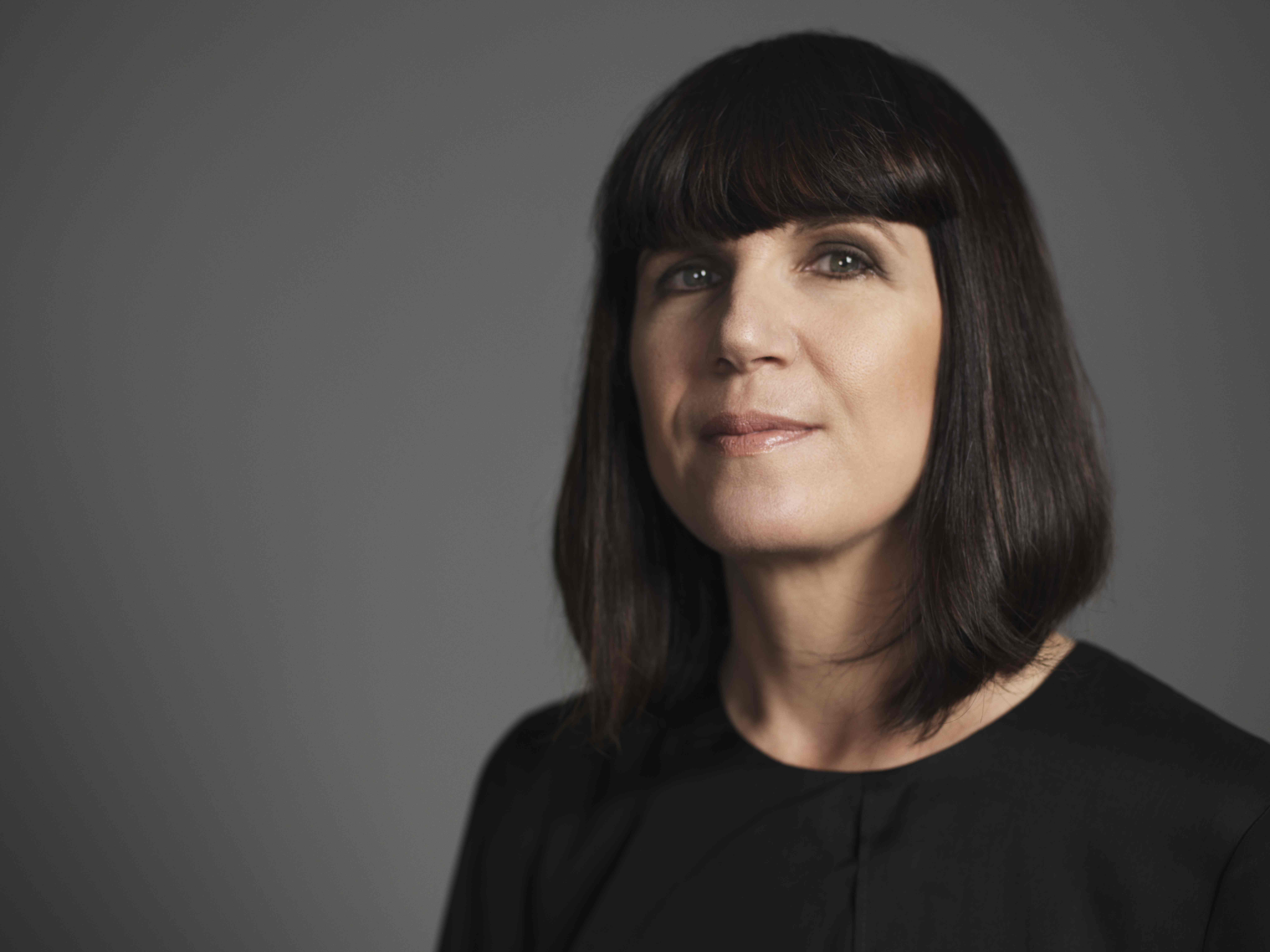
Catherine Mayer

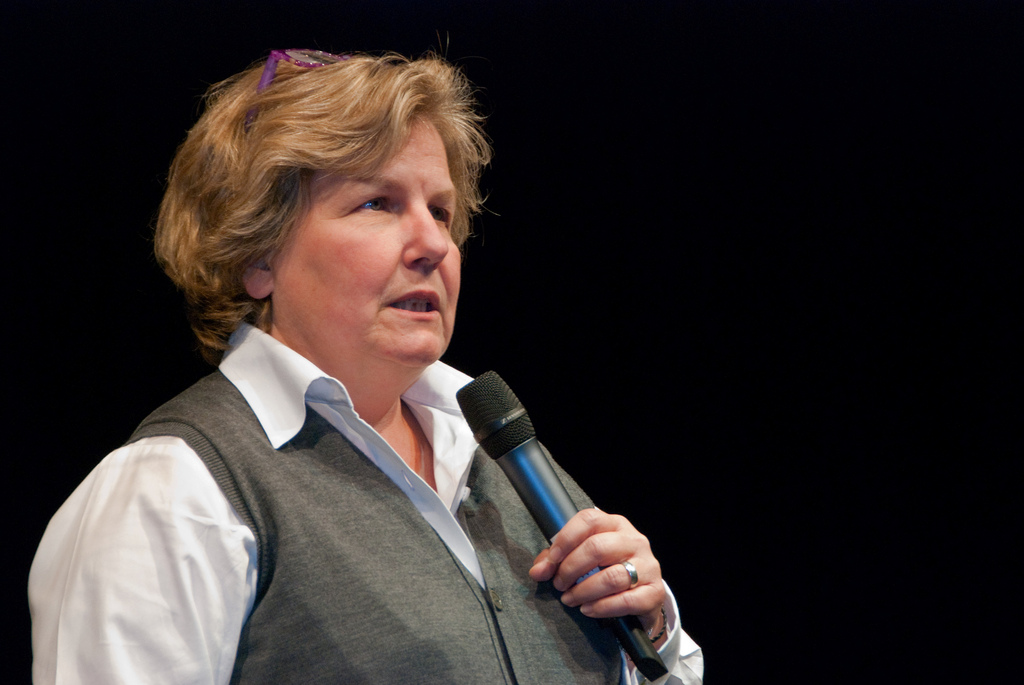
Sandi Toksvig

Co-founders of the Women's Equality Party

On 2 March 2015, author and journalist Catherine Mayer attended a "Women in Politics" event at the Women of the World Festival (at the Southbank Centre in central London). The panel was chaired by Jude Kelly (Artistic Director, Southbank Centre), and the panel consisted of Katie Ghose (CEO, Electoral Reform Society), Margot James (Conservative), Stella Creasy (Labour) and Jo Swinson (Lib Dem). Having watched the panelists agreeing collegially with each other on almost every point, Mayer stood up and said, "What about if I found a Women's Equality Party, tell you what, I'm going to go to the bar afterwards, anyone interested in discussing this come and see me."

On 8 March 2015 (International Women's Day), at the same festival, comedian Sandi Toksvig presented an event entitled "Sandi Toksvig's Mirth Control: Stand Up and Be Counted". Interviewed by Jenni Murray on BBC Radio 4's Woman's Hour, Toksvig said: "I had a fantasy cabinet of women, and I didn't care which party they came from, we had Doreen Lawrence as our Home Secretary. Can you imagine anything more wonderful? We had paralympian Tanni Grey-Thompson as our Sports Minister, and I asked them to put forward practical suggestions. The world is in a parlous state, 9.1 million women failed to vote in the last election, we need to attract them, we also need to attract the more than 7 million men who didn't vote. Why are people not engaged in politics, because I don't think that the people standing represent the diversity of this country." Mayer phoned Toksvig, and the two agreed to become co-founders of the party.

The first meeting of the as yet unnamed party was on 28 March 2015. Speakers included: Suzanne Moore, who had previously stood for parliament as an independent candidate; Sophie Walker, who spoke on careers, parenting and ensuring that both parents have opportunities in both; Halla Gunnarsdóttir, who described a women's equality party in Iceland; and Hannah McGrath, who discussed the practicalities of starting a party. The meeting was covered on Woman's Hour and by the press, including Glamour magazine and the London Evening Standard.

External videos
- TEDx talk by Sandi Toksvig
- A political party for women's equality via TEDx Talks on YouTube

A second meeting took place at Conway Hall on 18 April, and included Sandi Toksvig, Mandy Colleran, Nimko Ali, Shabnam Shabazi and Stella Duffy as speakers.

On 30 April, Toksvig announced that she was leaving her position as compère of Radio 4's The News Quiz in order to help set up the new political party, which was now named the Women's Equality Party. Speaking at the Hay Festival in May, Toksvig reported that since she had announced the move on BBC One's The One Show, she had been subjected to a significant level of abuse online.

The Women's Equality Party was registered with the Electoral Commission on 20 July 2015. On 22 July, Reuters journalist Sophie Walker was announced as the party's first leader. Walker went on to stand in Shipley at the 2017 general election, but lost to Conservative Party MP and men's rights activist Philip Davies.

=== Leadership contest 2018 ===
The party announced its first leadership contest in December 2017. Nominations opened on 5 January 2018, and closed on 24 January. Two candidates were nominated: interim leader Sophie Walker and Magda Devas, who had previously run for the Green Party in the Streatham Wells ward in the Lambeth London Borough Council election of 2010 and that of 2014. The ballot opened on 14 February 2018, and closed on 6 March; Walker was declared the winner on 8 March.

Candidate	Votes	%	Sources
Magda Devas	550	9.90	
Sophie Walker	5,002	90.10	

Walker had been due to serve a five-year term until 2023 but resigned 10 months later, stating "sometimes in order to lead, you have to get out of the way". She was replaced by interim leader Mandu Reid, the party's national spokesperson on equal parenting and caregiving, its candidate in the 2018 Lewisham East by-election, and the CEO of period poverty charity The Cup Effect.

=== Decision to dissolve party ===
In October 2024, it was reported that the party's founders planned to dissolve the WEP pending the approval of the party's membership in November, citing financial difficulties and changes in the political environment. The party then had about 5,600 members and 24,000 registered supporters. This reportedly followed a failed attempt by the leadership of the WEP and the Green Party of England and Wales to formalise a partnership, with the motion to allow this failing to muster support at the Green Party conference.

At a special conference on 17 November 2024, 78% of members voted to dissolve the party, surpassing the 75% threshold for this vote to pass.

== Political aims and views ==
The party's mission statement opened with: "Equality for women isn't a women's issue. When women fulfil their potential, everyone benefits. Equality means better politics, a more vibrant economy, a workforce that draws on the talents of the whole population and a society at ease with itself".

- Equal representation in politics and business;
- Equal representation in education;
- Equal pay;
- Equal treatment of women by and in the media;
- Equal parenting rights;
- An end to violence against women.
— Women's Equality Party, six stated goals of the party

Describing the six aims, Mayer said: "It's a very narrow palette, we're not looking to be a party that can answer questions about what should be done in the Ukraine, or trying to have a platform on the environment or anything else, we are focusing absolutely narrowly on that equality agenda." Party leader Walker agreed: "We won't have policies on other issues. We are going to concentrate, laser-like, on all of the above, to make them happen. And we will welcome people from any other political party that agrees with our values of diversity and inclusivity to work with us." However, Walker promised that the party's working definition of the word "woman", as well as more detail of the party's policies, would be covered in its policy launch, following consultation with party members.

Early indications of what to expect included Walker's call for a gender quota system to select MPs at the following two elections so that equal representation could be achieved in the House of Commons by 2025. Walker also called for six weeks' paid leave, at 90% pay, for both parents after having a baby, as well as an extra 10 months of shared leave at statutory pay. Writing in the Daily Mirror, Toksvig stated that the party further proposed that industrial tribunal costs be reduced from over £1,000 to "£50 for those who can afford it" in order to "empower all women to speak out about sexism at work."

The party launched its full set of policies on 20 October 2015 at Conway Hall.

=== First party conference ===
The inaugural Women's Equality Party conference took place in Manchester on 25–27 November 2016, with opening speeches by founders Catherine Mayer and Sandi Toksvig on the first day, and Sophie Walker's leader's speech on the second day.

Motions carried at the conference include: a motion to expand the UK's definition of hate crime to include misogyny; a motion to strengthen the legislation for carers who need flexible working arrangements; and a motion to fully decriminalise abortion across the UK (the current Abortion Act excludes Northern Ireland).

Other speakers at the Conference included CEO of the Young Women’s Trust Carole Easton, psychologist Carolyn Kagan, former President of the National Union of Students Shakira Martin, sexual harassment lawyer Dr. Ann Olivarius, and Swedish politician Gudrun Schyman.

==== Additional party goal ====
A seventh goal of the party was added to the existing six at the party's first conference.

- Equality in healthcare and medical research. — Women's Equality Party, additional goal of the party.

=== Second party conference ===
The second party conference took place in Kettering in September 2018. Among the motions passed was one supporting the People's Vote campaign calling for a public vote on the final Brexit deal between the United Kingdom and the European Union.

=== Abortion ===
During its existence the party supported removing abortion from criminal law and supported safe access to abortions.

=== Position regarding gender self-identification ===
In November 2022, the party voted in support of a motion to back gender self-identification. Of the party members who took part in the vote at the party's conference, 138 voted in favour of gender self-identification, while 29 opposed, and 5 abstained.

== The party's name ==
The party's name was "debated and discussed at two public meetings". When Toksvig was asked why the party was named the Women's Equality Party, rather than just the Equality Party, she answered: "Because there is a huge issue, women are certainly not equal.... It's time that women, finally, after all these years, what is it, almost a hundred years since we finally got the vote, it's time we stepped up and took our equal place in society." She also stated the party's motto, "Equality is better for everybody". Mayer also stated, "I'm very happy with the name: all genders are joining us and I hope they continue to. More than half the population is living in inequality and that is genuinely not good for everyone, economically or culturally."

== Elections ==
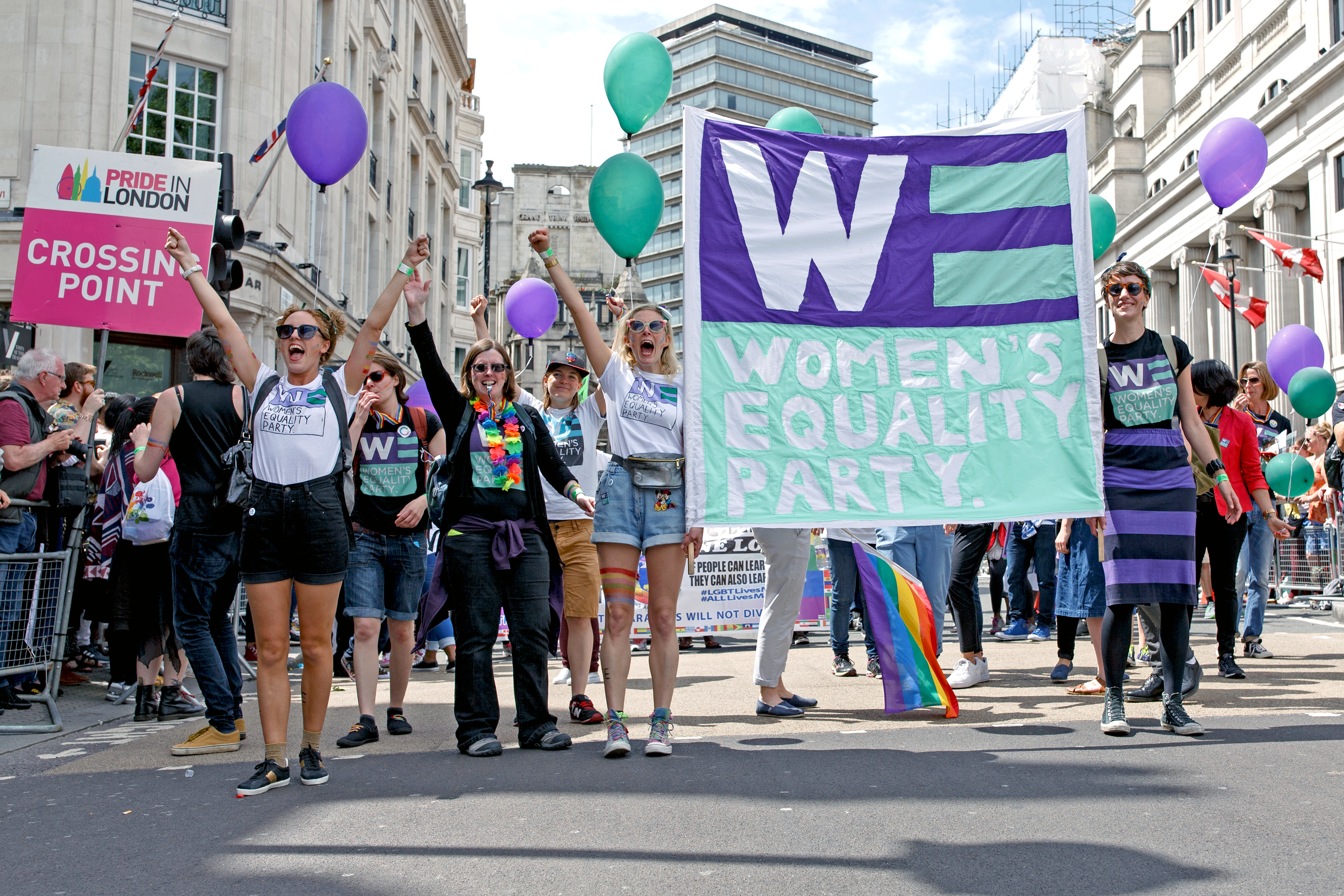
Members of the Women's Equality Party at Trafalgar Square during the Pride in London 2016 parade

=== 2015 ===
The party did not field any candidates in the 2015 general election, but planned to do so when the next election was assumed to be in 2020. Walker told BBC Radio Wales' Sunday Supplement programme that the party would be taking a non-partisan approach to elections, stating that "We will be undertaking consultations with our members and deciding which seats to target". Figures from the party suggested that there was a possibility that an existing Member of Parliament (MP) might defect to the party before the party contested an election, citing the example of how the UK Independence Party got its first MPs. although this did not happen. Initially Walker neither ruled in or out the possibility of a WEP candidate in the 2016 London mayoral election: "We'd like to. It's a £20,000 losable deposit, though. If you're Zac Goldsmith that's not such a big deal but if a woman from a normal background wants to speak out for women and do it with the mayorship, automatically she's almost excluded". However, in October 2015, the party announced its intention to field candidates in the 2016 London Assembly election.

=== 2016 ===
Following various fundraisers, the party was able to field candidates in the 2016 London elections (Walker in the Mayoral election, plus candidates for the London Assembly); Scottish Parliament election, Glasgow region (Anne Beetham, Susan Mackay, Ruth Wilkinson, Calum Shepherd, Penelope Haddrill, Carol Young) and Lothian region (Lee Chalmers, Jennifer Royston, Catriona MacDonald and Abigail Herrmann); and the Welsh Assembly election in South Wales Central (Sharon Lovell, Emma Rose, Sarah Rees and Ruth Williams).

Supporters of the WEP's election bid included: Emma Thompson, Lily Allen, Hugh Quarshie, Tanya Moodie, Philippa Perry, Jack Monroe, Jo Brand, Rosie Boycott and Caitlin Moran.

The WEP did not win any seats in the elections: Walker gained 53,055 votes (2.04%) in the first round of voting for London mayor. The party's best result was on the London-wide list where it finished sixth with 91,772 votes (3.5%).

Anne Beetham gained 2,091 votes (0.8%) in Glasgow and Lee Chalmers gained 3,877 votes (1.2%) in Lothian. Overall the WEP obtained 5,968 votes, 0.3% of the Scottish vote.

Sharon Lovell, Emma Rose, Sarah Rees and Ruth Williams gained 2,807 votes, 1.2% of the total vote in South Wales Central.

The overall total number of votes cast for the party in Scotland, Wales and London was 350,000.

=== 2017 ===
Tabitha Morton from Netherton stood in the Liverpool City Region mayoral election. She came seventh, receiving 4,287 first round votes (1.5%).

In the 2017 general election the party stood seven candidates. None was elected, and all lost their deposits. The best result among them was by Sophie Walker coming fourth in Shipley against the sitting Conservative MP Philip Davies, a men's rights and anti-political correctness campaigner. The party targeted Davies's seat because of his role in blocking legislation that would have implemented better support for domestic violence victims, and because of his public comments about women, people with disabilities and LGBT people. Academics Emily Harmer and Rosalynd Southern write that: "Targeting Davies was controversial due to fears over potential vote-splitting and the fact that the WEP failed to engage with local feminist groups". The full list of WEP candidates in the 2017 general election is below:

Constituency	Candidate	Votes	%	Source(s)
Hornsey and Wood Green	Nimco Ali	551	0.9	
Manchester Withington	Sally Carr	234	0.4	
Shipley	Sophie Walker	1,040	1.9	
Stirling	Kirstein Rummery	337	0.7	
Tunbridge Wells	Celine Thomas	702	1.3	
Vale of Glamorgan	Sharon Lovell	177	0.3	
Vauxhall	Harini Iyengar	539	1.0	

=== 2018 ===
The party put up candidates in more than 30 elections in the local elections of 2018.^{Note 1} None were elected.

Mandu Reid stood as a candidate for the WEP in the 2018 Lewisham East by-election; she came fifth out of the 14 candidates, receiving 506 votes (2.3%).

=== 2019 ===
==== General election ====
The party put forward three candidates at the 2019 general election, all of whom lost their deposits, due to winning a low number of votes.

Constituency	Candidate	Votes	%	Source(s)
Bury South	Gemma Evans	130	0.3	
Luton North	Serena Laidley	149	0.3	
Dover	Eljai Morais	137	0.3	

These constituencies have previously had an MP suspended from his respective party because of allegations of sexual assault or harassment, although all three MPs that had been accused did not seek re-election. Two prospective WEP candidates in Sheffield Hallam and the Cities of London and Westminster stood aside to support the Liberal Democrats after they agreed to implement a WEP policy to challenge two MPs, one accused of writing sexist messages online and the other of grabbing and manhandling a female environmental protester.

==== Local elections ====
The party put up candidates in more than 20 of the local elections of 2019.^{Note 2} The party saw its first councillor, Kay Wesley, elected. Wesley was standing as the sole Women's Equality Party candidate and received 1250 votes (a 5.7% share of the vote) to represent the East Ward on Congleton Town Council.

=== 2020 ===
In January 2020, Mandu Reid was announced as the party leader following her role as interim leader since early 2019.

=== 2021 ===
Reid was the party's candidate for the 2021 London mayoral election on 6 May 2021, having replaced Sue Black, who had to withdraw for health reasons. Reid finished tenth in the mayoral election with 21,182 votes (0.8%). The party also stood on the London-wide list in the 2021 London Assembly election, coming fifth with 55,684 votes (2.2%), a fall compared to their previous result.

It also stood 3 candidates in the Lothian region (coming tenth with 0.3%, down 0.9% from the previous election) and 4 candidates in the Glasgow region (coming tenth with 0.3%, down 0.5% from the previous election) for the 2021 Scottish Parliament election. Hannah Barham-Brown stood for the Party in the 2021 North Yorkshire Police, Fire and Crime Commissioner by-election, finishing fifth with 8,837 (10.2%) of the first-round votes. The election was called following the resignation of Philip Allott, following widely criticised comments he had made about Sarah Everard.

=== 2022 ===
The party stood two candidates in the 2022 City of London Corporation election, both of whom came last in their wards. Harini Iyengar received an 11.1% share of the vote in the ward of Bread Street out of four candidates, while Alison Smith received a 3.2% share of the vote in the ward of Portsoken out of seven candidates.

=== 2023 ===
The party stood 14 candidates in the local elections of 2023.^{Note 3} Kay Wesley was re-elected to Congleton Town Council for the South East Ward (925 votes, a 12.2% share and 43.3% voters supporting on multi-vote ballot) and a second party candidate, Susan Mead, elected in Congleton North East (702 votes, a 15.3% share and 45.7% voters supporting on multi-vote ballot). Wesley narrowly missed election to Cheshire East Council by 19 votes (polling 1132, an 11.5% share and 30.2% of voters choosing WEP on multi-vote ballots). WEP Candidate Stacy Hart came second in Basingstoke and Deane Borough Council, with 925 votes to the Conservatives' 1000 (36.8% vote/voter share).

=== 2024 ===
On 8 April, Women's Equality Party candidate Sarah Pattison was appointed to Stinsford Parish Council in Dorset, in an uncontested election. In the 2024 local elections a Women's Equality Party candidate, Stacy Hart, was elected to Basingstoke and Deane Borough Council for the Hatch Warren & Beggarwood ward; Hart was elected with 1,659 votes (61.6%), gaining the seat from the Conservatives.

In the 2024 general election, the party put forward four candidates:

Constituency	Candidate	Votes	%	Source(s)
Mid and South Pembrokeshire	Hanna Andersen	254	0.5%	
Caerfyrddin	Nancy Cole	282	0.6%	
Congleton	Kay Wesley	544	1.1%	
Godalming and Ash	Harriet Williams	195	0.4%	

== Membership and local organisations ==
Reportedly, 1,300 people joined the party on the day that it opened up membership, which costs £4 per month. In the first financial year, the party raised £512,219 in membership fees. As of 13 October 2015, 65 local and regional Women's Equality Party groups had been founded, and in July 2016 the party reported that it had 65,000 members. The WEP was described as "the fastest growing political force in the UK" in a Daily Telegraph article on the party's campaigning for the May 2016 London mayoral election. The party's membership reportedly grew from 25,000 to 55,000 in the month following the European Union membership referendum. In September 2020, it was reported that the party's membership was 30,000.

On 26 October 2024, it was reported that the party had "more than 5,600 paying members and about 24,000 registered supporters".

== Fundraising and donations ==
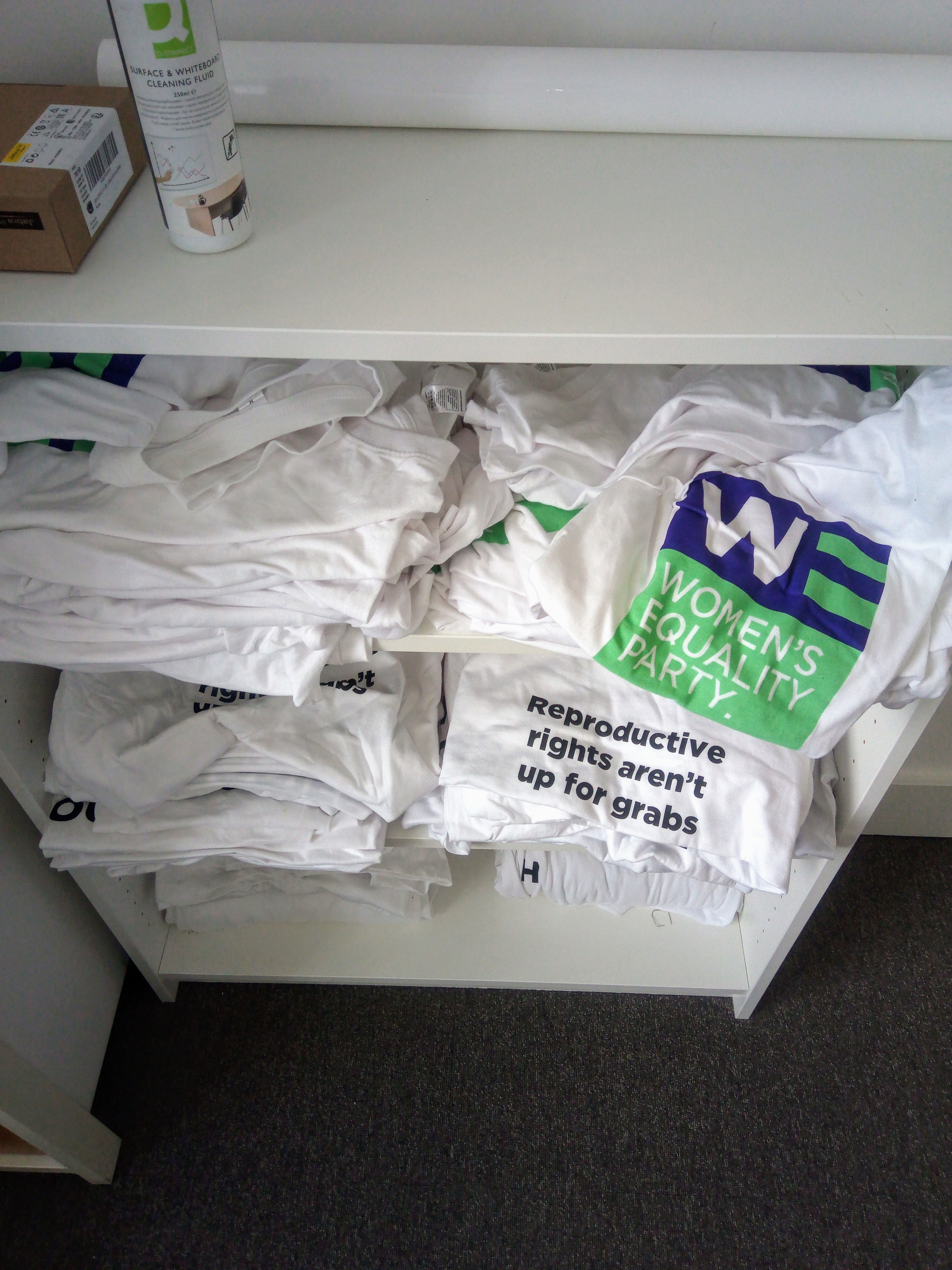
Women's Equality Party t-shirts

The party's first fundraiser – held in front of 400 people, including businesswoman Martha Lane Fox – took place at Conway Hall on 9 June 2015. In September that year Toksvig announced the dates for a comedy tour to raise funds for the party. In the party's first year (ending 31 December 2015) £512,219 was raised through membership fees, £38,528 through fundraising activities and £79,212 was raised through donations.

The artist Damien Hirst created a piece of work for auction entitled "Spin Drawing for Women's Equality" (2015). The piece, which contained the party's colours, raised £20,000 when it was auctioned in April 2016. The artists Jake and Dinos Chapman also began a campaign, stamping the words "Womens Equality Party" onto 2p coins and then returning them into circulation. (Suffragettes had also defaced pennies.)

In the party's second year (ending 31 December 2016) £447,946 was raised through membership fees, £35,918 through fundraising activities and £261,394 was raised through donations.

== Criticisms ==
A year before the creation of the WEP, Suzanne Moore suggested in The Guardian that a feminist party should be formed, saying: "the false doctrine of austerity has meant that women, single mothers in particular, and public sector workers in general, have been at the frontline of this war. They have been demonised and subject to punitive cuts." Writing in The Telegraph, Kate Maltby responded by saying, "My feminism is directly tied to a commitment to meritocracy and individual flourishing...if her [Moore's] grand new feminist party kicks off by nationalising private property, I'm hardly going to be able to sign up".

The British edition of GQ also accused the party of "alienating 50 per cent of the electorate", adding that: "while the WEP may aim to appeal to both female Tory voters and female Labour voters, it doesn't take away from the implicit suggestion that the party – which aims for 'diverse' membership – is still aimed almost solely at women". The party was also criticised "for being comprised mainly of white, middle-class affluent women".

The International Union of Sex Workers (IUSW) criticised the party's stance on supporting the criminalisation of commercial sex. This policy was also criticised by other women, including the journalist Abi Wilkinson. The Sex Worker Advocacy and Resistance Movement (SWARM), Scot-Pep, and National Ugly Mugs all condemned the way the then party leader Sophie Walker spoke about a sex worker in 2018. The organisations rejected the party's idea of criminalisation in the sex industry, with the organisations saying that they do not support increased police powers, nor enforcement against sex workers, and that criminalisation would do nothing to end poverty or give migrants better work options.

The party was also accused of being "both too ambitious and not ambitious enough", that, in order to maintain traction, it ought to concentrate on just one issue, e.g., quotas in the boardroom.

Heather Brunskell-Evans, the former spokeswoman for the party on violence against women and a research fellow at King's College London, was criticised in 2017 for expressing viewpoints on transgender children. Speaking on The Moral Maze on BBC Radio 4 in 2017, she argued that transgender adults should be free to define themselves as they wish, but questioned whether positive affirmation was the only way to help children expressing confusion about their gender. Brunskell-Evans said that "If a child decides that it's an astronaut, one can play along with this. One doesn't have to moralise about it but quite clearly the child is not an astronaut. In fact it's incumbent upon adults who are responsible for the welfare, psychological and social and medical, of children not to go along with this story", and stated her belief that recognising gender incongruence was "imposing", "abusive", and "imposing restrictions on children". Subsequently, she withdrew from a King's event after protests by students, and three transgender members complained to the party that she was "promoting prejudice against the transgender community". Brunskell-Evans was investigated by the party and subsequently resigned.

== Electoral performance ==
=== General elections ===
Year	Candidates	Total votes	% of total vote	Change	Average vote	Average % vote	Saved Deposits	Number of MPs	Change
2017	7	3,580	0.01%	n/a	511	0.9%	0	0	Steady
2019	3	416	0.0%	n/a	139	0.3%	0	0	Steady
2024	4	1,275	0.0%	n/a	319	0.6%	0	0	Steady

=== London Mayoral elections ===
Date	Popular Vote	% of Vote	Change	Place	Notes
2016	53,055	2.0%	n/a	6th	
2021	21,182	0.8%	n/a	10th	
2024	Did not contest				

=== London Assembly elections ===
Date	Regional Vote	% of Vote	Change	AMs	Change
2016	91,772	3.5%	n/a	0	Steady
2021	55,684	2.2%	n/a	0	Steady
2024	Did not contest				

=== National Assembly for Wales elections ===
Date	Regional Vote	% of Vote	Change	AMs	Change
2016	2,807	0.3%	n/a	0	Steady

=== Scottish Parliament elections ===
Date	Regional Vote	% of Vote	Change	MSPs	Change
2016	5,968	0.3%	n/a	0	Steady
2021	1,896	0.07%	n/a	0	Steady

== See also ==
- Feminism in the United Kingdom
- Party of Women

== Notes ==
^{Note 1}
- Janet Baker, Brixton Hill ward, Lambeth · Ann Butler, Walkley ward, Sheffield · Diane Coffey, Heatons North ward, Stockport · Cat Crossley, Baildon ward, Bradford · Claire Empson, Goose Green ward, Southwark · Leila Fazal, Ferndale ward, Lambeth · Bea Gare, Duryard & St James ward, Exeter · Tulip Hambleton, Town ward, Enfield · Jo Heathcote, Chorlton ward, Manchester · Eleanor Hemmens, Prince's ward, Lambeth · Harini Iyengar, Mayor of Hackney (and also Dalston ward, Hackney) · Louise Jennings, Headingley and Hyde Park ward, Leeds · Sam Johnson, Deansgate ward, Manchester · Emma Ko, Queens Park ward, Brent · Jean Laight, St. Georges ward, Harrogate · Jessie Macneil-Brown, Bethnal Green ward, Tower Hamlets · Alison Marshall, Highbury West ward, Islington · Caroline MacVay, Plaistow and Sundridge ward, Bromley · Rebecca Manson Jones, Ladywell ward, Lewisham · Liz Orr, Culverden ward, Tunbridge Wells · Caroline Rayfield, Twickenham Riverside ward, Richmond · Mandu Reid, Lewisham Central ward, Lewisham · Pamela Richie, Charlton ward, Greenwich · Eileen Scholes, Borough & Bankside ward, Southwark · Helen Shay, Stray ward, Harrogate · Amanda Shribman, West Finchley ward, Barnet · Leisa Taylor, Bedwardine ward, Worcester · Wendy Thomson, Peppard ward, Reading · Nikki Uppal, Hillrise ward, Islington · Kate Vang, Brockley ward, Lewisham

^{Note 2}
- Nicke Adebowale, Evelyn ward (by-election), Lewisham · Hannah Barham-Brown, Roundhay ward, Leeds · Beverly Barstow, Hanover and Elm Grove ward, Brighton and Hove · Vinice Bridget Cowell, Chalkwell ward, Southend-on-Sea · Priya Brown, Eastrop ward, Basingstoke and Deane · Jen Bryan, Heatons North ward, Stockport · Samantha Days, Crumpsall ward, Manchester · Sally Duffin, Heworth ward, York · Bea Gare, Duryard & St. James ward, Exeter · Amy Gooding, Walkley ward, Sheffield · Cairis Grant-Hickey, Whitefoot ward (by-election), Lewisham · Jo Heathcote, Chorlton ward, Manchester · Caroline Hunt, Headingley & Hyde Park ward, Leeds · Louise Jennings, Alwoodley ward, Leeds · Sam Johnson, Deansgate ward, Manchester · Jessie MacNeil-Brown, Central Hove ward, Brighton and Hove · Liz Orr, Culverden ward, Tunbridge Wells · Sarika Paul, Didsbury West ward, Manchester · Erika Raffle-Currie, Childwall ward, Liverpool · Kanndiss Riley, Cliftonville East ward, Thanet · Megan Senior, Ecclesall ward, Sheffield · Leisa Taylor, Bedwardine ward, Worcester · Celine Thomas, Pantiles & St Mark's ward, Tunbridge Wells · Louise Timlin, Evendons ward, Wokingham · Kay Wesley, Congleton East ward, Cheshire East (and Kay Wesley, Congleton Town Council) · Jane Whild, Campbell Park & Old Woughton ward, Milton Keynes · Annie Wood, Eccles ward, Salford

^{Note 3}

- Stacy Hart, Hatch Warren and Beggarwood Ward, Basingstoke and Deane · Paula King, Reddish North, Stockport · Diane Coffey, Heatons North ward, Stockport · Samantha Days, Crumpsall ward, Manchester · Hattie Thomas, Mossley ward, Tameside and Hattie Thomas, Mossley Parish, Cheshire · Sharon Richards, Manor ward, Trafford · Louise Timlin, Evendons West ward, Wokingham and Louise Timlin, Evendons ward, Wokingham Borough · Susan Mead, Congleton North East Ward, Congleton Town Council · Kay Wesley, Congleton East ward, Cheshire East and Kay Wesley, South East Ward, Congleton Town Council) · Jane Whild, Newport Pagnell North and Hanslope, Milton Keynes · Donna-Maree Humphery, Weaste and Seedley, Salford

- Average vote per candidate.
