= Namibia Women's Action for Equality Party =

Former political party in Namibia

Namibia Women's Action for Equality Party was a political party in Namibia. It was formed on 20 July 1994 by Ilenikelao Nhinda Latvio. The party never gained many members and never took part in an election.
