= City and East (London Assembly constituency) =

- Territorial constituency for the London Assembly
- City and East shown within London
- Created: 2000
- Number of members: One
- Member: Unmesh Desai
- Party: Labour
- Last election: 2024
- Next election: 2028

City and East is a constituency represented in the London Assembly. Created in 2000 it is represented by Unmesh Desai, of the Labour Party.

== Boundaries ==
It consists of the combined area of the London Borough of Barking and Dagenham, the City of London, the London Borough of Newham, and the London Borough of Tower Hamlets.

== Overlapping constituencies ==
The City and East Assembly constituency comprises all of the following UK Parliament constituencies:

- Barking (Labour)
- Bethnal Green and Bow (Labour)
- East Ham (Labour)
- Poplar and Limehouse (Labour)
- West Ham (Labour)

It also includes parts of the following constituencies:

- Cities of London and Westminster (Labour)
- Dagenham and Rainham (Labour)
- Ilford South (Labour)

== Assembly members ==
Year	Member	Party
2000	John Biggs	Labour
2016	Unmesh Desai	Labour

== Assembly election results ==
=== 2024 ===
2024 London Assembly election: City and East
Party	Candidate	Constituency			List		
Party	Candidate	Votes	%	±%	Votes	%	±%
Labour	Unmesh Desai	99,570	51.4	▼5.3	97,432	50.2	
Conservative	Freddie Downing	29,083	15.0	▼6.2	28,344	14.6	
Green	Joe Hudson-Small	29,073	15.0	▲3.4	24,912	12.8	
Reform	David Sandground	14,535	7.5	▲3.4	10,899	5.6	
Liberal Democrats	Pat Stillman	11,416	5.9	▼0.5	9,620	5.0	
Rejoin EU					5,384	2.8	
Independent	Ak Goodman	5,310	2.7	New			
TUSC	Lois Austin	4,710	2.4	New			
Independent	Farah London				3,490	1.8	
Animal Welfare					3,423	1.8	
Britain First					3,104	1.6	
CPA					2,666	1.4	
SDP					2,000	1.0	
Communist					1,063	0.5	
Independent	Laurence Fox				1,006	0.5	
Independent	Gabe Romualdo				372	0.2	
Heritage					366	0.2	
Majority		70,487	36.4	▲0.9			
Valid votes		193,697			194,051		
Invalid votes		2,153			1,818		
Turnout		195,850	31.1		195,869	31.1	
Labour hold		Swing		▼0.5			

=== 2021 ===
2021 London Assembly election: City and East
Party	Candidate	Constituency			List		
Party	Candidate	Votes	%	±%	Votes	%	±%
Labour	Unmesh Desai (Note: Incumbent member for this constituency)	125,025	56.7	▼1.1	116,148	53.32	▼4.29
Conservative	Nick Vandyke	46,718	21.2	▲5.8	44,957	20.64	▲6.26
Green	Tim Kiely	25,596	11.6	▲2.7	20,106	9.23	▲2.54
Liberal Democrats	Richard Flowers	14,136	6.4	▲1.4	9,001	4.13	▲0.44
Rejoin EU					4,724	2.17	New
Animal Welfare					3,651	1.68	▲0.86
Women's Equality					3,431	1.58	▼1.12
CPA					2,992	1.37	▲0.11
UKIP					2,734	1.26	▼5.42
Reform	David Bull	9,060	4.1	New	2,459	1.13	New
London Real					2,189	1.00	New
Let London Live					1,649	0.76	New
Heritage					986	0.45	New
Londependence Party					850	0.39	New
Communist					849	0.39	New
TUSC					950	0.43	New
SDP					691	0.32	New
National Liberal					395	0.18	New
Majority		78,307	35.5	▼6.9			
Turnout		220,535					
Labour hold		Swing					

=== 2016 ===
2016 London Assembly election: City and East
Party	Candidate	Constituency			List		
Party	Candidate	Votes	%	±%	Votes	%	±%
Labour	Unmesh Desai	122,175	57.8	-5.2	121,871	57.61	
Conservative	Chris Chapman	32,546	15.4	+0.8	30,424	14.38	
Green	Rachel Collinson	18,766	8.9	+2.5	14,151	6.69	
UKIP	Peter Harris	18,071	8.6	+5.5	14,123	6.68	
Liberal Democrats	Elaine Bagshaw	10,714	5.0	+0.8	7,799	3.69	
Respect	Mikail Rayne	6,722	3.2	New	6,784	3.21	
Women's Equality					5,718	2.70	
Britain First					3,591	1.70	
CPA					2,660	1.26	
BNP					1,828	0.86	
Animal Welfare					1,738	0.82	
Take Back The City	Amina Gichinga	1,368	0.7	New	N/A		
All People's Party	Aaron D'Souza	1,009	0.5	New	N/A		
The House Party					858	0.41	
Majority		89,629	42.4	−6.0			
Total formal votes		211,421	98.5	+0.4			
Informal votes		3,203	1.5	−0.4			
Majority		89,629	42.4	−6.0			
Turnout		214,624	43.0	+8.2			
Labour hold		Swing					

=== 2012 ===
2012 London Assembly election: City and East
Party	Candidate	Votes	%	±%
Labour	John Biggs	107,667	62.97	+28.27
Conservative	John Moss	24,923	14.57	−2.91
Green	Chris Smith	10,891	6.4	+0.1
Liberal Democrats	Richard Macmillan	7,351	4.3	−3.2
BNP	Paul Borg	7,031	4.1	−5.7
Communities United	Kamran Malik	6,774	4.0	New
UKIP	Steven Woolfe	5,243	3.1	+1.4
Communist League	Paul Davies	1,108	0.6	+0.23
Majority		82,744	48.4	+31.0
Total formal votes		170,988	98.1	
Informal votes		3,293	1.9	
Majority		82,744	48.40	
Turnout		174,281	34.8	
Labour hold		Swing		

=== 2008 ===
2008 London Assembly election: City and East
Party	Candidate	Votes	%	±%
Labour	John Biggs	63,635	34.69	+8.64
Conservative	Phil Briscoe	32,082	17.49	+1.25
Respect	Hanif Abdulmuhit	26,760	14.59	+1.13
BNP	Bob Bailey	18,020	9.82	New
Liberal Democrats	Rajonuddin Jalal	13,724	7.48	–5.01
Green	Heather Finlay	11,478	6.26	+0.32
Christian (CPA)	Thomas Conquest	7,306	3.98	+0.93
UKIP	Michael McGough	3,078	1.68	–10.63
National Front	Graham Kemp	2,350	1.28	New
Left List	Michael Gavan	2,274	1.24	New
English Democrat	John Griffiths	2,048	1.12	New
Communist League	Julie Crawford	701	0.37	New
Majority		31,553	17.20	+6.2
Turnout		183,456		
Labour hold		Swing		

=== 2004 ===
2004 London Assembly election: City and East
Party	Candidate	Votes	%	±%
Labour	John Biggs	38,085	29.1	–16.8
Conservative	Dr Shafi Choudhury	23,749	18.1	–1.4
Respect	Oliur Rahman	19,675	15.0	New
Liberal Democrats	Guy Burton	18,255	13.9	–4.6
UKIP	Christopher Pratt	17,997	13.8	New
Green	Terry McGrenera	8,687	6.6	–5.5
CPA	Christopher Gill	4,461	3.4	New
Majority		14,336	11.0	–15.4
Turnout		130,909	30.0	+5.3
Labour hold		Swing		

=== 2000 ===
2000 London Assembly election: City and East
Party	Candidate	Votes	%	±%
Labour	John Biggs	45,387	45.9	N/A
Conservative	Syed Kamall	19,266	19.5	N/A
Liberal Democrats	Janet Ludlow	18,300	18.5	N/A
Green	Peter Howell	11,939	12.1	N/A
London Socialist	Kambiz Boomla	3,908	4.0	N/A
Majority		26,121	26.4	N/A
Turnout		98,800	24.7	N/A
Labour win (new seat)				

== Mayoral election results ==
Below are the results for the candidate which received the highest share of the popular vote in the constituency at each mayoral election.

Year	Party	Candidate
2000	Independent	Ken Livingstone
2004	Labour	Ken Livingstone
2008	Labour	Ken Livingstone
2012	Labour	Ken Livingstone
2016	Labour	Sadiq Khan
2021	Labour	Sadiq Khan
2024	Labour	Sadiq Khan

2024 London mayoral election (City and East)
Party	Candidate	Votes	%	±%
Labour	Sadiq Khan	108,977	55.9	N/A
Conservative	Susan Hall	38,626	19.8	N/A
Green	Zoë Garbett	13,256	6.8	N/A
Liberal Democrats	Rob Blackie	7,551	3.88	N/A
Reform	Howard Cox	6,898	3.54	N/A
Independent	Natalie Campbell	4,149	2.13	N/A
Independent	Tarun Ghulati	2,692	1.38	N/A
SDP	Amy Gallagher	2,686	1.38	N/A
Animal Welfare	Femy Amin	2,671	1.37	N/A
Independent	Andreas Michli	2,473	1.27	N/A
Britain First	Nick Scanlon	2,019	1.04	N/A
Count Binface for Mayor of London	Count Binface	1,918	0.984	N/A
London Real	Brian Rose	924	0.474	N/A
Turnout		195,981	31.2%	−4.21%
Rejected ballots		2,153		
Registered electors		628,856		−1.33%

2021 London mayoral election (City and East)
Party	Candidate	1st round		2nd round			1st round votesTransfer votes, 2nd round
Party	Candidate	Total	Of round	Transfers	Total	Of round	1st round votesTransfer votes, 2nd round
Labour	Sadiq Khan	99,971	47.5%				
Conservative	Shaun Bailey	58,145	27.6%				
Green	Siân Berry	13,616	6.47%				
Independent	Niko Omilana	7,920	3.77%				
Liberal Democrats	Luisa Porritt	5,906	2.81%				
London Real	Brian Rose	3,613	1.72%				
Reclaim	Laurence Fox	3,174	1.51%				
Rejoin EU	Richard Hewison	2,718	1.29%				
Let London Live	Piers Corbyn	2,242	1.07%				
Count Binface for Mayor of London	Count Binface	1,968	0.936%				
Animal Welfare	Vanessa Hudson	1,773	0.843%				
UKIP	Peter John Gammons	1,589	0.756%				
Independent	Farah London	1,515	0.72%				
Women's Equality	Mandu Reid	1,420	0.675%				
Independent	Nims Obunge	1,004	0.477%				
Heritage	David Kurten	939	0.447%				
Renew	Kam Balayev	826	0.393%				
SDP	Steve Kelleher	812	0.386%				
Independent	Max Fosh	601	0.286%				
Burning Pink	Valerie Brown	542	0.258%				
Turnout		225,461	35.4%				
Registered electors		637,319					

2016 London mayoral election (City and East)
Party	Candidate	1st round		2nd round			1st round votesTransfer votes, 2nd round
Party	Candidate	Total	Of round	Transfers	Total	Of round	1st round votesTransfer votes, 2nd round
Labour	Sadiq Khan	125,908	60.2%				
Conservative	Zac Goldsmith	40,194	19.2%				
Green	Siân Berry	11,025	5.27%				
UKIP	Peter Whittle	8,931	4.27%				
Liberal Democrats	Caroline Pidgeon	6,039	2.89%				
Respect	George Galloway	5,474	2.62%				
Women's Equality	Sophie Walker	3,734	1.78%				
Britain First	Paul Golding	3,183	1.52%				
Cannabis is Safer than Alcohol	Lee Eli Harris	1,928	0.921%				
BNP	David Furness	1,630	0.779%				
Independent	Prince Zylinski	745	0.356%				
One Love	Ankit Love	475	0.227%				
Turnout		214,748	42.6%				
Registered electors		504,379					

2012 London mayoral election (City and East)
Party	Candidate	1st round		2nd round			1st round votesTransfer votes, 2nd round
Party	Candidate	Total	Of round	Transfers	Total	Of round	1st round votesTransfer votes, 2nd round
Labour	Ken Livingstone	106,149	62.6%				
Conservative	Boris Johnson	42,704	25.2%				
Green	Jenny Jones	5,926	3.49%				
Independent	Siobhan Benita	4,682	2.76%				
Liberal Democrats	Brian Paddick	4,548	2.68%				
BNP	Carlos Cortiglia	3,330	1.96%				
UKIP	Lawrence Webb	2,231	1.32%				
Turnout		174,367	34.8%				
Registered electors		500,527					

2008 London mayoral election (City and East)
Party	Candidate	1st round		2nd round			1st round votesTransfer votes, 2nd round
Party	Candidate	Total	Of round	Transfers	Total	Of round	1st round votesTransfer votes, 2nd round
Labour	Ken Livingstone	94,921	52%				
Conservative	Boris Johnson	49,666	27.2%				
Liberal Democrats	Brian Paddick	12,724	6.97%				
BNP	Richard Barnbrook	10,214	5.6%				
Christian Choice	Alan Craig	4,906	2.69%				
Green	Siân Berry	4,817	2.64%				
UKIP	Gerard Batten	1,916	1.05%				
Left List	Lindsey German	1,851	1.01%				
English Democrat	Matt O'Connor	882	0.483%				
Independent	Winston McKenzie	566	0.31%				
Turnout		187,568	39.8%				
Registered electors		470,863					

2004 London mayoral election (City and East)
Party	Candidate	1st round		2nd round			1st round votesTransfer votes, 2nd round
Party	Candidate	Total	Of round	Transfers	Total	Of round	1st round votesTransfer votes, 2nd round
Labour	Ken Livingstone	51,842	37.4%				
Conservative	Steve Norris	25,503	18.4%				
Respect	Lindsey German	17,585	12.7%				
Liberal Democrats	Simon Hughes	16,426	11.8%				
UKIP	Frank Maloney	10,086	7.27%				
BNP	Julian Leppert	7,766	5.6%				
CPA	Ram Gidoomal	4,154	2.99%				
Green	Darren Johnson	3,934	2.84%				
Independent Working Class Action	Lorna Reid	912	0.657%				
Independent	Tammy Nagalingam	552	0.398%				
Turnout		146,081	33.4%				
Registered electors		437,309					

2000 London mayoral election (City and East)
Party	Candidate	1st round		2nd round			1st round votesTransfer votes, 2nd round
Party	Candidate	Total	Of round	Transfers	Total	Of round	1st round votesTransfer votes, 2nd round
Independent	Ken Livingstone	46,236	40.6%				
Labour	Frank Dobson	24,382	21.4%				
Conservative	Steve Norris	19,025	16.7%				
Liberal Democrats	Susan Kramer	9,919	8.7%				
BNP	Michael Newland	5,081	4.46%				
CPA	Ram Gidoomal	3,009	2.64%				
Green	Darren Johnson	2,383	2.09%				
UKIP	Damian Hockney	1,264	1.11%				
Pro-Motorist Small Shop	Geoffrey Ben-Nathan	1,123	0.985%				
Natural Law	Geoffrey Clements	816	0.716%				
Independent	Ashwin Kumar	783	0.687%				
Turnout		118,466	29.6%				
Registered electors		400,139					
