= Belu (company) =

British drinks company

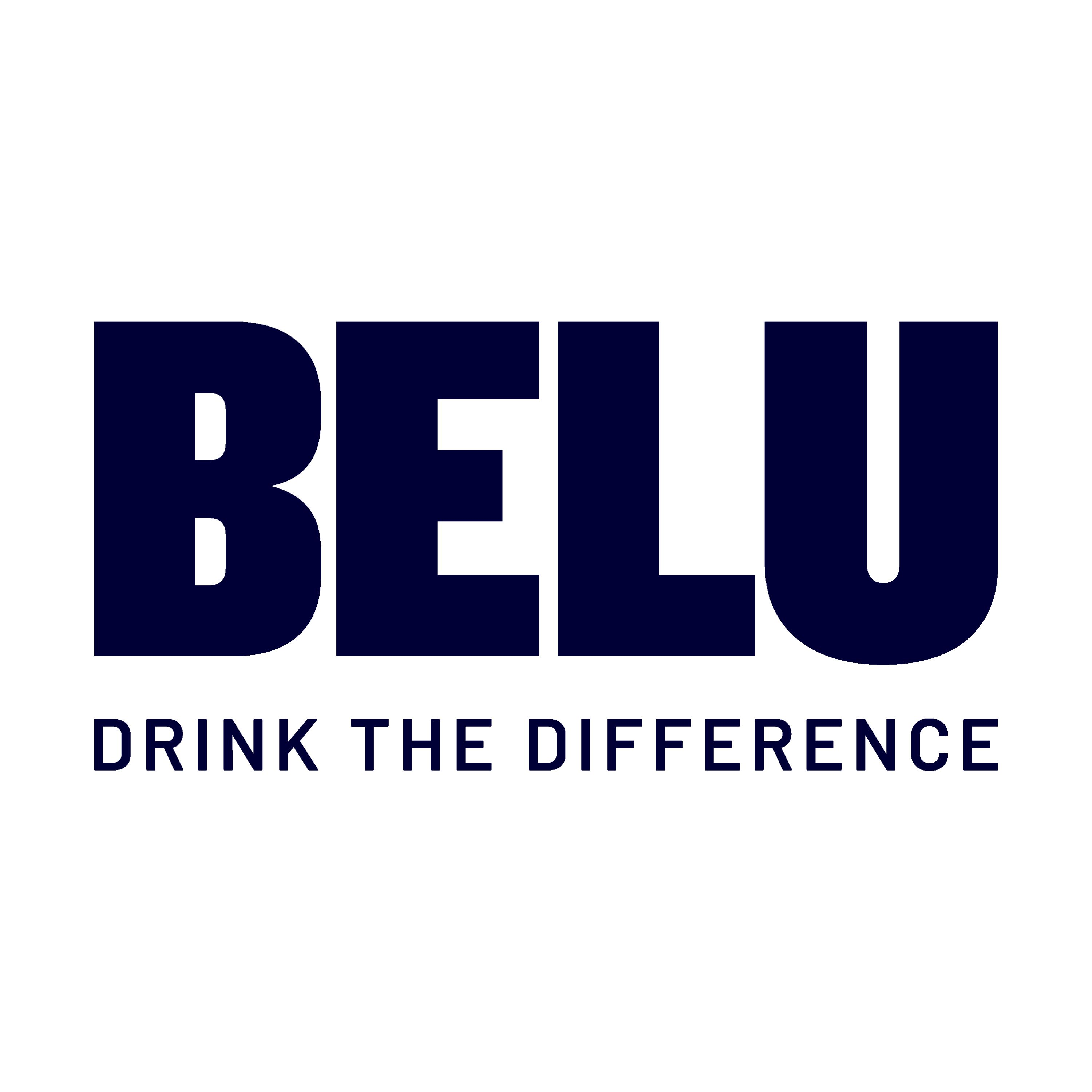
- Belu Logo

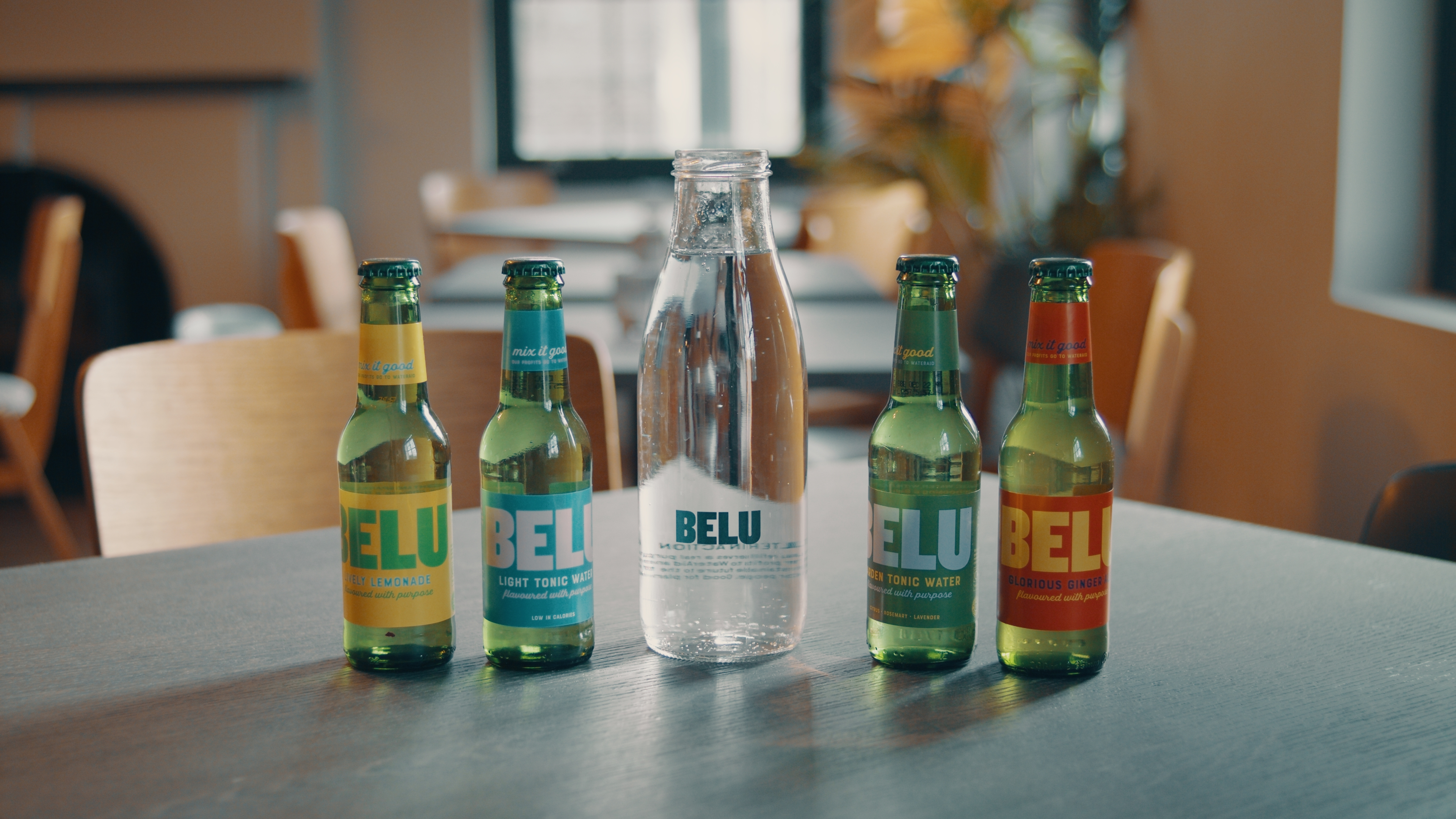
- Selection of Belu drinks
- Type: Social Enterprise
- Industry: Water Filtration, Water/Drinks
- Founded: 2002
- Founder: Reed Paget
- Headquarters: London
- Area served: UK, France, Hong Kong
- Key people: Natalie Campbell (Co-CEO), Charlotte Harrington (Co-CEO)
- Products: Water Filtration Machines, Mineral Water, Tonics and Mixers
- Revenue: £7.1m (2023)
- Number of employees: 24 (As of Feb 2024)
- Website: www.belu.org

Belu is a U.K social enterprise, drinks and water filtration company. The company, which is based in London, supplies mineral water, tonic water, a range of flavoured mixers and filtration systems. Its mission statement is to change the way people see and consume water and commit to giving 100% of net profits to WaterAid. They also work towards providing mineral water that is not deprived of critical electrolytes, minerals, and other nutrients.

== History ==
Belu was founded in 2002 by film-maker Reed Paget as a bottled water business to be an environmentally friendlier alternative to other beverages on the market. Before launching Belu, Paget was a keen environmentalist in business communities, encouraging others in the drinks industry to consider the environmental impact of sourcing, manufacturing, and packaging. Early stage investors in Belu included Body Shop co-founder Gordon Roddick, environmentalist Ben Goldsmith and hedge fund manager, Chris Cooper-Hohn.

Paget launched the UK's first compostable plastic bottle in 2006.

In 2007 Belu was officially launched as an environmental social enterprise. Paget appointed Karen Lynch, previously Barclays Branch Marketing Manager, as a new MD in 2010. Karen Lynch secured a national network of customers, making Belu a respected name in the hospitality industry.

In 2010 new manufacturing and distribution processes reduced Belu's carbon emissions’ by a further 22%.

Lynch expanded the company distribution model to include wholesale, and in 2011, she re-launched the Belu brand

In 2011, Lynch employed the design agency This is Real Art to create a new bottle design as part of the brand refresh.

In 2017 Belu Filter in Action becomes more popular in the food service sector and Belu wins the Food Made Good Product of the Year award.

In March 2020, Lynch stepped down as CEO and was replaced by Natalie Campbell MBE, three weeks before the global pandemic. In September 2020 – Charlotte Harrington (then COO) joined her as Co-CEO to scale filtration and take Belu to new territories outside of the UK.

Belu partnered with Ocean Bottle and launched a reusable bottle in October 2020. Ocean Bottle partners with Plastic Bank, which works with collectors in coastal communities with high levels of plastic pollution. Every Belu Ocean Bottle sold funds the collection of 11.4 kg of plastic, equivalent to stopping 1000 bottles from entering our oceans.

In 2021, Belu launched a range of flavoured mixers and tonic waters. During the same year, it launched its first overseas filtration operations in Hong Kong. During 2021 Belu also changed its Articles to align with the UN SDGs and shared a new 10-year purpose: to change the way the world sees water.

In 2021 Belu made the decision to move away from opaque carbon offsetting initiatives and instead chose to redirect funding to invest in nature-based solutions in and around the UK, starting with their mineral water source in Montgomeryshire, Wales. Belu partners with a number of organisations to invest in projects that benefits initiatives that fall in line with the Sustainable Development Goals 6,12,13,14 and 17. These organisations include WaterAid, Thames21, The Rivers Trust, the Blue Marine Foundation and WRAP.

Belu does not operate as a Bcorp and is not carbon neutral but rather Belu follows PAS 808 principles and practices to foster stakeholder alignment across our partners and the Belu Collective as a whole.

In 2022 and 2023 Belu was certified a Great Place to Work scoring 100% across several key areas, including leadership satisfaction, support and impartiality.

Belu has given £6.5 million of its profits to WaterAid since 2011. Belu has a partnership with WaterAid and has an agreement in place to give 100% of its profits to WaterAid. In 2012, Belu was part of the arc initiative. It is also a member of Social Enterprise UK.

According to their website 108,780,406 bottles have been made into new Belu bottles using recycled materials and supporting a circular economy model. They also claim to have achieved a 69% reduction in the carbon intensity of their business since 2010.

== Products ==
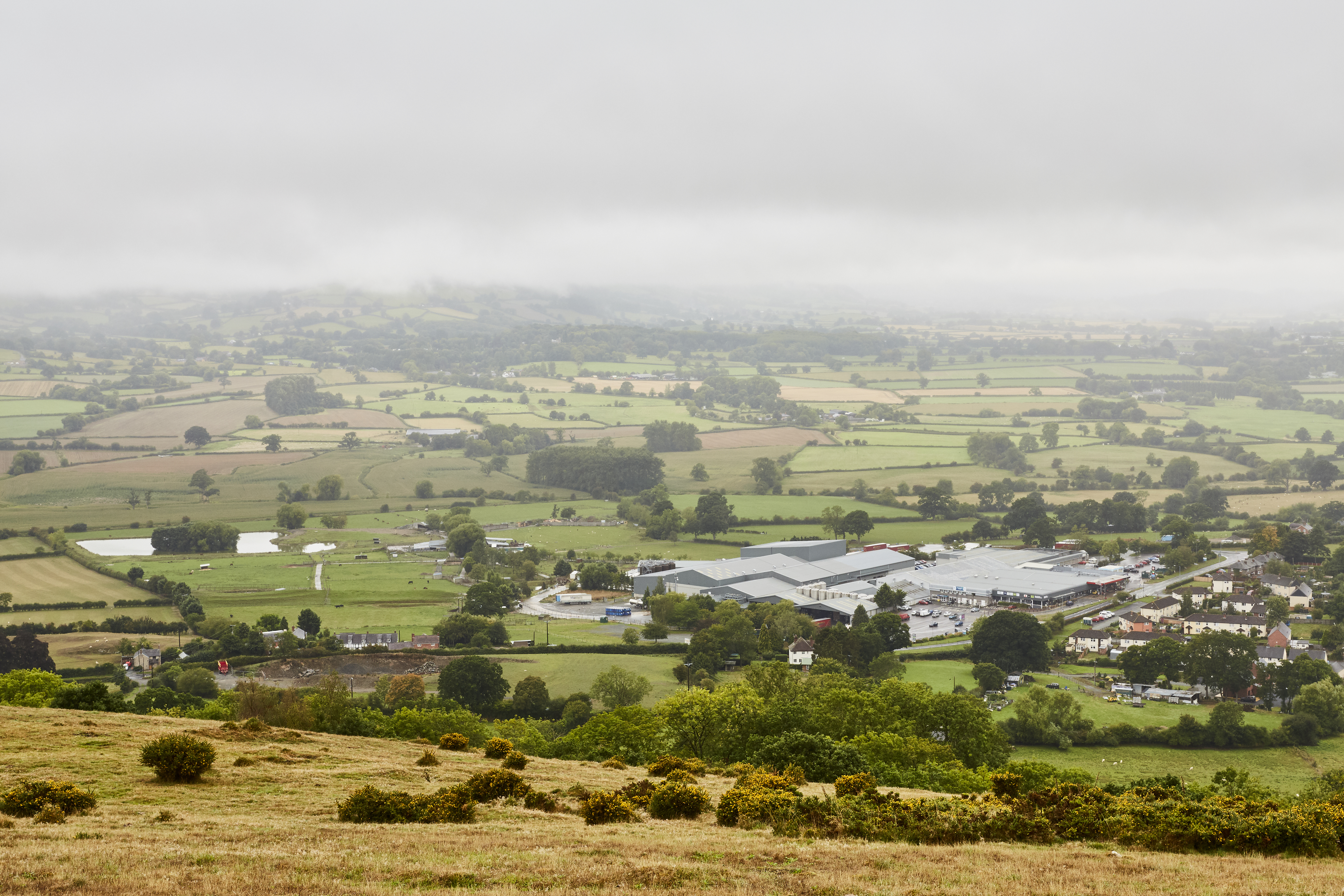
Belu source, Churchstoke, Powys

Belu provide a range of products including mineral water, filtration systems and tonics and mixers. Their mineral water is drawn directly from a dedicated source in the hills of mid-Wales, infused with essential minerals by its passage through ancient volcanic rock formations.

The glass used in the mineral water bottles are made in the UK, from lightweight clear glass using a minimum of 35% recycled content. The bottles are also 100% recyclable. The glass bottles are available in still and sparkling natural mineral water in 330ml, 500ml, 750ml and 1 Litre UK-made glass.

Belu also have a recycled plastic bottle (RPET) which is lightweight and crushable and made from 100% recycled material and are 100% recyclable.

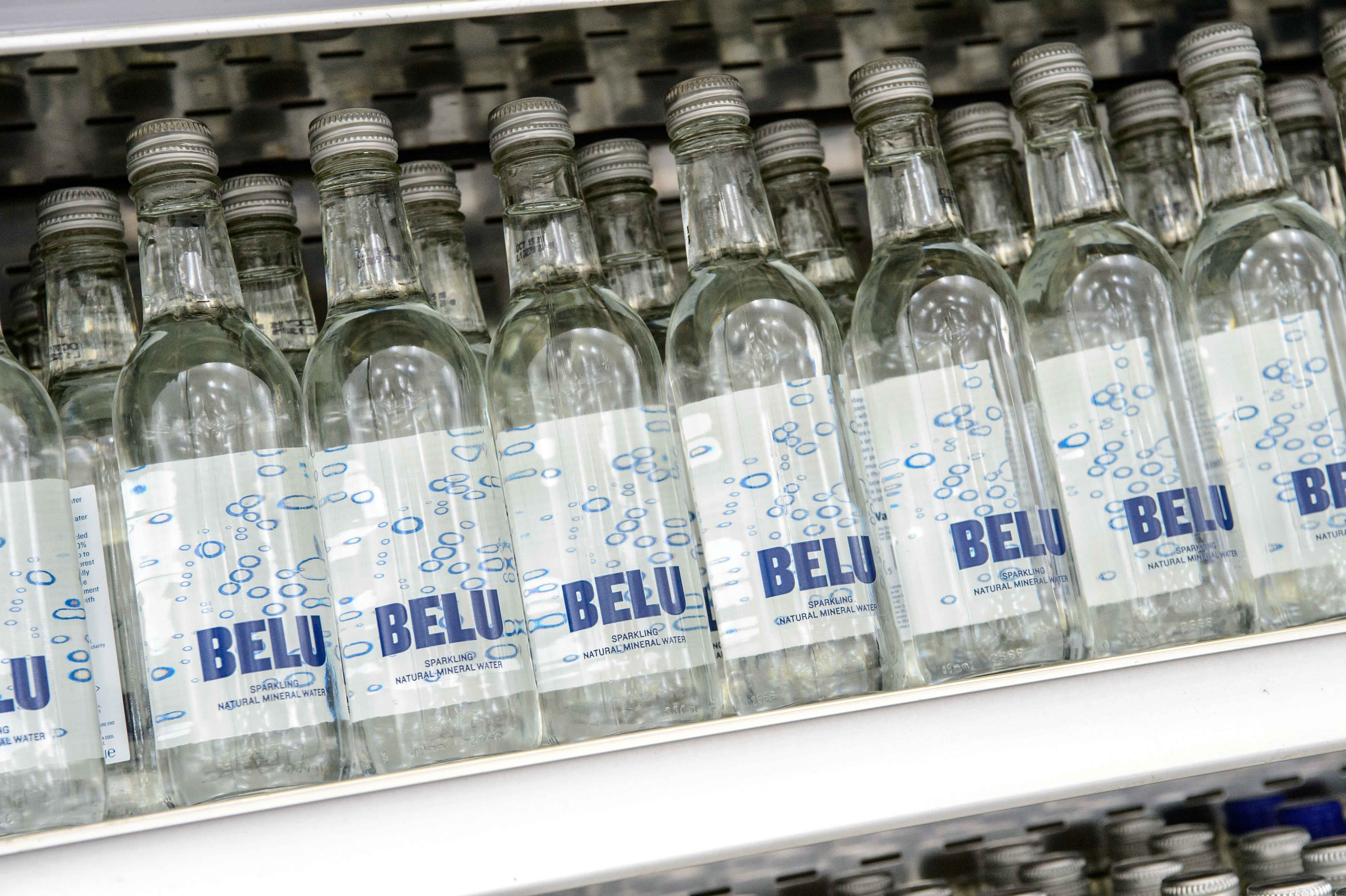
Belu Mineral water

Belu also source, bottle and distribute their mineral water solely within the UK to minimise their carbon footprint.

Belu also provide filtration systems for hospitality businesses and workplaces. They provide a range of machines and choice of payment models and can supply refillable bottles, add branding and will maintain systems with regular servicing and call-out.

In 2021 Belu also created a new range of tonics and mixers in green glass, making it the only tonic or mixer brand to use over 70% recycled material in its bottles. The new range included three varieties of tonic water - Classic, Light and Garden - as well as a Fiery Ginger Beer, Glorious Ginger Ale, Lively Lemonade and Sunny Soda Water.
