= Daniel Korski =

Danish-British political adviser and businessperson

Daniel Korski CBE
- Born: April 1977 (age 49); Copenhagen, Denmark
- Education: London School of Economics; University of Cambridge
- Political party: Conservative
- Spouse: Fiona Mcilwham

Daniel Korski CBE (born April 1977) is a UK-based Danish political adviser and businessperson. He worked as deputy head of the Number 10 Policy Unit for David Cameron and served as a vice-president of the Jewish Leadership Council. He founded the business PUBLIC, which aims to support technology companies to secure public sector contracts.

== Early life and career ==
Daniel Korski was born in Denmark in 1977. His mother was among Jewish people expelled from Poland during the 1968 Polish political crisis.

Korski moved to the United Kingdom in 1997. He graduated from the London School of Economics in 2000 and the University of Cambridge in 2001.

Korski reported for The Spectator as a war correspondent in Libya. In 2008, he was described as a "Balkans expert" working at the European Council on Foreign Relations (ECFR), a think tank. In 2011, he was working as a senior policy fellow for the ECFR and running the Middle East programme there. In 2012, he was appointed as a strategic adviser to Catherine Ashton, then working as High Representative of the European Union for Foreign Affairs and Security Policy.

== Political and business career ==
Korski worked as an adviser to the Conservative MP Andrew Mitchell. He later served as deputy head of the Number 10 Policy Unit for the Conservative prime minister David Cameron from 2013 to 2016. In 2013, his proposal to charge foreign students to attend state schools in the UK was rejected after criticism by government departments and the Liberal Democrats. In 2015, he was criticised for putting pressure on the Greater London Authority over proposed restrictions to Uber, with Korski and Cameron opposed to proposed regulations that would limit the company. He described proposed restrictions as "insane and luddite". He met with Uber executives on several occasions, at 10 Downing Street, at their headquarters in California and at a private dinner. His behaviour was described as lobbying for the company, a charge Korski denied. The Information Commissioner's Office investigated why 10 Downing Street had denied that Korski's correspondence with City Hall existed.

Also in 2015, Korski developed proposals to end the use of cash in the UK by 2020 "to drive up productivity and disrupt some forms of criminal activity", which the chancellor of the Exchequer George Osborne rejected.

During the 2016 United Kingdom European Union membership referendum, Korski helped run the Stronger in campaign supporting the UK remaining in the European Union. He met European diplomats and told them to "think twice" before criticising the 2015–2016 United Kingdom renegotiation of European Union membership. Korski texted and called John Longworth, the chair of the British Chambers of Commerce (BCC), and then spoke to the president of the BCC, shortly before Longworth was suspended from his role as chair of the BCC for supporting the UK leaving the EU. Korski was accused by the anti-EU politician Bernard Jenkin of breaking the code of conduct for special advisers over tweets in support of remaining in the European Union. He "left frontline politics" in 2016.

In 2017, Korski started the business Public.io (later branded PUBLIC), which supported technology companies to work with UK public services. He said the business would provide support and advice about the public sector but not engage in lobbying. The model required companies to give a 3% equity share. He advertised connection to "GovStart speakers" including special advisers to ministers, some of whom were removed from listings after BuzzFeed News made inquiries about Cabinet Office clearance. Initially, he selected ten companies and projects to "explore which public services to target and build up contacts in the relevant areas" for six months. He presented the ideas of these companies at 10 Downing Street. In 2018, he chaired a conference about technology in government, "GovTech", which was attended by world leaders.

In 2019, Korski was appointed to a panel advising the trade secretary Liz Truss about freeport proposals. He worked on the Tom Tugendhat July–September 2022 Conservative Party leadership election campaign. Korski applied to be the Conservative Party's candidate in the 2024 London mayoral election. He proposed implementing a levy on hotel stays to fund new police programmes and supported road pricing as an alternative to expansion of London's Ultra Low Emission Zone. He withdrew from the selection procedure after the television producer Daisy Goodwin accused him of having groped her while working at 10 Downing Street. He resigned as chief executive of PUBLIC in August 2023 while remaining a director and major shareholder.

In 2025, Korski joined the Ukrainian govtech company Kitsoft as a member of the Supervisory Board.

== Personal life ==
Korski is married to Fiona Mcilwham, who served as ambassador to Albania from 2009 to 2012 and was appointed as private secretary to Prince Harry and Meghan, Duchess of Sussex in 2019. Korski served as one of twenty vice presidents of the Jewish Leadership Council. He resigned as a vice president of the Jewish Leadership Council in July 2023. He was appointed a Commander of the Order of British Empire (CBE) in 2016 as part of David Cameron's Resignation Honours, for "political and public service."

Korski speaks fluent Danish, English and Swedish.

== Assault allegation ==
On 26 June 2023, The Times published an article by senior British television producer Daisy Goodwin who accused Korski of groping her breasts during a meeting Korski had invited her to attend at 10 Downing Street, and comparing her to a Bond girl. The alleged incident occurred in the Thatcher Drawing Room where the pair had just finished discussing Goodwin's proposal to make a TV documentary about the Cameron government's work to support British businesses in the export market. Explaining that she never felt in fear of Korski, she said of the incident, "I suppose [it] could legally be called sexual assault".

While The Daily Telegraph had previously named Korski in a 2017 article relating to the widely discussed allegation, Goodwin had never publicly identified a perpetrator. The Telegraph reported Korski denying the allegation and saying: "I am shocked to find this is in any way connected to me. I met with Mrs Goodwin in No 10 twice I think, and she may have met others too. But I categorically deny any allegation of inappropriate behaviour. Any such allegation would not only be totally false but also totally bizarre."

Goodwin stated that she was naming Korski in The Times article because of her feelings of anger on learning weeks earlier that Korski had put himself forward as a Conservative Party candidate for the 2024 election race for Mayor of London. "If there are other women who have had similar experiences with him I hope this article will encourage them to come forward," wrote Goodwin. "Because if this is a pattern of behaviour then the people of London deserve to know ... I write not out of revenge but to send out a signal to him, and to all men who mistreat women. Don't think that you will get away with it."

On 28 June 2023, Daisy Goodwin filed an official complaint to the cabinet office about Korski's alleged behaviour. Korski withdrew his candidacy for the mayor of London election that same afternoon.

In August 2023, three further women made allegations of sexual misconduct against Korski to the Financial Times newspaper. One of the alleged victims was a senior government official.
