= Natalie Campbell (social entrepreneur) =

British social entrepreneur

Natalie Campbell is a British social entrepreneur, broadcaster and campaigner based in London. She has been the Co-CEO of Belu Water since 2020 and Chancellor of the University of Westminster since 2022. Campbell was an independent candidate for the 2024 London mayoral election.

== Early life and education ==
Natalie Campbell was born in Hammersmith and was raised in Willesden Green and Hendon, North-West London by her Jamaican grandparents. She went to primary school in Willesden and secondary school and sixth form in Hendon. Campbell went on to receive postgraduate qualifications from both City University and Goldsmiths.

== Career ==
Campbell is co-founder of A Very Good Company, a social innovation agency. As a non-executive director, she chaired the Nominet Trust and National Council for Voluntary Youth Services and she was on the board of UnLtd, the Foundation for Social Entrepreneurs, for 10 years.

Campbell worked as a broadcaster on Talkradio, launching the weekend prime time show 'Badass Women's Hour'. Campbell investigated the role of 'followership' for BBC Radio Podcast 'The Followership Game' and inspired listeners to think about the future of tech as a host of Virgin's 'Future Visions' podcast series.

Campbell served on the London Economic Action Partnership (LEAP) from December 2016 to March 2021, to support economic growth. From June 2017 to May 2022, Campbell held public appointments as a Civil Service Commissioner.

In January 2020, Campbell was appointed the Co-CEO at Belu, an ethical water company known for its philanthropic ethos, directing its net profits to support the humanitarian efforts of WaterAid.

In November 2022, Campbell was announced as Chancellor of the University of Westminster.

From June 2015 till June 2020, Campbell served as a board member of the UK Big Lottery Fund. From February 2018 till March 2020, Campbell became the founding director for The Royal Foundation of the Duke and Duchess of Cambridge/Sussex Royal.

As of April 2026, Campbell has been the Chair of The Workforce Development Trustgroup, incorporating Skills for Health, Skills for Justice, People 1st International, SFJ Awards and iCQ Awards.

== London mayoral candidacy ==
Campbell applied to be the Conservative Party candidate for Mayor of London for the 2024 election. In October 2023, she announced she would be running as an independent candidate. She won 47,815 votes (1.92% of the total).

== Honours ==
In 2016, Campbell received the ‘Community Spirit’ award at the ‘Women of the Future Awards’. Her contributions also merited recognition in the Management Today 35 Women Under 35 and City AM Power 100 Women lists. Additionally, in the 2020 Birthday Honours, Campbell was awarded the title of Member of the Order of the British Empire in acknowledgement "for services to social entrepreneurship and business".
