= Unmesh Desai =

British politician

Unmesh Desai AM
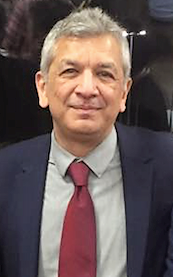
- Unmesh in 2017

Member of the London Assembly for City and East
- Incumbent
- Assumed office 6 May 2016
- Preceded by: John Biggs
- Majority: 70,487 (36.4%)

Councillor on London Borough of Newham for East Ham Central (2002-2018)
- In office 1998–2018

Personal details
- Party: Labour and Co-op
- Profession: Politician

Unmesh Desai is a British politician. A member of the Labour Party, he has represented the City and East constituency in the London Assembly since 2016. He served as a councillor on the London Borough of Newham from 1998 until 2018, representing East Ham Central from 2002 onwards. Desai has been an anti-racism activist since the 1970s; he organised marches and demonstrations in response to a wave of racist murders, and helped to found the Newham Youth Movement to confront the rise in racial violence and injustice. Desai was awarded the Freedom of the City of London in 2025 for services to politics.

== Background ==
Desai has resided in East London for more than 30 years. He previously trained and worked as a solicitor. He is a trustee of the West Ham United Foundation, President of the Newham Cricket Club and a Vice-President of the East London Rugby Club. Desai acted as election agent for Stephen Timms, the Labour MP for East Ham. He has written for The Guardian on the Prevent strategy. Desai has also been the Chair of the Newham Fabian Society for several years.

== Career ==
Desai was first elected to the Newham London Borough Council in 1998, representing St Stephens ward. He was subsequently elected as a councillor for East Ham Central in 2002 following a boundary change. He continued being a councillor for East Ham Central until 2018 when he stood down to focus on his London Assembly work. During his time on Newham Council he served as Cabinet Member for Crime and Anti-Social Behaviour.

In May 2016, Desai was elected to the London Assembly (succeeding John Biggs) as the member for City and East, winning nearly 58% of the vote. He was subsequently reselected as Labour candidate for the constituency for the 2020 London Assembly election.

Desai is Labour's London Assembly spokesperson on Policing and Crime and sits on the Budget and Performance Committee, Police and Crime Committee and Transport Committees. During his time on the Assembly, he has campaigned on issues including police pay and conditions, anti-fascism, and hate crime at football grounds.

In 2022, Desai successfully called for a Metropolitan Police investigation into breaches of Covid regulations at Downing Street under the Boris Johnson administration.

He has highlighted the phenomenon of "cuckooing", where criminals take control of a vulnerable person's home and use it for organised crime, writing a report "Protecting the Vulnerable: Addressing 'Cuckooing' in London" which showed there were 316 cases of cuckooing in 2022. The report set out recommendations to tackle the offense. Desai has continued this campaign, calling for cuckooing to be made a specific offence, and calling on the Metropolitan Police to enact his recommendations.

He has highlighted the impacts of police underfunding, focusing on screened out crime, Blue Badge theft and resources needed to police protests in London.

He has used his position to ensure that the Metropolitan Police build trust and confidence in their work following the Casey Review, monitoring the number of officers dismissed for misconduct, the number of hearings undertaken and new Policing Board that oversees standards in the Met. In 2025 he dramatically broke rank with his party to slam the police front desk closures

He has also called for greater action from police on violence against women, highlighting high rates of drink spiking in London and poor prosecution rates for female genital mutilation.

== Suspension ==
On 7 January 2025, Desai was administratively suspended by the Labour Party. Following an investigation which lasted some weeks, the police dismissed all charges against him and he was reinstated in the party.
