= Skills for Health =

United Kingdom government organisation

- Formation: 2002
- Headquarters: Cheese Lane, Bristol
- Services: Frameworks and standards, apprenticeships, workforce planning, research and evaluation, training, eLearning
- Chair: Natalie Campbell MBE
- Chief Executive: John Rogers
- Website: https://www.skillsforhealth.org.uk/

Skills for Health is the UK Sector Skills Council for Healthcare. Established in 2002 under the Labour Government, the organisation was one of a number of Sector Skills Councils created to support workforce development and skills within a number of key sectors.

Skills for Health was originally funded as part of the government's Sector Skills Development Agency, (later the UK Commission) and other governmental departments. This funding ceased in 2010 and the organisation went on to become a not for profit organisation.

== Key contributions to healthcare ==
=== Frameworks ===
Skills for Health, working with NHS England, authored of the Core Skills Training Framework (CSTF), a guideline for statutory and mandatory training within healthcare settings. The framework enables healthcare workers and their employers to ensure adherence with the Health and Safety at Work etc. Act 1974. The framework covers 11 areas, including equity, diversity and inclusion, safeguarding of children and adults, and information governance. Through robust training, and alignment with the CSTF, teams ensure compliance with regulation and mitigate risks in healthcare settings.

Skills for Health were also involved in the development and upkeep of the care certificate alongside Skills for Care. This framework is a set of standards developed for new and non-regulated health and social care support workers to ensure they have the necessary skills, knowledge, and behaviours to provide compassionate, safe, and high-quality care. It consists of 16 standards that are completed through a mix of theoretical and practical learning.

Skills for Health worked in collaboration with Skills for Care on the 2025 Care Certificate Framework update.

=== Workforce planning ===
Skills for Health also designed the Six Steps Methodology to Integrated Workforce Planning - a widely recognised framework to support workforce planning within the NHS and independent healthcare. Six Steps was the only workforce planning method cited in the NHS Long Term Workforce Plan (published in 2024) and is widely regarded as the go-to methodology within the UK healthcare sector.

=== Healthcare apprenticeships ===
Skills for Health partnered with NHS England on the Healthcare Apprenticeship Standards Online (HASO) initiative. Originally designed as part of the Workforce, Training and Education directorate strategic aims, HASO was aimed at employers and front-line managers, providing a wide range of resources and information to help navigate apprenticeships and technical education in the health sector. A suite of apprenticeship standards was created and aligned to healthcare occupations from level 2 to level 7 supporting up to 25,000 new apprentices each year. The HASO project concluded in 2025.

== Company ==
Skills for Health now operates as part of The Workforce Development Trust, alongside Skills for Justice, the Sector Skills Council for Justice, and People 1st International, the Sector Skills Council for Travel, Tourism, Retail, Hospitality and Aviation. The group also has two regulated awarding bodies, iCQ Awards and SFJ Awards who offer qualifications and assessments in a variety of sectors. The group is headquartered in the Cheese Lane Shot Tower in Bristol.
