= 2024 London mayoral election =

- 2 May 2024
- Opinion polls
- Registered: 6,162,428
- Turnout: 40.5% ▼1.7pp
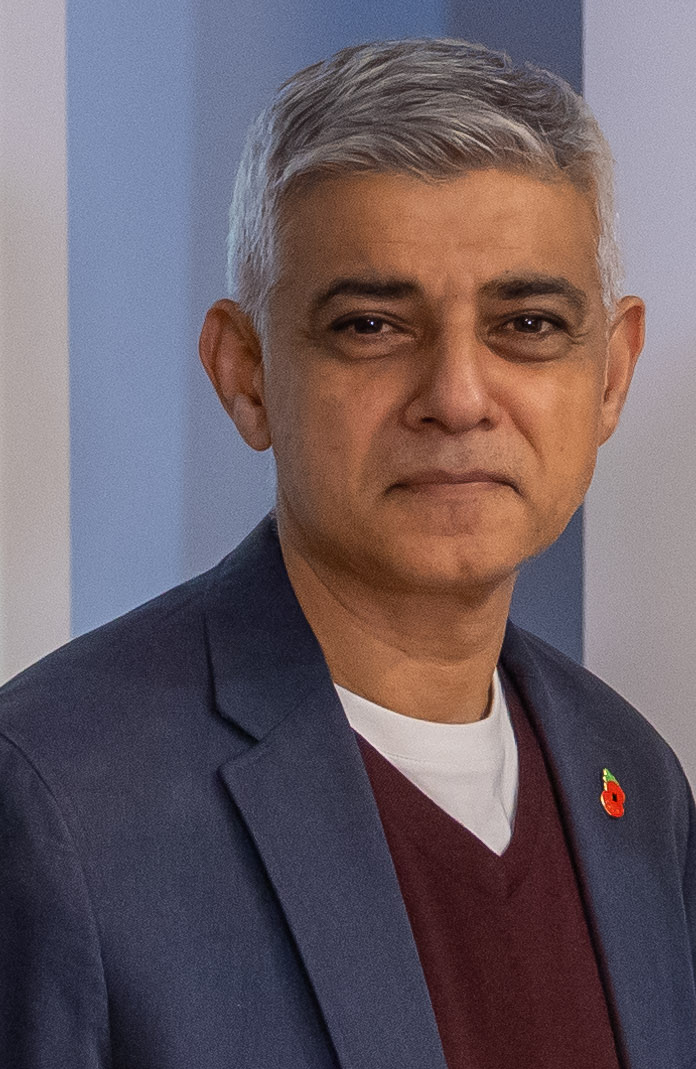

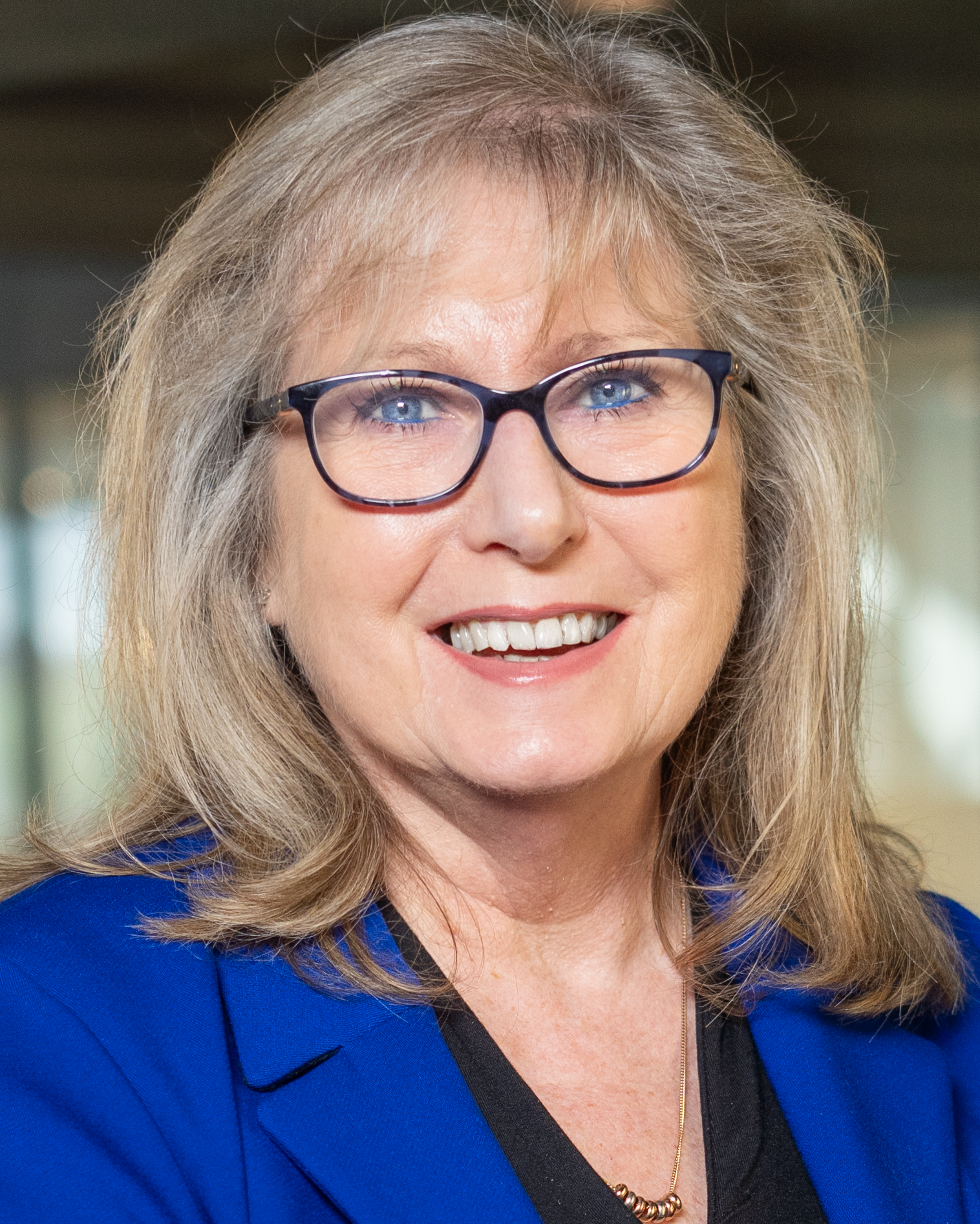

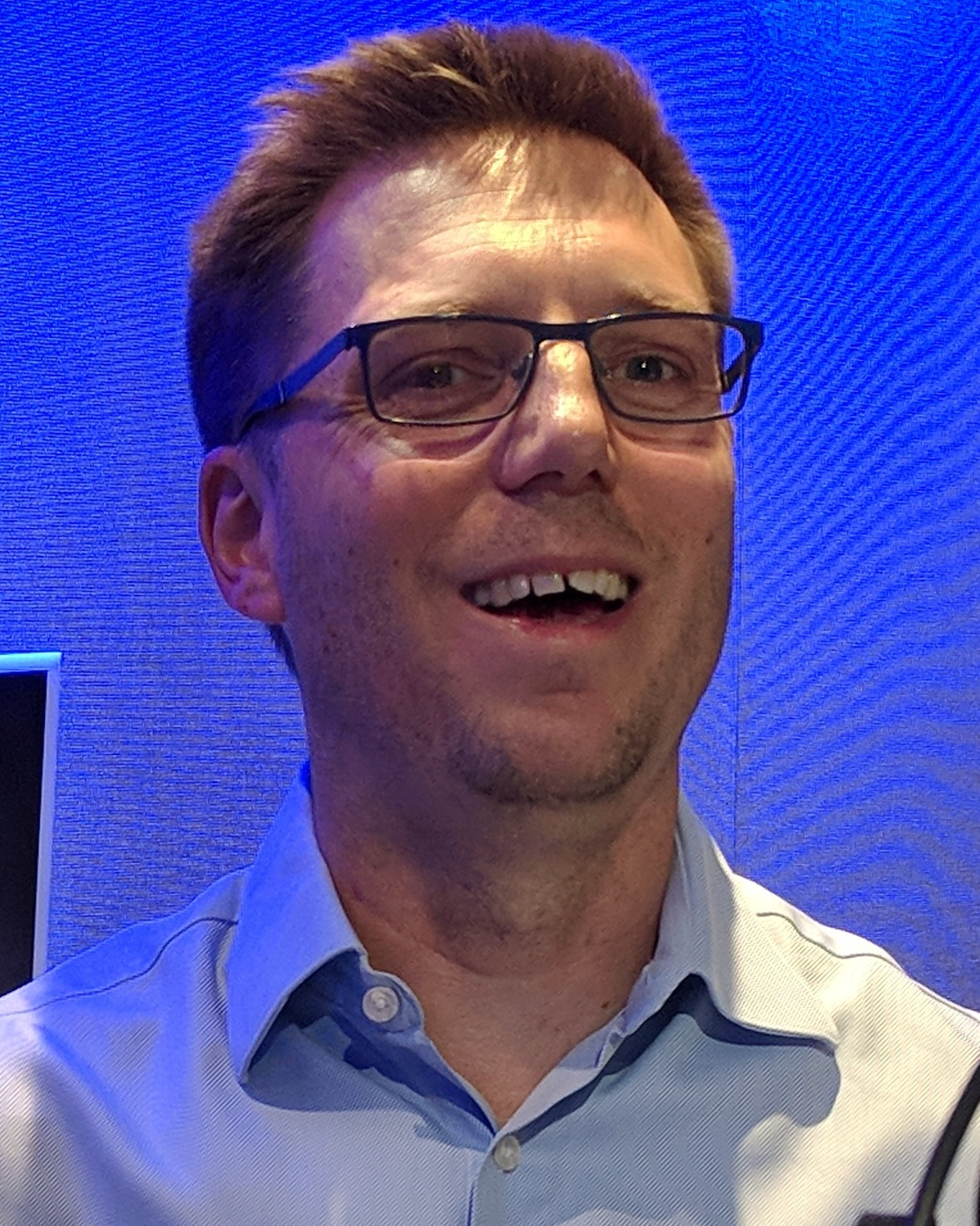

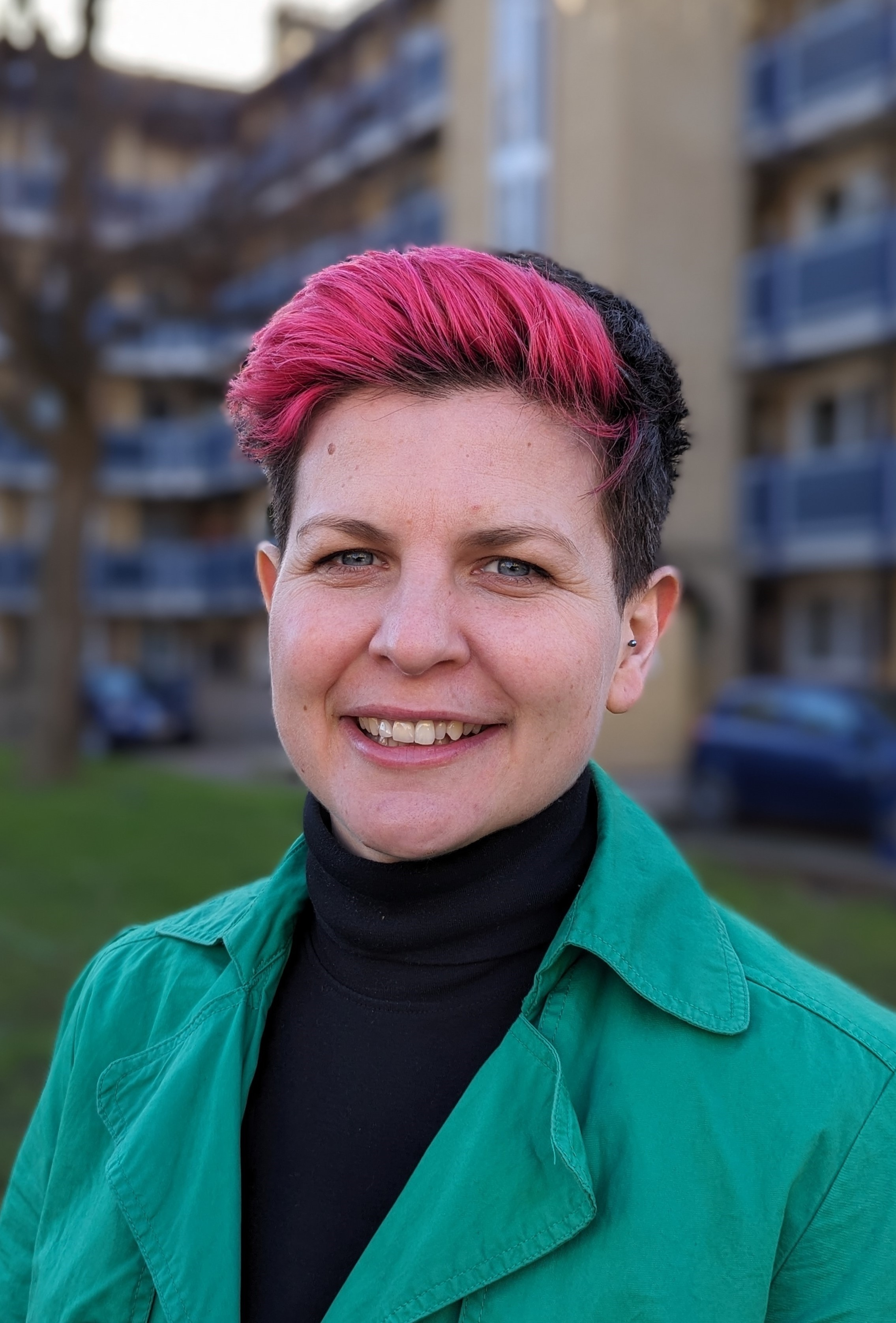
Candidate	Sadiq Khan	Susan Hall
Party	Labour	Conservative
Popular vote	1,088,225	812,397
Percentage	43.8% ▲3.8pp	32.7% ▼2.6pp
Candidate	Rob Blackie	Zoë Garbett
Party	Liberal Democrats	Green
Popular vote	145,184	145,114
Percentage	5.8% ▲1.4pp	5.8% ▼2.0pp
- Results by London Assembly constituencies
Mayor before election
Sadiq Khan
Labour
Elected Mayor
Sadiq Khan
Labour

The 2024 London mayoral election was held on 2 May 2024 to elect the next mayor of London. It took place simultaneously with elections to the London Assembly, some local council by-elections in London and regular local elections elsewhere in England and Wales. Following the Elections Act 2022, voting in this election took place under the first-past-the-post system for the first time and only time, replacing the supplementary vote system. The result of the election was announced on 4 May 2024.

Sadiq Khan of the Labour Party, who has served as the mayor of London since 2016, was re-elected as mayor and became the first person to be elected to the role for three terms. The Conservative Party stood former London Assembly Conservative leader Susan Hall as its candidate, the Green Party nominated Hackney borough councillor Zoë Garbett, the Liberal Democrats nominated Rob Blackie, and Reform UK nominated Howard Cox. There were eight other candidates.

== Background ==
The mayor of London has responsibilities covering policing, transport, housing, planning, economic development, arts, culture and the environment. They control a budget of around £18 billion per year. Mayors are typically elected for a period of four years, with no limit to the number of terms served. Under the Greater London Authority Act 1999, mayoral elections are held on the first Thursday in May in the fourth calendar year following the previous election, unless varied by an order by the Secretary of State. On 13 March 2020, the government announced the election would be postponed until 2021 due to the COVID-19 pandemic. The change in election date has been ignored when setting the date of the following election. Consequently, this election was held only three years after the 2021 London mayoral election that saw the Labour mayor Sadiq Khan re-elected.

In the 2022 London local elections, Labour gained control of Barnet, Wandsworth and Westminster councils from the Conservatives, but lost Croydon to no overall control, Harrow to the Conservatives and Tower Hamlets to Aspire, a local political party. Labour saw a small net gain in seats of 28 to 1,156 while the Conservatives lost 104 seats, winning 404 across Greater London. The Liberal Democrats and Greens both made gains, winning 180 and 18 seats respectively.

Khan froze London Underground fares from 2016 to 2020 and introduced a violence reduction unit into the Metropolitan Police. In August 2023, he announced a £135m programme to provide free school meals for all primary school children in London not covered by the UK government.

=== Ultra Low Emission Zone ===
Khan introduced an Ultra Low Emission Zone (ULEZ) in April 2019. The scheme had been initially planned by Boris Johnson when he was mayor. The scheme means that vehicles that fail to meet emissions standards need to pay a £12.50 charge each day they drive within the zone, with money raised from charges invested to improve transport and air quality. The zone was expanded in October 2021 to cover the area between the North Circular Road and the South Circular Road. Khan announced plans to further expand the ULEZ to cover the whole of Greater London in August 2023. The proposal was voted through by the London Assembly with support from Labour, Liberal Democrat and Green members and opposition from the Conservatives. The expansion was unsuccessfully legally challenged by four London borough councils and Surrey County Council. Khan had expressed a desire to replace the ULEZ in the future with a more comprehensive road pricing scheme. He later said that no such scheme would be introduced during his mayoralty. In July 2023, Labour failed to win the Uxbridge and South Ruislip by-election by a narrow margin, which was credited to local opposition to expansion of the ULEZ. Khan later extended financial support available to scrap non-compliant vehicles to all London residents, rather than the previous plan to apply a means test, funded from reserves.

== Electoral system ==
Nominations closed on 27 March.

Following the Elections Act 2022, the 2024 election used the first-past-the-post voting system. Prior elections had employed the supplementary vote system. The Greater London Authority considered changing to counting votes by hand instead of electronically to save money.

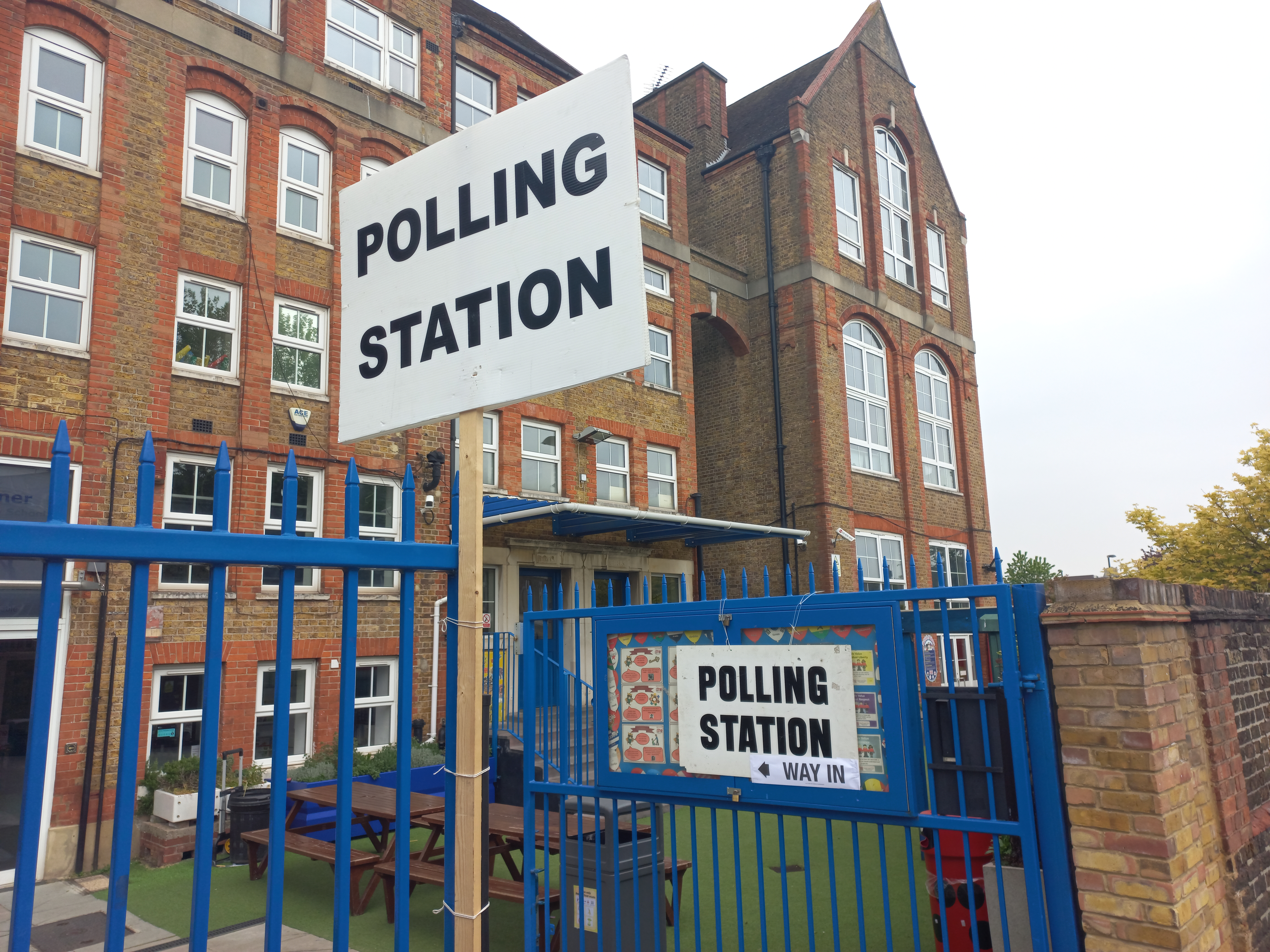
A primary school in the borough of Lewisham being used as a polling station on 2 May 2024.

All registered electors (including British, Commonwealth, Irish, and certain European Union citizens) living in London aged 18 or over were entitled to vote in the mayoral election.

== Campaign ==
The incumbent mayor Sadiq Khan announced in January 2022 that he would seek election to a third term as mayor of London. There had been speculation as to whether he would instead seek election to the House of Commons in hope of becoming leader of the Labour Party. The Labour Party officially reselected Khan as its candidate in December 2022 following a vote of party members and affiliated trade unions. Khan pledged to maintain the 2030 target for Greater London Authority operations to reach net zero emissions, including decarbonising all buses and establishing a fund to put solar panels on school roofs as part of a wider climate plan. He said he would establish a new publicly owned company to take over London buses with support from a potential future Labour government. He matched Hall's promise to extend Night Tube services to four more lines. Khan promised to increase police budgets by £88 million raised "mainly from council tax" and sought more central government funding for policing. He said he would hire 1,300 more police officers and establish a free legal advice service for victims of sexual offences. He promised to have built 40,000 new council houses between 2018 and 2030. Khan pledged to end rough sleeping in London by 2030 by investing £10 million to extend a network of hubs "designed to help an extra 1,700 rough sleepers every year with rapid reassessment and rehousing". He said he would not increase the minimum standards for the ULEZ, or seek further expansion. He promised not to introduce road pricing, which a Conservative election leaflet, designed to look like a penalty notice, accused him of doing. Labour reported the leaflets to the Crown Prosecution Service to assess their legality. Khan asked supporters of the Green Party and the Liberal Democrats to vote for him to avoid the Conservatives winning after making changes to voting ID laws and the electoral system. Khan was endorsed by Siobhan Benita, who was temporarily the Liberal Democrat mayoral candidate in 2020 before withdrawing. He was also endorsed by the actor Mark Hamill.

In July 2023, the Conservatives selected Susan Hall, a member of the London Assembly who led the Conservative group there from 2019 to 2023, as their candidate. Hall is considered to be on the right wing of the Conservative Party and had enthusiastically supported Liz Truss as prime minister and Donald Trump as president of the United States. In September 2023, Hall was reported to have liked a tweet that praised Enoch Powell (who gained fame for his Rivers of Blood speech) and liked tweets that described London's mayor Sadiq Khan as "our nipple height mayor of Londonistan" and a "traitor rat". When asked about the tweets, a spokesman for Hall's campaign said "Susan engages with many people on Twitter without endorsing their views". She later disavowed Powell. Several people in the Conservative Party said they should make the election a "referendum" on expansion of the ULEZ. Hall said she would reverse expansion of the ULEZ immediately if elected. She said she would remove 20 mph speed limits on main roads. Hall listed policing and housing as her other priorities. She pledged to extend Night Tube services to four more lines. Hall said she would "ban officers overtly supporting LGBT campaigns by wearing rainbow flag badges, or engaging in anti-racism gestures". She said she would increase police budgets by £200 million by cutting City Hall staff and Transport for London staff benefits, including pension spending. She said she would hire 1,500 more police officers and establish two new police bases in every borough. Hall promised to introduce a women's commissioner, increase British Transport Police presence and make it easier to report harassment to Transport for London staff. She said she would invest in knife detection equipment for police officers and schools. She supported "more family homes, even if they are high-density, low-rise, as long as they are beautiful homes". She promised to extend Khan's policy of free school meals for all primary school students for at least one more year. She said that tourists visiting from abroad should receive a value-added tax refund on purchases made in London. Hall was endorsed by an editorial in The Sunday Telegraph.

In February 2023 the Green Party selected Zoë Garbett, a councillor on Hackney London Borough Council who works on health inequalities for the NHS, to be their mayoral candidate. Garbett also ran in the 2023 Hackney mayoral by-election, where she came second with 24.5% of the vote. She said that if elected mayor of London, she would introduce free bus transport for people under the age of 22 and "free morning travel for older people", de-prioritise policing of cannabis and improve protection for renters. She proposed a strategy for London to reach zero murders by 2034, in part by hiring youth workers. She said she supported expansion of the ULEZ to cover all of Greater London, but wanted greater financial support for owners of non-compliant cars. She said that she wanted to replace the ULEZ and congestion charge with road pricing based on "distances driven, vehicle emissions, time of day and location", with potential to account for the number of passengers in the future. Garbett said that she wanted the Silvertown Tunnel to be closed to cars. She advocated a "London living wage" of £15 an hour. In January 2024 she proposed a two-year rent freeze and a rent commission that would set target rents. She said she would buy more homes from the general market to be let out as council housing.

The Liberal Democrats selected Rob Blackie in August 2023. Blackie said he would provide legal support to undocumented immigrants who had lived in London for several years to seek citizenship and maintain Khan's policy of free school meals for at least one more year. He promised to seek devolution of work permits in the form of a "London passport" to attract foreign workers. He said that reducing crime and prosecuting more sexual offenders were priorities for him, and that he would deprioritise the policing of drug possession and significantly reduce the use of Stop and Search powers. He proposed a new "Sexual Offences Unit" of the Metropolitan Police with a target of returning the proportion of sexual offenders being caught from 9% back to 18%, the level it was in 2016. He proposed a "voluntary tourist tax" levied on hotel bills to raise more funds for policing. Blackie promised to introduce grants to pay for the installation of solar panels and trialling both allowing all buses to be hailed from any location after 10 pm and free cycle hire on Sundays. He said he wanted ULEZ implementation to be "fairer", giving an example of some night shift workers being charged to both go to and leave work. Blackie said that Khan's policy of freezing London Underground fares was "phoney", as it did not apply to travelcard tickets or caps linked to travelcard prices. He promised to cancel the Underground fare freeze and suspension of peak prices on Fridays to increase police budgets by £117 million. He said that Khan and Hall would be equally bad mayors.

Reform UK announced the campaigner Howard Cox as their candidate in May 2023. Cox had campaigned against increases in Hydrocarbon Oil Duty, a tax on fossil fuels used by most road motor vehicles. Reform said that Cox would abolish the ULEZ entirely, end Low Traffic Neighbourhood schemes and reduce the use of 20 mph speed limits. He said he also wanted to "triple" both the number of police officers on the street and the amount of social housing being built. He said he recognised climate change, but did not believe it was caused by human activity and asserted that it is not a crisis. Cox said he had previously always voted Conservative. The party leader, Richard Tice, said the Conservatives should stand down and endorse Reform UK.

During the campaign, two televised debates were held: ITV held the first in mid-April, and the BBC held the second in late April. Both debates were attended by Khan, Hall, Garbett and Blackie.

The Evening Standard newspaper endorsed Khan, but noted that he "must rectify the failings of the first and second [terms] ... delivering on his promises on crime, housing and the cost of living"

== Candidates ==
=== Labour Party ===
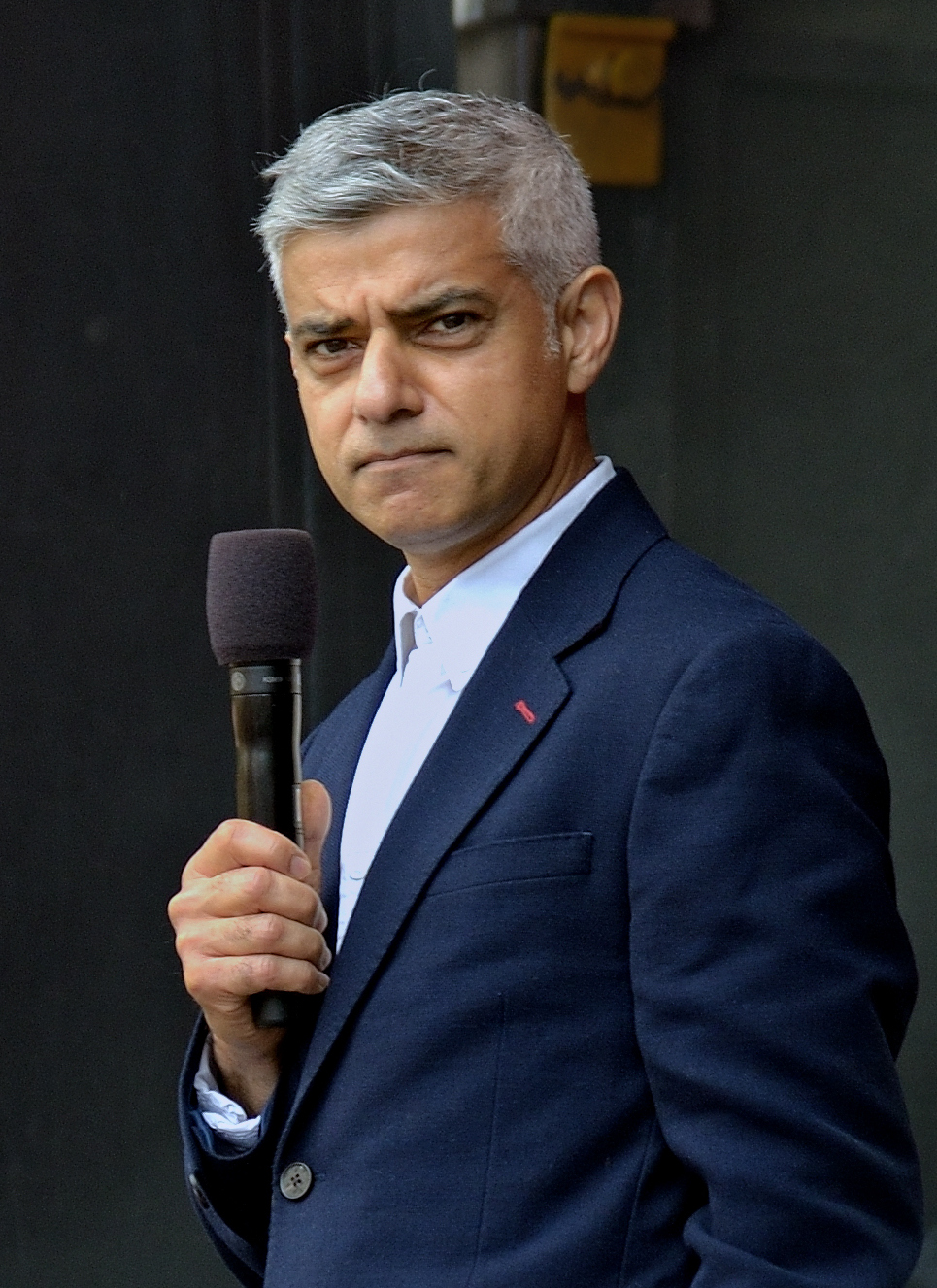
Sadiq Khan in 2019

The incumbent mayor Sadiq Khan announced in January 2022 that he would run for re-election. He became Labour's candidate after party members and affiliates voted to automatically reselect him in December 2022. 96% of local parties and party affiliates voted to re-select him without a contest, with some constituency Labour Parties, including Leyton and Wanstead and Tottenham, voting to open selection to more candidates. Khan had worked as a solicitor before being elected the Labour MP for Tooting in the 2005 general election. He held junior ministerial positions in Gordon Brown's government including spending a year as transport minister. From 2010 to 2015 he served as shadow justice secretary in Ed Miliband's shadow cabinet. He was first elected mayor of London in 2016, defeating the Conservative candidate Zac Goldsmith. He was re-elected in the delayed 2021 London mayoral election, that time beating the Conservative candidate Shaun Bailey.

The shadow foreign secretary David Lammy and the former speaker of the House of Commons John Bercow had been suggested as possible alternative candidates for the party.

=== Conservative Party ===
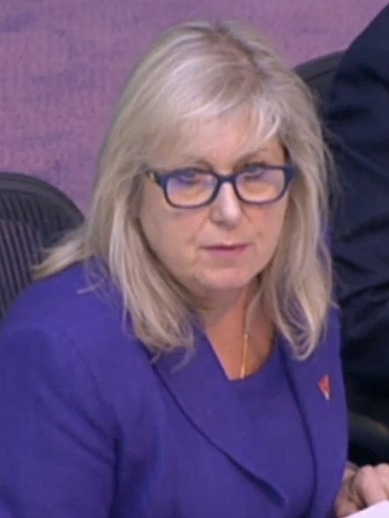
Susan Hall in 2018

In May 2023, the Conservatives set a timetable to announce a mayoral candidate on 18 July. Applications opened on 9 May and closed on 24 May, after which a longlist was produced. A committee was due to produce a shortlist of up to three candidates on 4 June, with local members voting to select a candidate from 4 to 18 July. It was reported that the Conservatives were seeking to find a celebrity or high-profile businessperson to run as their candidate, such as Karren Brady or Robert Rinder, but the party's former mayoral nominee Steven Norris said it was difficult to convince people to "potentially ruin their reputation, for half the city to hate them".

Several Conservative members declared their candidacies, including members of the London Assembly Andrew Boff, Susan Hall and Nick Rogers; the Minister for London Paul Scully MP; the Member of the Senedd Natasha Asghar; the former councillor Duwayne Brooks; the former special advisers Samuel Kasumu and Daniel Korski; and the businesspeople Natalie Campbell and Alex Challoner. Boff had sought the Conservative nomination in five previous mayoral elections, while Brooks sought the Liberal Democrat nomination in 2012 and 2016 and the Conservative nomination in 2021. Kasumu had worked as an adviser to Boris Johnson, but resigned in 2021, saying he thought that the Conservative Party were trying to "pick a fight on the culture war and to exploit division".

On the question of expansion of the Ultra Low Emission Zone to cover all of Greater London, Boff, Campbell, Rogers and Scully all said they would unilaterally reverse it if elected while Kasumu said he would grant referendums to affected boroughs to decide whether to be part of it. On housing, Kasumu said he wanted to "make boroughs more accountable for house building" while Rogers promised to develop policy aimed at renters. Scully said he would find new sites for housing, concentrating height in central London. Challoner said he would build five new neighbourhoods with ten thousand homes each. On policing and crime, Brooks said he would abolish the Directorate of Professional Standards of the Metropolitan Police, with investigations of police to be instead conducted by a new body of former police officers and lawyers. Challoner said he would establish a new police unit for burglary and car-related crimes. Campbell said she wanted to be more of a chief executive officer for London than a mayor.

Kasumu was endorsed by Steve Baker, Grant Shapps, Priti Patel and Nadine Dorries. Scully was endorsed by Rogers, who withdrew from the election on 19 May.

On 11 June, it was announced that Hall, Korski and the lawyer Mozammel Hossain had been chosen as the party's shortlist. Scully had been expected to be included, and Hossain's candidacy had not previously been public.

Hall was the only candidate to have held elected office, as a former council leader and member of the London Assembly. She said she would "get the basics right" by focusing on "policing, transport and housing" instead of "fancy ideas". On transport, she opposed expansion of the Ultra Low Emission Zone and said she would remove Low Traffic Neighbourhoods wherever she had the authority to. She opposes road pricing. She expressed concern that some striking London Underground staff "are earning far more than average" and pledged to review their pay and benefits. On crime, she said she would introduce a new unit of the Metropolitan police dedicated to burglary, theft, mugging and fences. On housing, she advocated high-density "green, community-oriented places" but opposed any construction on the green belt. She voted for the UK to leave the European Union in the 2016 referendum and supported the leadership campaign of Liz Truss.

Hossain is a criminal barrister. He said he would appeal more than the other candidates to ethnic minority voters. He said he would lobby the government for deregulation to "attract big business". He supported more use of stop and search said he would "crack down" on drill music. He voted for the UK to remain in the European Union in the 2016 referendum. Hossain's campaign manager, Ben Mallett, and another member of his team, Malin Bogue, both appeared in a short video clip taken at a Christmas party on 14 December 2020 at Conservative Campaign Headquarters, made available by the Daily Mirror in June 2023. His supporter Nick Candy was also at the event, which was held while London was in Tier 2 COVID-19 restrictions, one of the events collectively known as Partygate. The clip shows people ignoring social distancing, including Bogue dancing with someone. The invitation for the event, sent out on behalf of Mallet, described it with the words "Jingle and Mingle". Hossain was also supported by Iain Duncan Smith.

According to The Telegraph, Korski was the candidate preferred by the Conservative Party's leadership. Instead of ULEZ expansion, Korski said he wanted to plant trees, electrify buses and referred to "large ventilators on billboards that suck the pollution out of the air" in Peru as a better solution. He said he would build more housing over train stations and railway tracks. He also said he wanted to create a tourist tax to fund a new "minor crimes constabulary" among other police projects. He voted for the UK to remain in the European Union in the 2016 referendum and supported Tom Tugendhat's Conservative leadership campaign. Korski was endorsed by George Freeman and Michael Gove and claimed endorsements from Alicia Kearns, Andrew Mitchell, Joanna Shields and Tugendhat.

During a hustings event, all of the candidates said they would cancel expansion of the ULEZ, with Korski supporting a road pricing system instead. All the candidates said they would invest more in community policing.

In June 2023, the TV producer Daisy Goodwin said that Korski had groped her during a meeting in Downing Street a decade earlier. She had described the event some years earlier but without naming Korski. Korski denied the allegation. On 28 June, he withdrew his candidacy. He said that he had mentioned the existence of the "story" to the party during the selection process. Some argued that the contest should be re-started after Korski pulled out. Broadcaster and former Conservative Party Parliamentary candidate Iain Dale, who said he himself was approached on three separate occasions to seek the Conservative mayoral nomination, was critical of the decision not to do so.

Susan Hall was announced as the candidate on 19 July 2023, winning 57% of the vote against Hossain.

Candidate	Votes	Of total
Susan Hall		57%
Mozammel Hossain		43%

==== Nominated ====
- Susan Hall, member of the London Assembly since 2017

==== Shortlisted ====
- Mozammel Hossain, KC, criminal barrister
- Daniel Korski, businessman and former special adviser to then-prime minister David Cameron (withdrew due to groping allegations)

==== Applied but not shortlisted ====
- Natasha Asghar, member of the Senedd (Welsh Parliament)
- Andrew Boff, chair of the London Assembly and candidate for mayor in 2000, 2004, 2008, 2016 and 2021
- Duwayne Brooks, former Lewisham borough councillor
- Natalie Campbell, businessperson
- Alex Challoner, businessperson
- Samuel Kasumu, Welwyn Hatfield borough councillor and former special adviser to then-prime minister Boris Johnson
- Paul Scully, minister for London and MP for Sutton and Cheam

==== Withdrew ====
- Nick Rogers, member of the London Assembly since 2021 (endorsed Scully)

=== Green Party ===
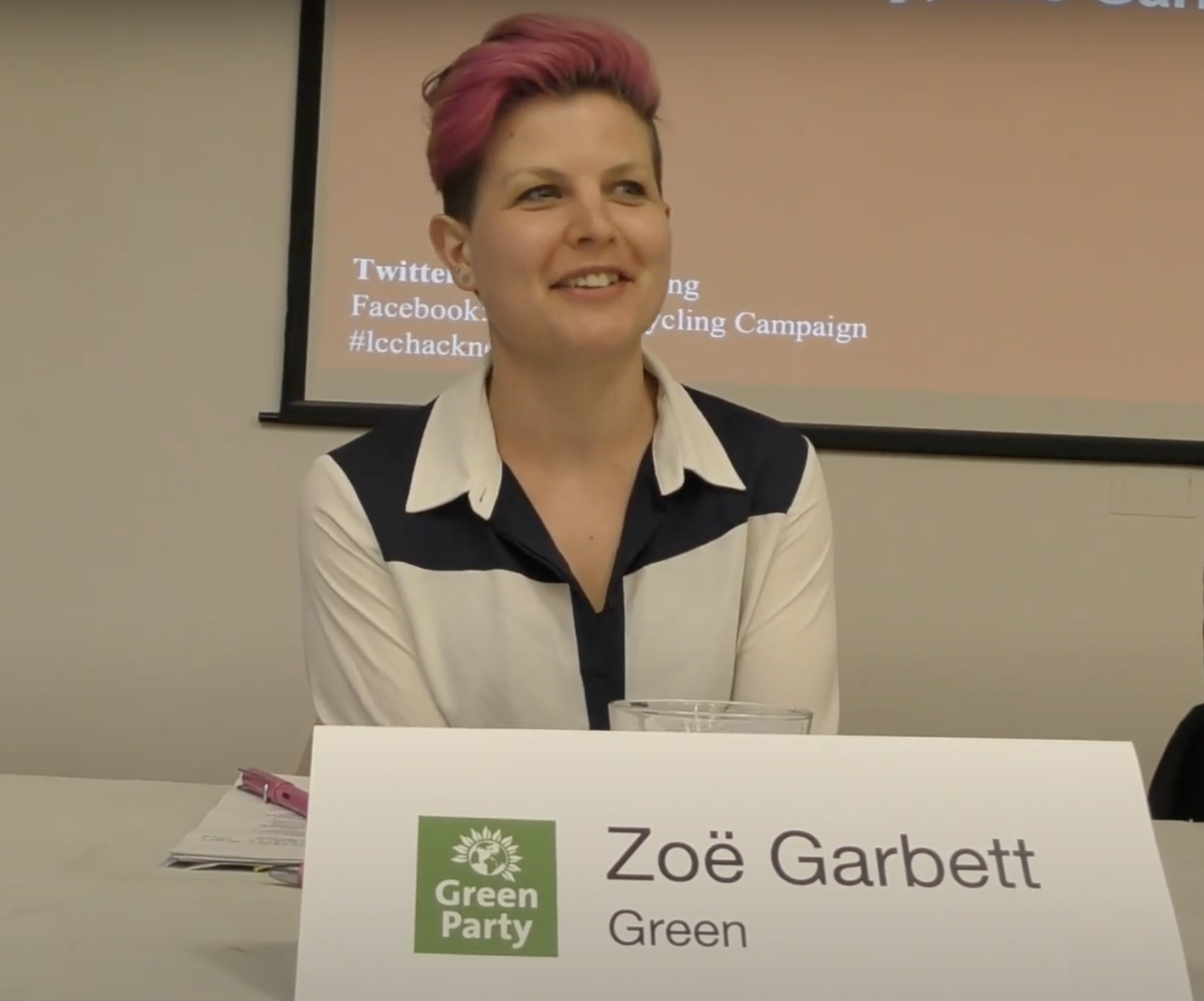
Zoë Garbett in 2022

The Green Party nominated Zoë Garbett as its candidate. Garbett was elected as councillor for Dalston ward on Hackney London Borough Council in 2022, simultaneously coming second in the election for mayor of Hackney with 17.0% of the vote. At the time of her selection she worked for the NHS on health inequalities. She had been endorsed by the party's only MP Caroline Lucas and two members of the London Assembly, Siân Berry and Caroline Russell; Berry had served as the party's mayoral candidate on three former occasions.

Two other candidates, the councillor and former MEP Scott Ainslie and the councillor Benali Hamdache, contested the nomination. Ainslie had campaigned on "retrofitting London's homes, delivering free school meals for all primary school children, and ensuring London's pension funds are divested from fossil fuels" while Hamdache had advocated "a tourist tax and a workplace parking levy in London" and replacing the London Assembly with a new London Parliament.

==== Nominated ====
- Zoë Garbett, Hackney borough councillor and nominee for mayor of Hackney in 2022 and 2023

==== Applied for nomination ====
- Scott Ainslie, Lambeth borough councillor and former MEP for London
- Benali Hamdache, Islington borough councillor

==== Declined ====
- Siân Berry, member of the London Assembly since 2016, former leader of the Green Party, and nominee for mayor in 2008, 2016, and 2021 (endorsed Garbett)

==== Results ====
Green Party London mayoral candidate selection
Candidate	Votes	Of total
Zoë Garbett		51.2%
Benali Hamdache		26.5%
Scott Ainslie		20.5%
Reopen nominations		1.8%

=== Liberal Democrats ===
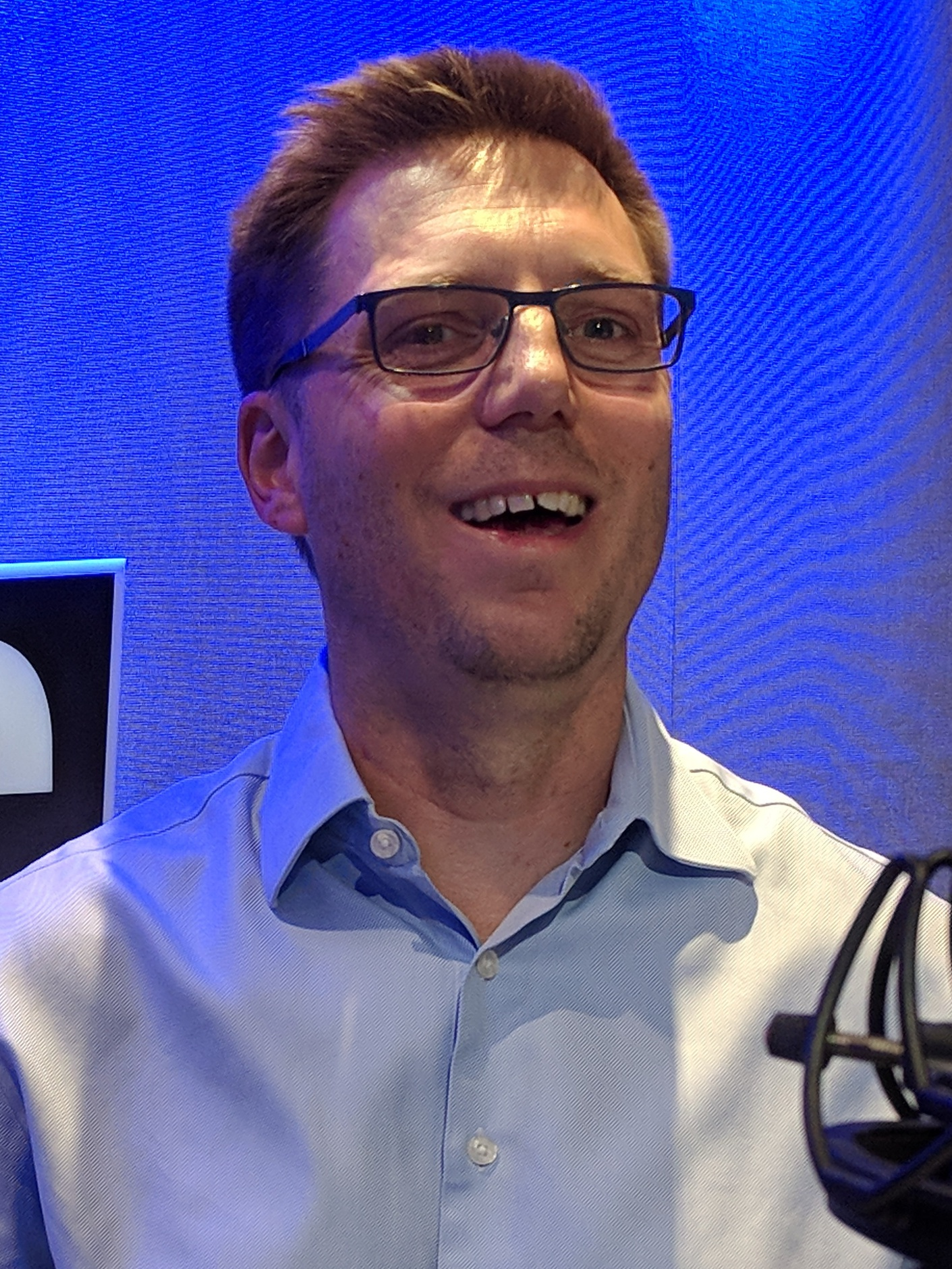
Rob Blackie was selected as the Liberal Democrat candidate

The Liberal Democrats announced their candidate, Rob Blackie on 11 August 2023. He was chosen by a vote of party members from a shortlist of two, Blackie and Chris French. Blackie works in digital marketing and worked on the Best for Britain anti-Brexit campaign. He said he would re-prioritise the Met Police towards sexual offences and away from "low-level drug offences". He also promised cleaner rivers, more solar panels and better transport links for outer London. French, who works as a community advocate and previously served as a special constable, had said he would reform policing and reduce health inequalities.

Blackie was being treated for cancer in 2023–4. He had his left kidney removed in February 2023 and announced the successful completion of his cancer treatment in March 2024.

=== Reform UK ===
Reform UK selected Howard Cox, a campaigner against Hydrocarbon Oil Duty increases, as its candidate.

=== Other candidates ===
Party	Candidate	Notes/sources
Animal Welfare Party	Femy Amin	Femy Amin stood for the Animal Welfare Party.
Count Binface Party	Count Binface	Count Binface, a satirical candidate who stood in the 2021 London mayoral election, announced his candidacy in March 2024. The candidate previously came ninth out of twenty candidates in the 2021 London mayoral election with 1.0% of the vote.
Independent	Natalie Campbell	Natalie Campbell, a businessperson who applied for the Conservative candidacy, announced that she would run as an independent. She said she would consider abolishing the Metropolitan Police and replacing them with a new police force. She had opposed the expansion of the ULEZ, but said she would only reverse it if it were cost-effective. She supports the Bakerloo line extension.
Social Democratic Party	Amy Gallagher	Amy Gallagher, a nurse who took legal action against the Tavistock and Portman NHS Foundation Trust over alleged discrimination, was announced as the Social Democratic Party's candidate in December 2023. She said she would provide free transport for people under the age of 25 and "push back on woke ideology".
Independent	Tarun Ghulati	Tarun Ghulati, an Indian-born investment banker, declared his candidature in November 2023, saying he would eliminate the ULEZ, remove the congestion charge for weekends and holidays, and abolish 20 mph speed limit zones and Low Traffic Neighbourhoods. He also said he would focus on affordable housing. He promised to re-open police stations in areas with a lot of crime.
Independent	Andreas Michli	Andreas Michli, a businessperson, said he would run as an independent candidate. He pledged to abolish the ULEZ, low-traffic neighbourhoods, the congestion charge, and the target for net zero emissions. He said he wanted police officers to be trained in Brazilian jiu-jitsu to blue belt, and in the law "comparable to a solicitor". He said that as mayor he would give free gym memberships for London residents. He said he had been "radicalised by lockdown". He unsuccessfully appealed two fixed penalty notices for breaking lockdown rules.
London Real Party	Brian Rose	Brian Rose, a podcaster who promoted misinformation about the COVID-19 pandemic and stood in the 2021 election, said he would seek election again under the banner of his London Real party. He said he would abolish the ULEZ, privatise Transport for London, and seek to deregulate cryptocurrency investment.
Britain First	Nick Scanlon	Nick Scanlon ran for the Britain First party.

=== Not nominated ===
==== Declared but not nominated ====
Several people declared they would stand or launched campaigns, but were not ultimately nominated.

- Shyam Batra, a finance broker, announced in January 2024 that he would stand as an independent candidate, saying he would abolish the ULEZ, congestion zone, and 20 mph speed limits as well as introducing support "to get everyone on the housing ladder". LBC reported that he was prohibited from being a company director and believed aliens were "blending into our communities".
- Piers Corbyn, a conspiracy theorist who stood for the Let London Live party in 2021, said he would run in the 2024 election.
- Laurence Fox of the Reclaim Party sought to stand, but failed to complete his nomination papers correctly in time.
- George Galloway, recently the MP for Rochdale and current leader of the Workers Party of Britain, announced his candidacy in December 2023. Galloway subsequently was elected to Parliament in the 2024 Rochdale by-election. The Workers Party of Britain did not nominate a candidate for the election.
- Niko Omilana, a YouTuber who stood as an independent candidate in 2021, was unable to stand as his nomination papers were found to be invalid.

==== Withdrew ====
- Serge Crowbolder, a deliveryman, intended to run as an independent. He said he would lobby the government to facilitate a system to reduce rents, establish an e-democracy platform, look to provide solar panels and heat pumps to every home, and commission a feasibility study into the building of a dam between Essex and Kent. He withdrew his candidacy having been unable to raise funds for a deposit.
- Rayhan Haque, a campaigner, said he would increase support for cyclists, explore car-free days like those used in Paris, and create an academy to teach London residents about artificial intelligence to "surpass what San Francisco is doing". Haque left the Labour Party in 2019. He withdrew his candidacy in March 2024, saying he could not win and did not want "the progressive vote to be splintered".

==== Potential ====
The former leader of the Labour Party Jeremy Corbyn said he would think about standing for mayor as an independent when asked at the Edinburgh Festival Fringe in August 2023. Corbyn is the MP for Islington North and was a Labour member at the time, but was expelled from the Party after successfully running as an independent in the 2024 United Kingdom general election. Corbyn had been included as a named candidate on some polls; polling in September 2023 by Redfield & Wilson found that Khan led without Corbyn listed, but that Corbyn's inclusion resulted in a Hall lead.

It had been speculated that the former prime minister Boris Johnson might stand as an independent candidate. Johnson previously served as mayor of London from 2008 to 2016.

In August 2023, the former Conservative cabinet minister and 2019 leadership election candidate, Rory Stewart, declined to rule out contesting the mayoralty in 2024 upon relocating to Britain, having withdrawn his initial candidacy ahead of the previous election in 2021.

== Opinion polls ==
=== Declared candidates ===

Dates conducted	Pollster	Client	Sample size	Khan	Hall	Garbett	Blackie	Cox	Oth.	Lead
Dates conducted	Pollster	Client	Sample size	Lab	Con	Green	Lib Dem	Reform	Oth.	Lead
2 May 2024	2024 mayoral election		–	43.8%	32.7%	5.8%	5.8%	3.1%	8.7%	11.1%
24–30 Apr 2024	YouGov	N/A	1,192	47%	25%	7%	6%	6%	8% Binface on 3% Gallagher on 1% Amin on 1% Scanlon on 1% Campbell on 1% Michli on 1% Rose on 0% Ghulati on 0%	22%
16–17 Apr 2024	YouGov	N/A	1,157	46%	27%	9%	8%	6%	4%	19%
8–17 Apr 2024	Savanta	Mile End Institute	1,034	46%	33%	7%	9%	2%	2%	13%
6–8 Apr 2024	Redfield & Wilton	N/A	1,000	43%	30%	10%	8%	7%	2%	13%
21–26 Mar 2024	Survation	ITV News	1,019	44%	26%	7%	7%	5%	10% Rose on 3% Campbell on 3% Binface on 1% Ghulati on 1% Michli on 1% Gallagher on 1% Batra on 1% Other on 0%	18%
8–12 Mar 2024	Savanta	Centre for London	1,510	51%	27%	8%	10%	2%	2%	24%
12–19 Feb 2024	YouGov	Mile End Institute	1,113	49%	24%	9%	8%	7%	3%	25%
6–10 Nov 2023	Find Out Now	Evening Standard	2,730	46%	25%	9%	9%	6%	5%	21%
31 Oct – 8 Nov 2023	Lord Ashcroft	N/A	3,418	50%	23%	7%	10%	5%	5%	27%
12–17 Oct 2023	YouGov/QMUL	Evening Standard	1,066	50%	25%	11%	7%	4%	3%	25%
9–21 Sep 2023	JL Partners	The Sun	1,000	40%	36%	6%	6%	9%	3%	4%
4–6 Sep 2023	Redfield & Wilton	The Times	1,100	33%	32%	9%	16%	4%	6%	1%
30 Jun – 5 Jul 2023	Survation	N/A	1,060	43%	31% (Note: Generic Conservative Party candidate)	9%	16% (Note: Generic Liberal Democrat candidate)	1%	1%	12%
10–12 Jun 2023	Redfield & Wilton	N/A	1,100	41%	33%	7%	8%	5%	5%	8%
6 May 2021	2021 mayoral election (Note: First preference vote shares shown)		–	40%	35.3%	7.8%	4.4%	–	12.5%	4.7%

=== Including candidates who did not stand ===
These polls included former Labour leader Jeremy Corbyn as an independent candidate.

Dates conducted	Pollster	Client	Sample size								
Dates conducted	Pollster	Client	Sample size	Khan	Hall	Garbett	Blackie	Cox	Corbyn	Oth.	Lead
Dates conducted	Pollster	Client	Sample size	Lab	Con	Green	Lib Dem	Reform	Ind	Oth.	Lead
6–10 Nov 2023	Find Out Now	Evening Standard	2,730	39%	24%	6%	8%	5%	14%	4%	15%
31 Oct – 8 Nov 2023	Lord Ashcroft	N/A	3,418	41%	22%	6%	9%	5%	14%	3%	19%
9–21 Sep 2023	JL Partners	The Sun	1,000	37%	35%	6%	5%	8%	6%	3%	2%
4–6 Sep 2023	Redfield & Wilton	The Times	1,100	25%	30%	6%	15%	5%	15%	3%	5%
10–12 Jun 2023	Redfield & Wilton	N/A	1,100	32%	28%	9%	10%	8%	7%	6%	4%
6 May 2021	2021 mayoral election		–	40%	35.3%	7.8%	4.4%	–	–	12.5%	4.7%

== Results ==
The election was won by Sadiq Khan of the Labour Party, becoming the first Mayor of London to win a third term of office. Khan increased his share of the vote by 3.8% compared to 2021. Susan Hall of the Conservative Party came second; however, the Conservative share of the vote fell by 2.6% compared to 2021. Rob Blackie of the Liberal Democrats took third place by 70 votes, with the Greens falling to fourth place for the first time since the 2008 election.

Before the announcement of the results, rumours circulated on social media that Susan Hall's team believed she had won the election. David C Bannerman, a former Conservative Member of the European Parliament, said on X (then Twitter) that "rumours emerging that Susan Hall has won London Mayoral on low turnout," although he cautioned that his was not yet confirmed. A Conservative Party source told the Independent that the result was "extremely close" and that Hall "may have won", adding there were "some in the team who genuinely believe she has done it."

After Khan's victory, which saw an improvement on his 2021 performance, senior figures in the Conservative Party blamed "overexcited" activists for the rumours. Journalist James Ball wrote in the New European that some of the rumours came about because of "sampling" of votes before the counting began, as votes were counted on Friday evening after being cast on Thursday.

The turnout of 40.5% was the lowest since the 2012 London mayoral election. The number of rejected ballots (11,127) was substantially lower than the 2021 London mayoral election, in which over 114,000 first preference ballots were rejected.

2024 London mayoral election
Party	Candidate	Votes	Of total (%)	± (pp), party
Labour	Sadiq Khan	1,088,225	43.8	+3.8
Conservative	Susan Hall	812,397	32.7	−2.6
Liberal Democrats	Rob Blackie	145,184	5.8	+1.4
Green	Zoë Garbett	145,114	5.8	−2.0
Reform	Howard Cox	78,865	3.1	New
Independent	Natalie Campbell	47,815	1.9	New
SDP	Amy Gallagher	34,449	1.4	+1.1
Animal Welfare	Femy Amin	29,280	1.2	New
Independent	Andreas Michli	26,121	1.1	New
Independent	Tarun Ghulati	24,702	1.0	New
Binface	Count Binface	24,260	1.0	0.0
Britain First	Nick Scanlon	20,519	0.8	New
London Real	Brian Rose	7,501	0.3	−0.9
Majority		276,008	11.1	
Rejected ballots		11,127	0.4	
Turnout		2,495,559	40.5	−1.5
Registered electors		6,162,428		
Labour hold				

=== By constituencies ===
Candidate
Candidate	Sadiq Khan		Susan Hall		Rob Blackie		Zoë Garbett		Howard Cox		Natalie Campbell		Amy Gallagher		Femy Amin		Andreas Michli		Tarun Ghulati		Count Binface		Nick Scanlon		Brian Rose		Total Votes
Candidate	Labour		Conservative		Lib Dem		Green		Reform UK		Independent		SDP		AWP		Independent		Independent		Count Binface		Britain First		London Real		Total Votes
Constituency	Votes	%	Votes	%	Votes	%	Votes	%	Votes	%	Votes	%	Votes	%	Votes	%	Votes	%	Votes	%	Votes	%	Votes	%	Votes	%	Total Votes
Barnet and Camden	70,984	43.5%	57,465	35.2%	8,480	5.2%	9,044	5.5%	4,266	2.6%	2,810	1.7%	1,987	1.2%	1,833	1.1%	1,669	1.0%	1,251	0.8%	1,701	1.0%	1,086	0.7%	479	0.3%	163,055
Bexley and Bromley	48,952	24.1%	111,216	54.6%	10,111	5.0%	8,600	4.2%	9,243	4.5%	2,727	1.3%	3,710	1.8%	1,899	0.9%	1,513	0.7%	1,194	0.6%	1,827	0.9%	2,174	1.1%	342	0.2%	203,508
Brent and Harrow	58,743	37.2%	66,151	41.8%	7,184	4.5%	6,984	4.4%	3,636	2.3%	4,512	2.9%	1,702	1.1%	2,158	1.4%	1,349	0.9%	2,933	1.9%	1,265	0.8%	982	0.6%	486	0.3%	158,085
City and East	108,977	55.9%	38,626	19.8%	7,551	3.9%	13,256	6.8%	6,898	3.5%	4,149	2.1%	2,686	1.4%	2,671	1.4%	2,473	1.3%	2,692	1.4%	1,918	1.0%	2,019	1.0%	924	0.5%	194,840
Croydon and Sutton	59,482	32.1%	78,790	42.5%	14,400	7.8%	9,740	5.3%	6,518	3.5%	3,695	2.0%	3,166	1.7%	2,074	1.1%	2,081	1.1%	1,774	1.0%	1,689	0.9%	1,700	0.9%	414	0.2%	185,523
Ealing and Hillingdon	73,257	37.7%	75,396	38.8%	10,124	5.2%	10,508	5.4%	6,983	3.6%	3,587	1.8%	2,643	1.4%	2,809	1.4%	1,919	1.0%	2,659	1.4%	1,997	1.0%	1,761	0.9%	542	0.3%	194,185
Enfield and Haringey	82,725	50.3%	41,389	25.2%	7,947	4.8%	11,799	7.2%	4,969	3.0%	3,056	1.9%	2,495	1.5%	2,082	1.3%	3,963	2.4%	1,032	0.6%	1,471	0.9%	1,019	0.6%	579	0.4%	164,526
Greenwich and Lewisham	83,792	52.2%	36,822	23.0%	7,713	4.8%	11,209	7.0%	5,716	3.6%	3,502	2.2%	2,813	1.8%	1,915	1.2%	1,610	1.0%	1,033	0.6%	1,706	1.1%	2,092	1.3%	507	0.3%	160,430
Havering and Redbridge	50,780	29.5%	82,859	48.1%	6,417	3.7%	7,859	4.6%	7,554	4.4%	2,775	1.6%	2,252	1.3%	1,986	1.2%	2,000	1.2%	3,692	2.1%	1,466	0.9%	2,023	1.2%	592	0.3%	172,255
Lambeth and Southwark	106,861	61.2%	26,347	15.1%	11,463	6.6%	12,446	7.1%	3,990	2.3%	4,005	2.3%	2,167	1.2%	1,675	1.0%	1,528	0.9%	954	0.5%	1,838	1.1%	1,043	0.6%	427	0.2%	174,744
Merton and Wandsworth	84,725	48.1%	50,976	28.9%	13,153	7.5%	9,646	5.5%	4,495	2.6%	3,439	2.0%	2,192	1.2%	2,018	1.1%	1,359	0.8%	1,030	0.6%	1,889	1.1%	961	0.5%	376	0.2%	176,259
North East	127,455	61.7%	34,099	16.5%	7,399	3.6%	17,907	8.7%	4,485	2.2%	3,804	1.8%	2,423	1.2%	2,134	1.0%	2,087	1.0%	922	0.4%	1,929	0.9%	1,095	0.5%	955	0.5%	206,694
South West	77,011	37.5%	68,856	33.5%	25,579	12.5%	10,132	4.9%	6,634	3.2%	3,202	1.6%	2,771	1.3%	2,640	1.3%	1,669	0.8%	2,436	1.2%	2,304	1.1%	1,600	0.8%	528	0.3%	205,362
West Central	54,481	43.6%	43,405	34.7%	7,663	6.1%	5,984	4.8%	3,478	2.8%	2,552	2.0%	1,442	1.2%	1,386	1.1%	901	0.7%	1,100	0.9%	1,260	1.0%	964	0.8%	350	0.3%	124,966
Total Votes	1,088,225	43.8%	812,397	32.7%	145,184	5.8%	145,114	5.8%	78,865	3.2%	47,815	1.9%	34,449	1.4%	29,280	1.2%	26,121	1.1%	24,702	1.0%	24,260	1.0%	20,519	0.8%	7,501	0.3%	2,484,432
