= Howard Cox (British politician) =

British politician (born 1954)

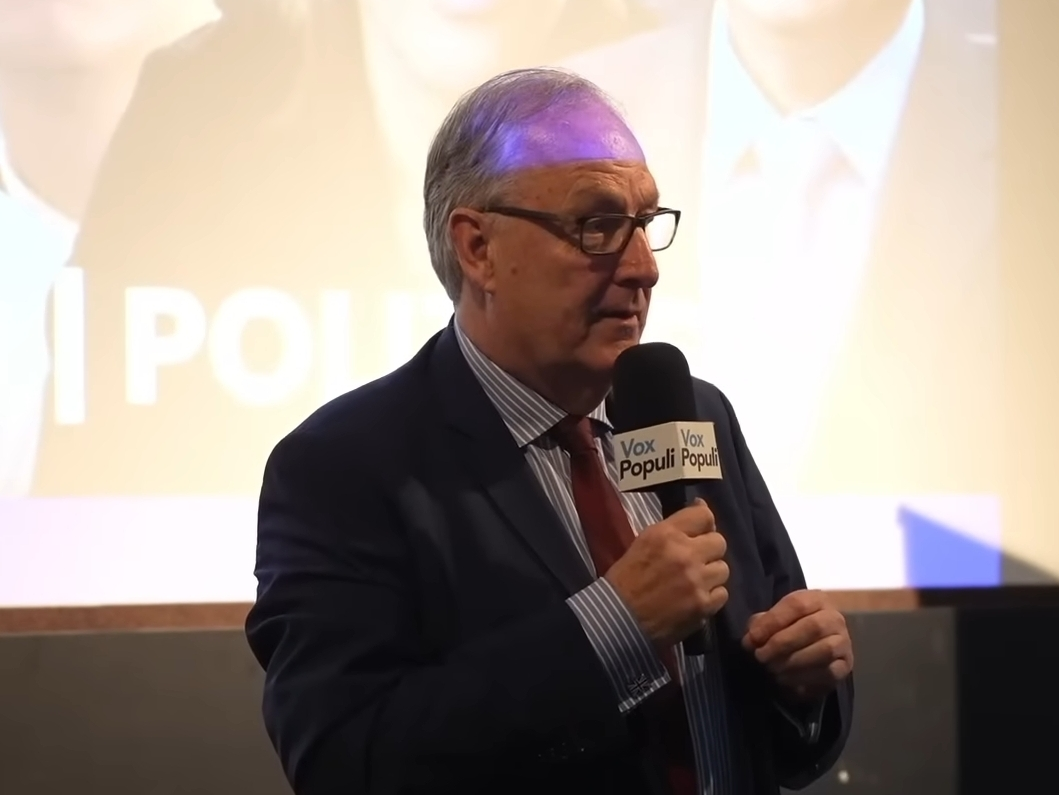
- Cox speaking in December 2025.
- Born: December 1954 (age 71); Lewisham, London, England
- Known for: Founder of FairFuelUK
- Political party: Restore Britain (since 2026)
- Other political affiliations: Advance UK (2025–2026); Reform UK (2023–2025); Conservatives (before 2023)
- Spouse: Jenny Cox
- Children: 1

Howard Christopher Cox (born December 1954) is a British politician and campaigner, who founded the motorist lobby group FairFuelUK in 2010. He stood as the Reform UK candidate at the 2024 London mayoral election, but later left the party on 'free speech grounds' and joined Advance UK.

== FairFuelUK ==
FairFuelUK was co-founded by Howard Cox and Quentin Willson in 2010 to campaign against fuel duty increases. The group is funded by the freight industry, including groups such as the Road Haulage Association and Logistics UK. Cox claims to have saved motorists from £200 billion in fuel duty rises.

In August 2021, Willson left the group, accusing it of spreading "urban myths" about electric vehicles. Cox stated that he hadn't spoken to Willson for three years.

In March 2022, an investigation by DeSmog found that Cox, who was involved with the all-party parliamentary group (APPG) on fair fuel, was a director of Ultimum, a company which marketed a fuel additive. Cox denied there being any conflict of interest.

After the outbreak of the Iran war in March 2026, FairFuelUK called on Rachel Reeves to cut fuel duty in order to relieve inflation pressures.

== Political career ==
Cox was a lifelong supporter of the Conservatives prior to 9 May 2023, when he was selected as the Reform UK candidate for the 2024 London mayoral elections. He said he would abolish both the Ultra Low Emission Zone (ULEZ) and Low traffic neighbourhoods (LTNs), whilst also campaigning to triple the number of police officers on the beat, build more social housing and improve access to 5G mobile. In May 2024, The Independent reported that a cabinet minister had written to Rishi Sunak asking that Cox become the Conservative mayoral candidate.

At the concurrent London Assembly election, Cox was Reform's second-placed candidate on the additional members list. He placed fifth with 78,865 votes (3.1%), thus losing his £10,000 deposit.

At the 2024 general election, Cox was asked by Nigel Farage to stand as the Reform UK candidate in Dover and Deal. Mike Tapp won the seat, whilst Cox placed second with 11,355 votes (23.8%).

In November 2024, Cox, along with Ben Habib, condemned comments made by Richard Tice saying that Reform wanted nothing to do with Tommy Robinson and ‘all of that lot’. Cox left the party in January 2025, saying that he had been told to “keep clear” of Robinson or else he would be removed.

By August 2025, he had been announced as a "college member" in Advance UK, a political party led by Habib. Following the deregistration of Advance UK in July 2026, Cox, when asked about Restore Britain, said that he was a "dear friend" of Rupert Lowe, but expressed concerns over racism and radicalism within the inner circle of the party.

In July 2026, he paid tribute to the late Ann Widdecombe, saying: "She should have been the second female prime minister after Margaret Thatcher."

On 18 August 2026, Cox was announced as the Restore Britain transport spokesman.

== Elections contested ==
=== House of Commons ===
Year	Constituency	Party	Votes	%	Position
2024	Dover and Deal	Reform UK	11,355	23.8	2nd

=== London mayoral elections ===
Year	Party	Votes	%	Position
2024	Reform UK	78,865	3.1	5th

=== London Assembly ===
Year	Party	Election	Votes	%	Result
2024	Reform UK	London-wide list	145,409	5.9	Not elected

== Personal life ==
Cox is married and has one child.
