= Plastic Bank =

- Company type: Privately held company
- Industry: Environment; Social Fintech; Regeneration
- Founded: 2013, in Vancouver, BC, Canada
- Founder: David Katz and Shaun Frankson
- Website: plasticbank.com

Plastic Bank is a for-profit social enterprise founded and based in Vancouver, British Columbia, that builds recycling ecosystems in under-developed communities in an effort to fight both plastic pollution in oceans, as well as high poverty levels in developing countries. The company allows people living in poverty to collect plastic and trade it for goods and services including school tuition, medical insurance, pharmaceutical access, internet access, and cooking fuel, with the aim of adding more benefits to their program in the future. Plastic Bank reprocesses collected plastics for reintroduction into the supply chain. They currently have operations in the Philippines, Indonesia, Brazil, and Egypt, with plans to expand into Colombia and Vietnam in the coming years

== History ==
Plastic Bank was founded in 2013 by David Katz and Shaun Frankson, with the vision of turning plastic waste into a form of currency to help lift underserved communities out of poverty.

The organization began its operations in Haiti in 2013, then expanded to the Philippines in 2016, followed by Indonesia in 2018 and Brazil in 2019. In 2020 Plastic Bank reached Egypt—its first expansion into the Middle East. In 2023, it launched in Thailand and developed its ecosystem in Cameroon.

Plastic Bank development timeline:

2013: First pilot collection center in Lima, Peru

2015: First full ecosystem launched in Haiti, following the success of the pilot program in Lima

2016: App development begins in partnership with IBM

2016: Expansion into the Philippines

2018: Expansion into Indonesia

2018: Partnership with SC Johnson

2019: Expansion into Brazil

2020: Expansion into Egypt

2023: Expansion into Thailand

2023: Expansion into Cameroon

== Mission ==
Gathering for prosperity

== Impact ==
Plastic Bank claims that as of April 2025, they have collected over 160,000,000 kg (160,000 long tons; 180,000 short tons) of plastic, through over 57,000 collection members in their 6 countries. The company claims that this figure for plastic is equivalent to over 8 billion plastic water bottles.

Plastic Bank also has a Community Partnership Program, which provides plastic collection facilities and education to schools and faith-based communities—helping them practice recycling from an early age.

== Awards ==
- 2023: International Green Industry Hall of Fame, Inductee
- 2023: The Globe and Mail: Report on Business Magazine, Changemakers Award (David Katz)
- 2022: Reuters Events Responsible Business Awards, Social Impact Award
- 2022: NBJ Award: Sustainability and Stewardship Award, (won in partnership with Natreve)
- 2021: Energy Globe Award, National Winner (Philippines)
- 2020: IBM Beacon Blockchain Trailblazer Award, (won in partnership with Cognition Foundry)
- 2020: SC Johnson, Sustainability Award
- 2020: Dow Packaging Innovation Award, Top Diamond Award Winner
- 2020: Meaningful Business, 100 Award Winner (David Katz)
- 2019: Sustainable Beauty Award, Best Packaging Award (Henkel)
- 2019: Packaging Europe, Best Practice Award Winner (Henkel)
- 2019: Greentech Festival, Game Changer of the Year
- 2019: EY Entrepreneur of the Year, Lifetime Achievement Award
- 2019: PAC Global Awards, Leadership Packaging Award (Henkel)
- 2019: Prix Voltaire International Award.
- 2019: Green Tech - Game Changer of the Year.
- 2019: SDG Action Award - Connector.
- 2018: Nature Inspiration Award.
- 2017: UN Momentum for Change Award (COP23).
- 2015: Sustania Community Award (COP21).
- 2014: EO Global Citizen Award.
- 2014: RCBC Environmental Award for Innovation.
