= Amy Gallagher =

British political candidate

Amy Gallagher is a British mental health nurse working in the National Health Service and as a psychotherapist.

In 2022 she sued the Tavistock and Portman NHS Foundation Trust for what she called "forcing racist ideology" on students in 2022, in reference to critical race theory.

Gallagher was the Social Democratic Party candidate for mayor in the 2024 London mayoral election. She received 1.39% of the vote, finishing seventh of the thirteen candidates. She said she stood in the election to "push back on woke ideology". While campaigning, she described the planned black out performance of the upcoming West End Slave Play as "simplistic and racist".
