= London Conservatives =

Party of the British Conservative Party that operates in London

- Leader in the London Assembly: Susan Hall
- Deputy Leader in the London Assembly: Emma Best
- Chairman: Clare Hambro
- Deputy chairpersons: Peter Smallwood & Martin Hislop
- Founded: 1946
- Preceded by: Municipal Reform Party
- Ideology: Conservatism (British); Economic liberalism; British unionism
- Political position: Centre-right to right-wing
- National affiliation: Conservatives
- Colours: Blue
- House of Commons (London Seats): 8 / 75
- London Assembly: 7 / 25
- Councillors: 405 / 1,817
- Councils controlled: 6 / 32
- Directly elected borough mayors in London: 1 / 5

Website
- City Hall Conservatives

The London Conservatives are the regional party of the Conservative Party that operates in Greater London. The party holds 8 of the 75 seats representing London in the House of Commons, 7 of the 25 seats in the London Assembly, 405 of the 1,817 London borough councillors, and 1 of the 5 directly elected borough mayors in London. Additionally, the party controls 6 of the 32 London borough councils.

== Current representatives ==
=== Members of Parliament ===
The London Conservatives won 9 of 75 London seats in the House of Commons at the 2024 United Kingdom general election. They currently hold 8 London seats after Andrew Rosindell (Romford) defected to Reform UK in January 2026. The table below shows the party's current Members of Parliament (MPs).

MP	Constituency	First elected	Majority	Majority %
Gareth Bacon	Orpington	2019	5,118	11.1%
Bob Blackman	Harrow East	2010	11,680	24.4%
Iain Duncan Smith	Chingford and Woodford Green	1992	4,758	9.8%
Peter Fortune	Bromley and Biggin Hill	2024	302	0.6%
Louie French	Old Bexley and Sidcup	2021	3,548	7.4%
Julia Lopez	Hornchurch and Upminster	2017	1,943	4.1%
Chris Philp	Croydon South	2015	2,313	4.7%
David Simmonds	Ruislip, Northwood and Pinner	2019	7,581	16.1%

=== London Assembly Members ===
The Conservatives won 8 of 25 seats at the 2024 London Assembly election. The party currently holds 7 seats after Keith Prince (Havering and Redbridge) defected to Reform UK in October 2025.

AM	Constituency	First elected	Majority	Majority %
Shaun Bailey	Additional member	2016	N/A	N/A
Emma Best	Additional member	2021	N/A	N/A
Andrew Boff	Additional member	2008	N/A	N/A
Neil Garratt	Croydon and Sutton	2021	10,294	5.6%
Alessandro Georgiou	Additional member	2024	N/A	N/A
Susan Hall	Additional member	2017 co-option	N/A	N/A
Thomas Turrell	Bexley and Bromley	2024	39,929	19.6%

=== Councillors ===
The London Conservatives won 404 of 1,817 borough seats and control of 6 of 32 boroughs at the 2022 London local elections. The party currently has 387 councillors and controls 6 boroughs, as shown in the table below.

Council	Councillors	Leader	Role in Council
Barking and Dagenham	0 / 51		Opposition
Barnet	31 / 63	Peter Zinkin	Opposition
Bexley	29 / 45	Teresa O'Neill	Overall control
Brent	11 / 57	Suresh Kansagra	Opposition
Bromley	35 / 58	Colin Smith	Overall control
Camden	3 / 55	Steve Adams	Opposition
Croydon	28 / 70	Jason Perry	Minority with Conservative mayor
Ealing	5 / 70	Julian Gallant	Opposition
Enfield	31 / 63	Alessandro Georgiou	Opposition
Greenwich	6 / 55	Matt Hartley	Opposition
Hackney	6 / 57	Michael Levy	Opposition
Hammersmith and Fulham	12 / 50	Jose Afonso	Opposition
Haringey	0 / 57		No seats
Harrow	42 / 55	Paul Osborn	Overall control
Havering	0 / 55	Damian White	Opposition
Hillingdon	30 / 53	Ian Edwards	Overall control
Hounslow	17 / 62	Joanna Biddolph	Opposition
Islington	0 / 51		No seats
Kensington and Chelsea	34 / 50	Elizabeth Campbell	Overall control
Kingston upon Thames	2 / 48	Rowena Bass	Opposition
Lambeth	0 / 63		No seats
Lewisham	0 / 54		No seats
Merton	4 / 57	Nick McLean	Opposition
Newham	0 / 66		No seats
Redbridge	5 / 63	Paul Canal	Opposition
Richmond upon Thames	0 / 54		No seats
Southwark	0 / 63		No seats
Sutton	0 / 55	Tom Drummond	Opposition
Tower Hamlets	1 / 45	Peter Golds	Opposition
Waltham Forest	14 / 60	Grace Williams	Opposition
Wandsworth	29 / 58	Ravi Govindia	Opposition
Westminster	32 / 54	Paul Swaddle	Opposition

=== Directly-elected Mayors ===
The London Conservatives won 1 of 5 directly elected borough mayors at the 2022 London local elections. The party currently has 1 mayor, as shown in the table below.

Mayoralty	Mayor	First elected	Majority	Majority %
Croydon	Jason Perry	2022	589	0.8

== Electoral performance ==
=== UK general elections ===
Blue indicates the constituencies won by the London Conservatives at the 2024 general election.

The table below shows the London Conservatives results at United Kingdom (UK) general elections since the London Government Act 1963 created the administrative area of Greater London in 1965. All UK general elections use first-past-the-post voting.

The party's best result was at the 1987 general election, when it won 58 of 84 seats in London. The London Conservatives won 9 of 75 seats at the most recent general election in 2024.

Election	Leader	Votes			Seats		Status
Election	Leader	No.	%	±	No.	±	Status
1966	Edward Heath	1,571,249	41.0	▼1.4	36 / 102	▼12	Opposition
1970	Edward Heath	1,656,829	46.6	▲5.7	47 / 102	▲11	Majority
Feb-1974	Edward Heath	1,475,196	37.6	▼9.0	42 / 92	▼5	Opposition
Oct-1974	Edward Heath	1,310,496	37.4	▼0.2	41 / 92	▼1	Opposition
1979	Margaret Thatcher	1,693,587	46.0	▲8.7	50 / 84	▲9	Majority
1983	Margaret Thatcher	1,517,154	43.9	▼2.1	56 / 84	▲6	Majority
1987	Margaret Thatcher	1,680,093	46.4	▲2.5	58 / 84	▲2	Majority
1992	John Major	1,630,546	45.4	▼1.1	48 / 84	▼10	Majority
1997	John Major	1,036,175	31.2	▼14.2	11 / 74	▼37	Opposition
2001	William Hague	841,751	30.5	▼0.7	13 / 74	▲2	Opposition
2005	Michael Howard	931,966	31.9	▲1.4	21 / 74	▲8	Opposition
2010	David Cameron	1,174,568	34.5	▲2.6	28 / 73	▲7	Cons–LD
2015	David Cameron	1,233,386	34.9	▲0.3	27 / 73	▼1	Majority
2017	Theresa May	1,268,800	33.2	▼1.7	21 / 73	▼6	Minority
2019	Boris Johnson	1,205,129	32.0	▼1.1	21 / 73	Steady	Majority
2024	Rishi Sunak	685,082	20.6	▼11.4	9 / 75	▼12	Opposition

=== European Parliament elections ===
The London Conservatives won no boroughs at the 2019 European Parliament election.

During the United Kingdom's membership of the European Union (1973–2020), Greater London participated in European Parliament elections, held every five years from 1979 until 2019. The table below shows the London Conservatives results in elections to the European Parliament. From 1979 to 1994, London members of the European Parliament (MEPs) were elected from ten individual constituencies by first-past-the-post voting; from 1999 to 2019, MEPs were elected from a London-wide regional list by proportional representation.

The London Conservatives' best result was at the first election in 1979, when they won 9 of 10 seats in London. The party's worst result was at the final election in 2019, when they won no seats.

Election	Leader	Votes			Seats		Pos.
Election	Leader	No.	%	±	No.	±	Pos.
1979	Margaret Thatcher	786,769	51.0	N/A	9 / 10	N/A	1st
1984	Margaret Thatcher	652,772	39.1	▼11.9	5 / 10	▼4	▼2nd
1989	Margaret Thatcher	671,520	35.9	▼3.3	3 / 10	▼2	2nd
1994	John Major	488,971	29.8	▼6.1	1 / 10	▼2	2nd
1999	William Hague	372,989	32.7	▲2.9	4 / 10	▲3	2nd
2004	Michael Howard	504,941	26.8	▼5.9	3 / 9	▼1	▲1st
2009	David Cameron	479,037	27.4	▲0.6	3 / 8	Steady	1st
2014	David Cameron	495,639	22.5	▼4.8	2 / 8	▼1	▼2nd
2019	Theresa May	177,964	7.9	▼14.6	0 / 8	▼2	▼5th

=== Regional elections ===
==== Greater London Council elections ====
The table below shows the results obtained by the London Conservatives in elections to the Greater London Council (GLC). The GLC was the top-tier local government administrative body for Greater London from 1965 to 1986. It replaced the earlier London County Council which had covered a much smaller area. The GLC was dissolved in 1986 by the Local Government Act 1985 and its powers were devolved to the London boroughs and other entities. All GLC elections were conducted under the first-past-the-post voting system.

The party's best result was at the 1967 GLC election, when it won 82 of 100 seats.

Election	Leader	Votes			Seats		Status
Election	Leader	No.	%	±	No.	±	Status
1964	Percy Rugg	956,543	40.1	N/A	36 / 100	N/A	Opposition
1967	Desmond Plummer	1,136,092	52.6	▲12.5	82 / 100	▲46	Majority
1970	Desmond Plummer	971,227	50.6	▼2.1	65 / 100	▼17	Majority
1973	Desmond Plummer	743,123	38.0	▼12.6	32 / 92	▼33	Opposition
1977	Horace Cutler	1,177,390	52.5	▲12.5	64 / 92	▲32	Majority
1981	Horace Cutler	894,234	39.7	▼12.8	41 / 92	▼23	Opposition

==== London Assembly elections ====
Blue indicates constituencies won by the London Conservatives at the 2024 London Assembly election. The party won three constituencies and five London-wide party list seats, for a total of eight seats.

The table below shows the London Conservatives results at London Assembly elections since the Greater London Authority was established in 2000. Assembly elections use the additional member system, a form of mixed member proportional representation, with 14 directly elected constituencies and 11 London-wide top-up seats.

The party's best result was at the 2008 London Assembly election, when it won 11 of 25 seats. The London Conservatives won 8 of 25 seats at the most recent London Assembly election in 2024.

Election	Leader	Constituency			Party			Total Seats	±
Election	Leader	No.	%	Seats	No.	%	Seats	Total Seats	±
2000	Eric Ollerenshaw	526,422	33.2	8 / 14	481,053	29.0	1 / 11	9 / 25	N/A
2004	Bob Neill	562,047	31.2	9 / 14	533,696	28.5	0 / 11	9 / 25	Steady
2008	Richard Barnes	900,569	37.4	8 / 14	835,535	34.1	3 / 11	11 / 25	▲2
2012	James Cleverly	722,280	32.7	6 / 14	708,528	32.0	3 / 11	9 / 25	▼2
2016	Gareth Bacon	812,415	31.1	5 / 14	764,230	29.2	3 / 11	8 / 25	▼1
2021	Susan Hall	833,021	32.0	5 / 14	795,081	30.7	4 / 11	9 / 25	▲1
2024	Neil Garratt	673,036	27.2	3 / 14	648,269	26.2	5 / 11	8 / 25	▼1

==== London Mayoral elections ====
Blue indicates London Assembly constituencies won by the London Conservatives at the 2024 London mayoral election.

The table below shows the London Conservatives results in London Mayoral elections since the Greater London Authority was established in 2000. Elections between 2000 and 2021 were conducted using the supplementary vote system, which allowed voters to transfer votes from first to second preference candidates. The 2024 election used the first-past-the-post system.

The London Conservatives have won two London mayoral elections: 2008 and 2012, both times with Boris Johnson as the party's candidate. The London Conservatives' best result was at the 2008 election when Johnson won 53.2% of the vote including transfers. The party won 32.7% of the vote at the most recent election in 2024.

Election	Candidate	1st Round			2nd Round			Result
Election	Candidate	No.	%	±	No.	%	±	Result
2000	Steven Norris	464,434	27.1	N/A	564,137	42.1	N/A	Lost
2004	Steven Norris	542,423	29.1	▲2.0	667,180	44.6	▲2.5	Lost
2008	Boris Johnson	1,043,761	43.2	▲14.1	1,168,738	53.2	▲8.6	Won
2012	Boris Johnson	971,931	44.0	▲0.8	1,054,811	51.5	▼1.6	Won
2016	Zac Goldsmith	909,755	35.0	▼9.0	994,614	43.2	▼8.4	Lost
2021	Shaun Bailey	893,051	35.3	▲0.2	977,601	44.8	▲1.6	Lost
2024	Susan Hall	812,397	32.7	▼2.6				Lost

=== Local elections ===
Dark blue indicates the boroughs won by the London Conservatives at the 2026 London local elections, while light blue indicates minority Conservative administrations.

The table below shows the London Conservatives results at London borough council elections since the London Government Act 1963 created the administrative area of Greater London in 1965. All borough council elections use the first-past-the-post voting system.

The party's best result was at the 1968 London local elections when it won 1,438 of 1,863 seats and overall control of 28 of 32 boroughs. The London Conservatives won 407 seats and overall control of 6 boroughs at the most recent elections in 2026.

Election	Leader	Votes			Councillors		Councils	
Election	Leader	No.	%	±	Seats	±	Majorities	±
1964	Alec Douglas-Home				668 / 1,859	N/A	9 / 32	N/A
1968	Edward Heath		60.0		1,438 / 1,863	▲770	28 / 32	▲19
1971	Edward Heath		39.4		597 / 1,863	▼841	10 / 32	▼18
1974	Edward Heath		40.8		713 / 1,867	▲116	13 / 32	▲3
1978	Margaret Thatcher		48.7		960 / 1,908	▲247	17 / 32	▲4
1982	Margaret Thatcher		42.2		984 / 1,914	▲24	17 / 32	Steady
1986	Margaret Thatcher		35.4		685 / 1,914	▼299	11 / 32	▼6
1990	Margaret Thatcher		37.8		731 / 1,914	▲46	12 / 32	▲1
1994	John Major		31.2		519 / 1,917	▼112	4 / 32	▼8
1998	William Hague		32.0		538 / 1,917	▲19	4 / 32	Steady
2002	Iain Duncan Smith		34.1		654 / 1,861	▲116	8 / 32	▲4
2006	David Cameron		34.9		785 / 1,861	▲131	14 / 32	▲6
2010	David Cameron		31.7		717 / 1,861	▼68	11 / 32	▼3
2014	David Cameron		26.4		612 / 1,861	▼105	9 / 32	▼2
2018	Theresa May		28.8		508 / 1,861	▼104	7 / 32	▼2
2022	Boris Johnson		25.9		404 / 1,817	▼104	5 / 32	▼2
2026	Kemi Badenoch		20.0		407 / 1,817	▲3	6 / 32	▲1
