= 2008 London Assembly election =

- 1 May 2008

All 25 seats in the London Assembly 13 seats needed for majority
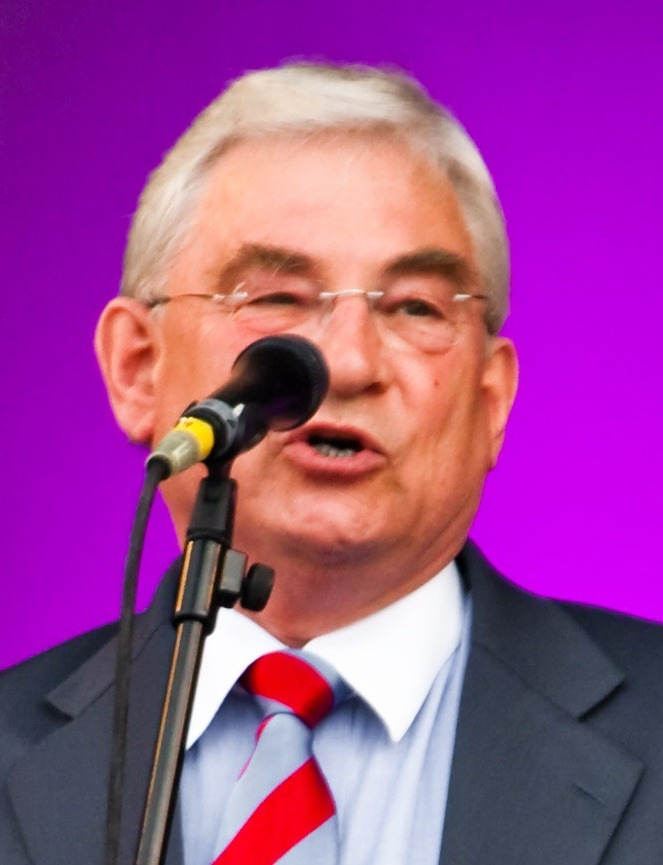

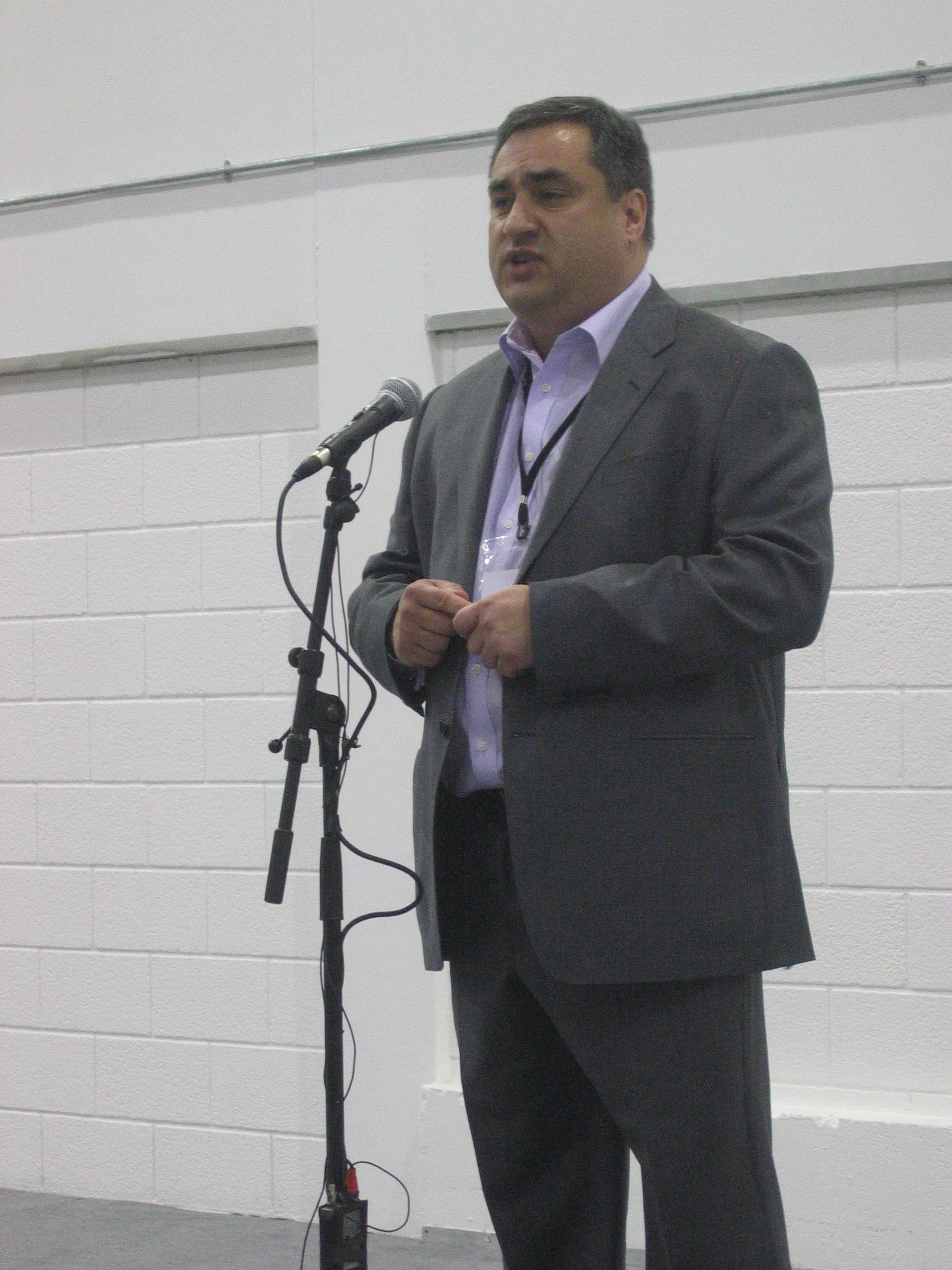

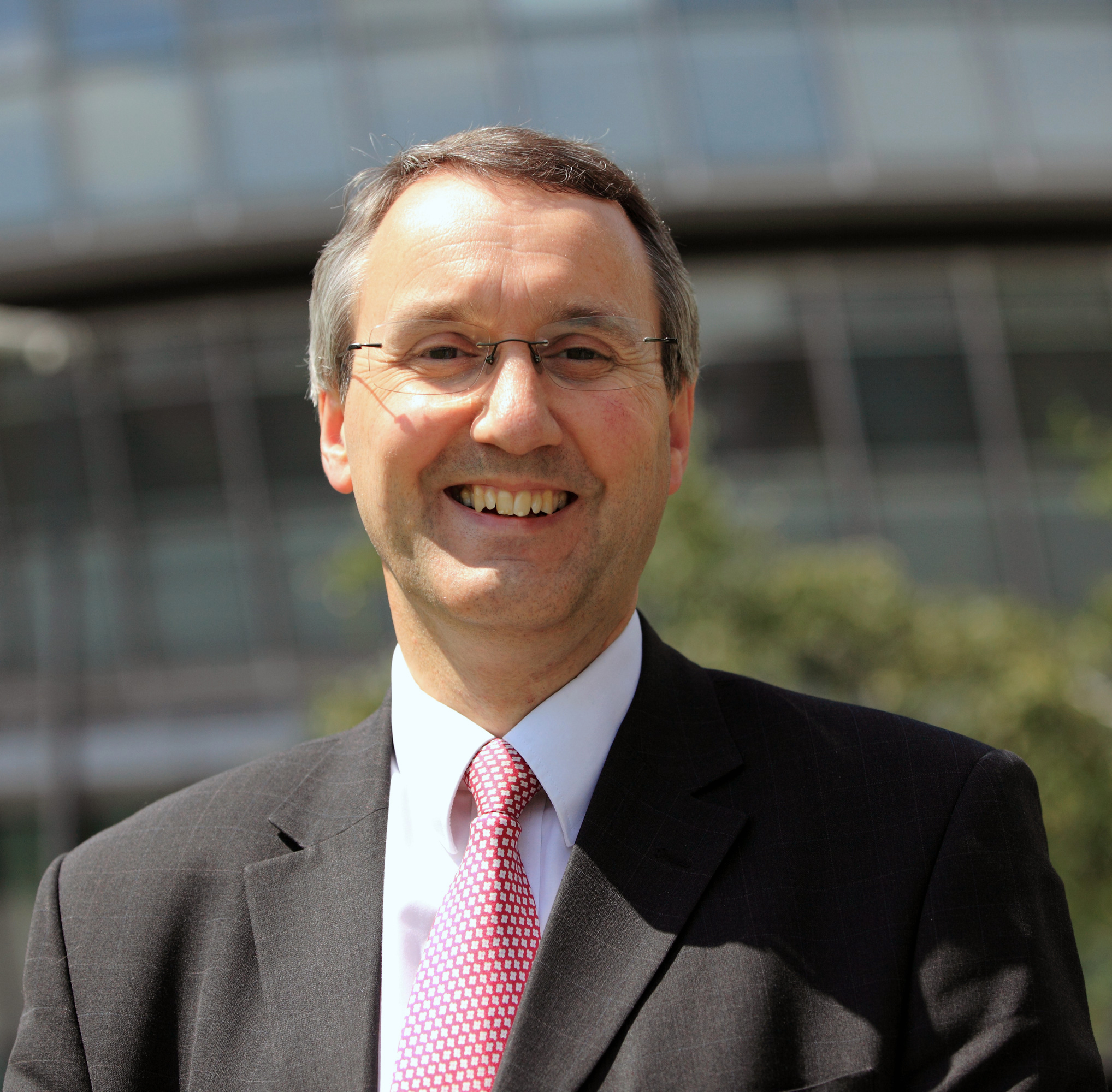

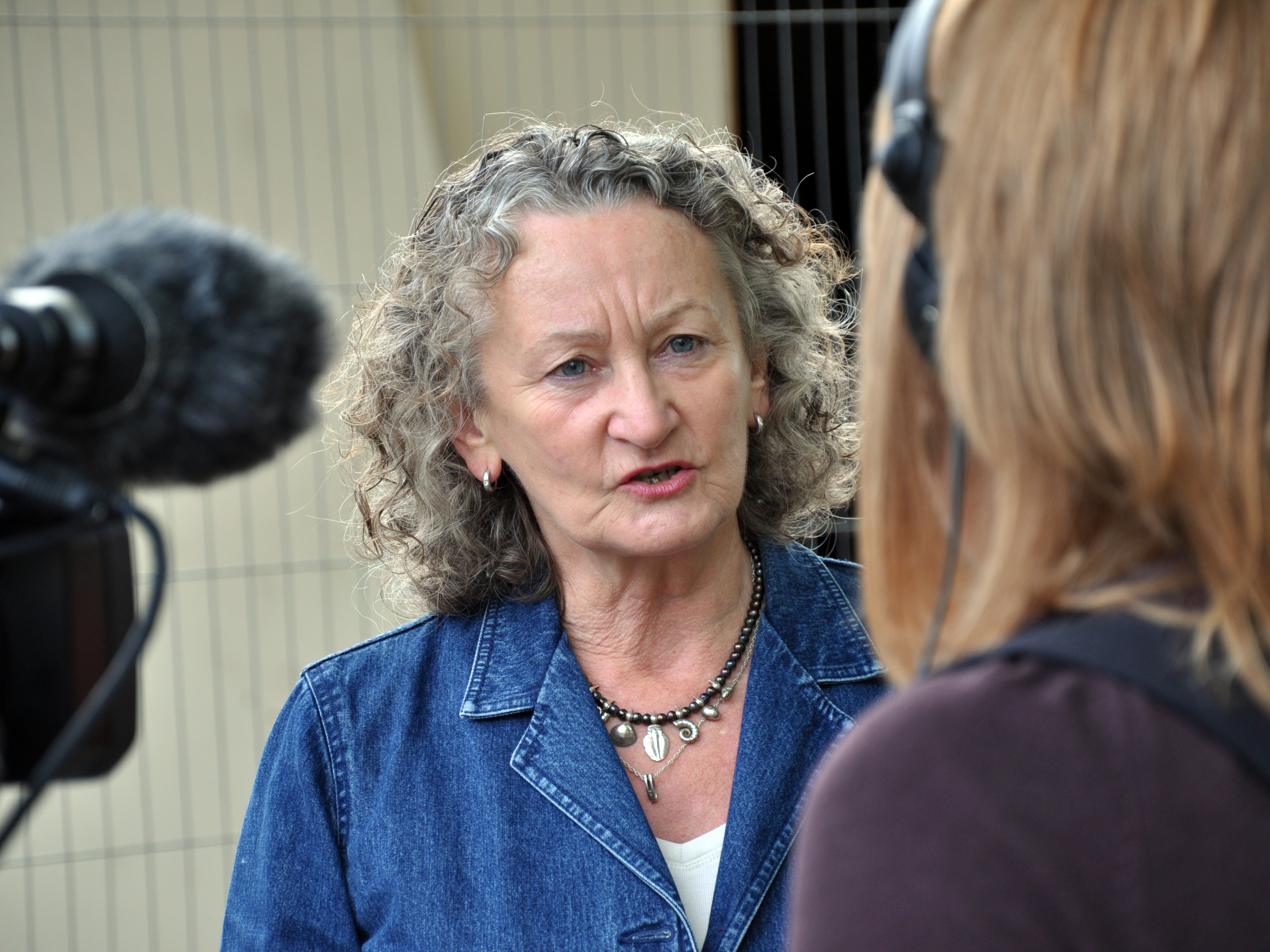

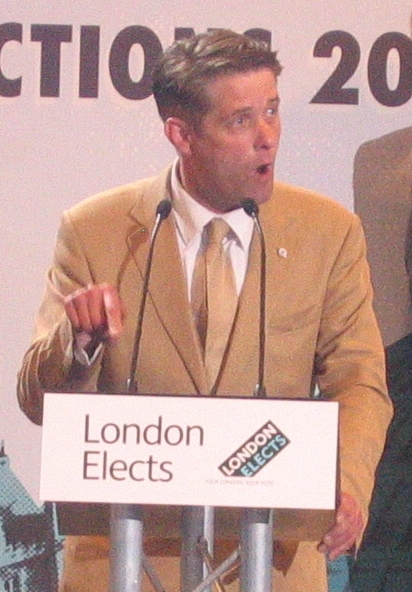
	First party	Second party
Leader	Richard Barnes	Len Duvall
Party	Conservative	Labour
Leader's seat	Ealing and Hillingdon	Greenwich and Lewisham
Last election	9 seats	7 seats
Seats won	11	8
Seat change	▲2	▲1
Constituency vote	900,569	673,855
% and swing	37.4% ▲6.2%	28.0% ▲3.3%
Party vote	835,535	665,443
% and swing	34.1% ▲6.2%	27.1% ▲2.7%
	Third party	Fourth party
Leader	Mike Tuffrey	Jenny Jones
Party	Liberal Democrats	Green
Leader's seat	Additional member	Additional member
Last election	5 seats	2 seats
Seats won	3	2
Seat change	▼2	Steady
Constituency vote	330,018	194,059
% and swing	13.7% ▼4.7%	8.1% ▲0.4%
Party vote	252,556	203,465
% and swing	11.2% ▼5.3%	8.3% ▼0.3%
	Fifth party
Leader	Richard Barnbrook
Party	BNP
Leader's seat	Additional member (Note: Not an incumbent but stood for this region and won)
Last election	0 seats
Seats won	1
Seat change	▲1
Constituency vote	18,020
% and swing	0.7% ▲0.7%
Party vote	130,714
% and swing	5.3% ▲0.6%

An election to the London Assembly took place on 1 May 2008, along with the 2008 London mayoral election. The Conservatives gained 2 seats, Labour gained one seat, the Liberal Democrats lost two seats, and UKIP were wiped out. Notably, a candidate for the British National Party (BNP) was elected for the first time.

The Assembly is elected by the Additional Member System. Fourteen directly elected constituencies exist, all of which, until 2024 were ever won by the Conservative Party or the Labour Party. An additional eleven members are allocated by a London wide top-up vote with the proviso that parties must win at least five percent of the vote to qualify for the list seats. Prior to these elections, these seats were held by five Liberal Democrats, two Labour Party members, two Green Party members and two One Londoners.

The two One London members were elected as candidates for the UK Independence Party, but then joined or supported the breakaway Veritas party and subsequently left Veritas to form One London. Compared to the previous election, two separate factions of RESPECT Unity Coalition stood in 2008: Respect (George Galloway), who supported Ken Livingstone in the mayoral election, and Left List, who supported Lindsey German (RESPECT's mayoral candidate in 2004).

== Results ==

London Assembly election, 2008
Parties	Additional member system										Total seats		
Parties	Constituency					Region					Total seats		
Parties	Votes	%	+/−	Seats	+/−	Votes	%	+/−	Seats	+/−	Total	+/−	%
Conservative	900,569	37.4	▲6.2	8	▼1	835,535	34.1	▲6.2	3	▲3	11	▲2	44.0
Labour	673,855	28.0	▲3.3	6	▲1	665,443	27.1	▲2.7	2	Steady	8	▲1	32.0
Liberal Democrats	330,018	13.7	▼4.7	0	Steady	252,556	11.2	▼5.3	3	▼2	3	▼2	12.0
Green	194,059	8.1	▲0.4	0	Steady	203,465	8.3	▼0.3	2	Steady	2	Steady	8.0
BNP	18,020	0.7	New	0	Steady	130,714	5.3	▲0.6	1	▲1	1	▲1	4.0
Christian Choice^{†}	65,357	2.7	▲0.3	0	Steady	70,294	2.9	±0.0	0	Steady	0	Steady	-
Abolish the Congestion Charge	-	-	-	-	-	63,596	2.6	New	0	Steady	0	Steady	-
Respect	26,760	1.1	▼3.5	0	Steady	59,721	2.4	▼2.1	0	Steady	0	Steady	-
UKIP	71,984	3.0	▼7.0	0	Steady	46,617	1.9	▼6.3	0	▼2	0	▼2	-
English Democrat	37,171	1.5	New	0	Steady	25,569	1.0	New	0	Steady	0	Steady	-
Left List	33,438	1.4	New	0	Steady	22,583	0.9	New	0	Steady	0	Steady	-
Unity for Peace and Socialism^{#}	-	-	-	-	-	6,394	0.3	New	0	Steady	0	Steady	-
Rathy Alagaratnam	-	-	-	-	-	3,974	0.2	N/A	0	Steady	0	Steady	-
One London	-	-	-	-	-	3,430	0.1	New	0	Steady	0	Steady	-
National Front	34,840	1.4	New	0	Steady	-	-	-	-	-	0	Steady	-
Independent	11,096	0.5	N/A	0	Steady	-	-	-	-	-	0	Steady	-
Free England	2,908	0.2	New	0	Steady	-	-	-	-	-	0	Steady	-
Animal Welfare	1,828	0.1	New	0	Steady	-	-	-	-	-	0	Steady	-
Socialist (GB)	1,588	0.1	New	0	Steady	-	-	-	-	-	0	Steady	-
Socialist	1,587	0.1	New	0	Steady	-	-	-	-	-	0	Steady	-
Communist League	701	0.0	New	0	Steady	-	-	-	-	-	0	Steady	-
Veritas	510	0.0	New	0	Steady	-	-	-	-	-	0	Steady	-
Total	2,406,289			14		2,389,891			11		25		

† Joint-ticket Christian Party/Christian Peoples Alliance candidates standing as "Christian Choice"
# Communist Party of Britain were listed on the ballot paper as "Unity for Peace and Socialism"

Constituency Vote
Conservative	37.4%
Labour	28.0%
Liberal Democrats	13.7%
Green	8.1%
Others	12.8%

Regional Vote
Conservative	34.1%
Labour	27.1%
Liberal Democrats	11.2%
Green	8.3%
BNP	5.3%
Others	12.7%

Assembly seats
Conservative	44.0%
Labour	32.0%
Liberal Democrats	12.0%
Green	8.0%
BNP	4.0%

- Total: 2,389,891
- Overall turnout: 45.28%

== Analysis ==
Labour gained Brent and Harrow from Conservative (which had been the only constituency seat changing hands in 2004, having then been gained from Labour). The other 13 constituencies remained unchanged, with the two Liberal Democrat challenges, in South West against the Conservatives, and Lambeth and Southwark against Labour, both showing swings against the Liberal Democrats. The Labour-Conservative marginal, with just 1.3% majority, of Enfield and Haringey was defended by Labour with only a tiny swing to the Conservatives. Thus the Labour campaign for the London Assembly was considerably more successful than their campaign in the local elections held on the same day.

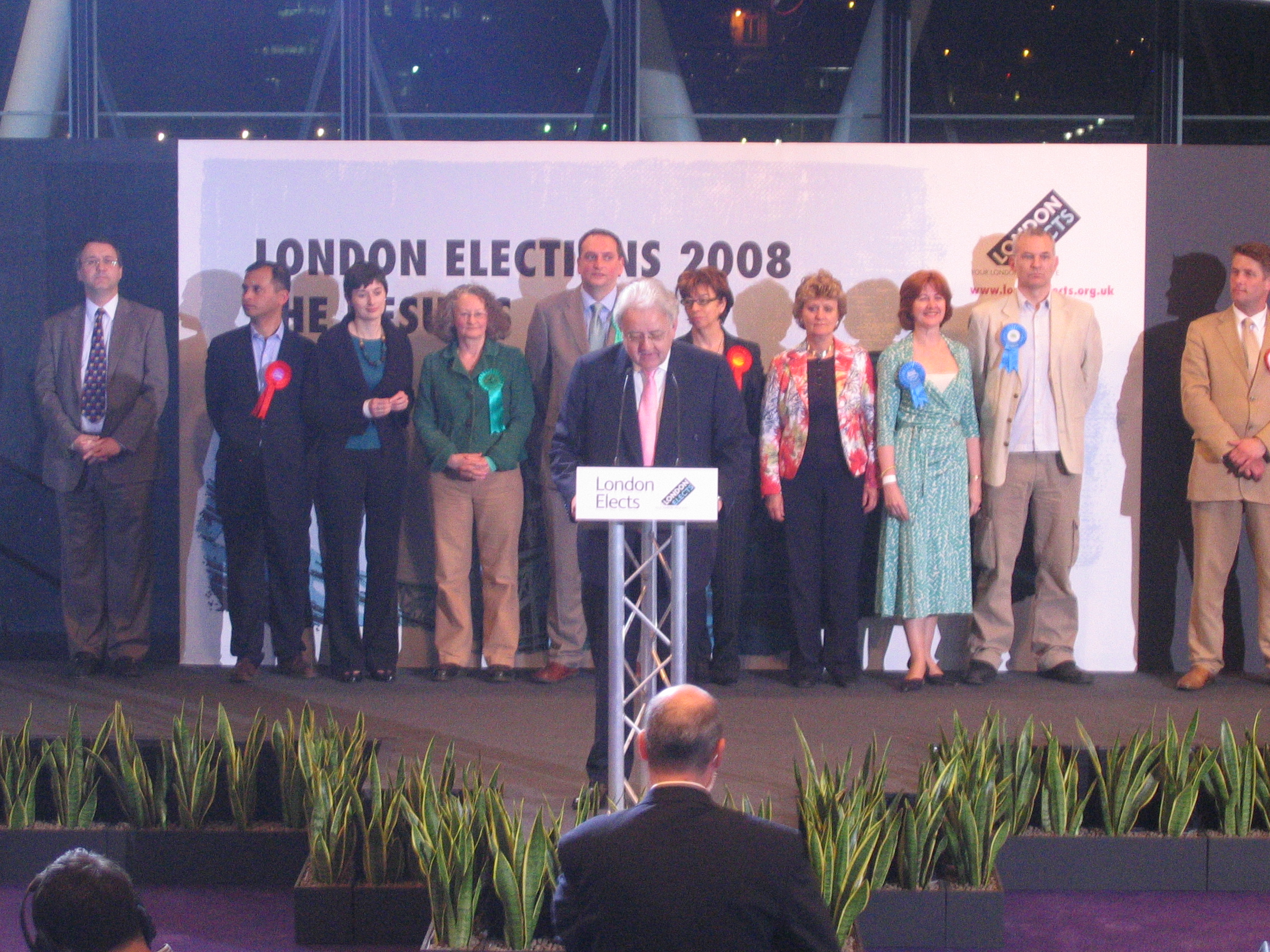
Winning list members behind the returning officer

The Liberal Democrat and UKIP vote shares were both very poor compared with 2004, with UKIP wiped out entirely, and the Liberal Democrats losing two members.

The Labour vote share was up, but because of their capture of a FPTP seat, they did not gain any extra Additional Members against 2004. The biggest vote increase was for the Conservatives, achieving the highest ever showing of any party on the list, 34%; as a result and also due to their loss of one FPTP seat, they went from zero to three additional members. The Conservative record was subsequently surpassed by Labour in 2012 (41.1%) and 2016 (40.3%).

The British National Party won their first seat on the Assembly by reaching the 5% threshold.

== London-wide list candidates ==
2008 London Assembly election: Additional members
List	Candidates	Votes	Of total (%)	± from prev.
Conservative	Andrew Boff, Victoria Borwick, Gareth Bacon, Edmond Yeo, Jane Archer, Kwasi Kwarteng, Ben Everitt, Andrew Stranack, Adrian Knowles	835,535	34.1	▲6.2
Labour	Nicky Gavron, Murad Qureshi, John Biggs, Len Duvall, Jennette Arnold, Val Shawcross, Joanne McCartney, Navin Shah, Ranjit Dheer, Balvinder Saund, Leonie Cooper, Ansuya Sodha, Shafi Khan, Alex Heslop	665,443	27.1	▲2.7
Liberal Democrats	Michael Tuffrey, Dee Doocey, Caroline Pidgeon, Jeremy Ambache, Geoff Pope, Benjamin Abbotts, Stephen Knight, Shas Sheehan, Duncan Borrowman, Monica Whyte, Merlene Emerson	252,556	11.2	▼5.3
Green	Jenny Jones, Darren Johnson, Noel Lynch, Siân Berry, Shane Collins, Laura Davenport, Shahrar Ali, Yen Chit Chong, Miranda Dunn, Adrian Oliver, Jon Nott	203,465	8.3	▼5.3
BNP	Richard Barnbrook, Robert Bailey, Julian Leppert, Roberta Woods, Dennis Pearce, Christopher Forster, Jeffrey Marshall, Clifford Le May, Lawrence Rustem, John Clarke	130,714	5.3	▼0.6
Christian Choice	Alan Craig, Paula Warren, David Campanale, Geoffrey Macharia, Stephen Hammond, Maxine Hargreaves, Sue May, Segun Johnson, Tom Conquest, Zena Sherman, Peter Vickers	70,294	2.9	±0.0
Abolish the Congestion Charge	Chris Prior	63,596	2.6	New
Respect	George Galloway, Linda Smith, Abdul Sheikh, Zakaria Abdi, Sabia Kamali, Abdurahman Jafar, Carole Swords, Hanif Abdulmuhit, John Mulrenan, Mohammed Rashid, Margot Lindsay, Anthony Collins	59,721	2.4	▼2.1
UKIP	Lawrence Webb, Kathleen Garner, Michael McGough, Ralph Atkinson, Jens Winton, Arnold Tarling, Peter Dul, John Bailey, Mick Greenhough, Jonathan Serter, Magnus Nielsen, Sunita Webb, Lynnda Robson	46,617	1.9	▼6.3
English Democrat	Roger Cooper, Steven Uncles, Leo Brookes, Sati Chaggar, Janus Polenceus, Arvind Tailor, Teresa Cannon, Johanna Munilla, Richard Castle, David Stevens, Carol White, John Dodds, Alex Vaughan, Ursula Polenceus, Kathie Broughton, John Griffiths, Liz Painter, Paul Szatmari, James Ware, Steve Scott, Nichole Vaughan, Peter Tate, Matt O'Connor	25,569	1.0	New
Left List	Lindsey German, Oliur Rahman, Rania Khan, Carole Vincent, Salvinder Dhillon, Sait Akgul, Elaine Graham-Leigh, Kumar Murshid, Glyn Robbins, Berlyne Hamilton, Katt Young, Paul Fredericks, Pat McManus, Tansy Hoskins, Mukul Hira, Pat Stack, Sultana Begum, Mujgan Kazeroonian	22,583	0.9	New
Communist	Christiane Ohsan, Pauline Fraser, Avtar Uppal, Ivan Beavis, Mohammed Khan, Jean Turner, Sarwan Singh, Harunor Rashid, Monty Goldman, Peter Latham, Philip Brand, Charlie May, Eleni Geropanagioti	6,394	0.3	New
Independent	Rathy Alagaratnam	3,974	0.2	New
One London	Damian Hockney, Peter Hulme-Cross, Robert Hough, Helena Nelson, Martin Rutter	3,430	0.1	New

== London Assembly representation ==
Party	Seats	Loss/Gain
Conservative	11	+2
Labour	8	+1
Liberal Democrats	3	–2
Green	2	0
BNP	1	+1
UKIP	0	[†] –2
Total	25	

[†] Both UKIP Assembly members had subsequently defected and formed the new One London party.

=== New members ===
- Gareth Bacon (Conservative Party, London list)
- Richard Barnbrook (British National Party (subsequently expelled from party), London list)
- Andrew Boff (Conservative Party, London list)
- Victoria Borwick (Conservative Party, London list)
- James Cleverly (Conservative Party, Bexley and Bromley)
- Kit Malthouse (Conservative Party, West Central)
- Steve O'Connell (Conservative Party, Croydon and Sutton)
- Caroline Pidgeon (Liberal Democrats, London list)
- Navin Shah (Labour Party, Brent and Harrow)
- Richard Tracey (Conservative Party, Merton and Wandsworth)

=== Defeated members ===
- Bob Blackman (Conservative Party, Brent and Harrow)
- Damian Hockney (One London, London list)
- Peter Hulme-Cross (One London, London list)
- Geoff Pope (Liberal Democrats, London list)

=== Retiring members ===
- Angie Bray (Conservative Party, West Central)
- Sally Hamwee (Liberal Democrats, London list)
- Elizabeth Howlett (Conservative Party, Merton and Wandsworth)
- Bob Neill (Conservative Party, Bexley and Bromley)
- Andrew Pelling (Conservative Party, Croydon and Sutton)
- Graham Tope (Liberal Democrats, London list)

== See also ==
- 2008 London mayoral election
- 2008 United Kingdom local elections
- Greater London Authority
- Mayor of London
- London Assembly
