= Brent and Harrow (London Assembly constituency) =

- Territorial constituency for the London Assembly
- Brent and Harrow shown within London
- Created: 2000
- Number of members: One
- Member: Krupesh Hirani
- Party: Labour
- Last election: 2024
- Next election: 2028

Brent and Harrow is a constituency represented in the London Assembly.

It consists of the combined area of the London Borough of Brent and the London Borough of Harrow. After the 2010 general election, the London Borough of Brent had two Labour MPs and one Liberal Democrat MP, and the London Borough of Harrow had two Conservative MPs and one Labour MP. Both councils are currently (April 2012) Labour controlled.

Until the 2012 election, Brent and Harrow was the only GLA constituency to have changed hands since the Assembly's formation, with Labour losing the seat to the Conservatives at the 2004 election, but regaining it at the next election in 2008.

At the 2012 election, Navin Shah became the first incumbent to successfully defend Brent and Harrow, and greatly increased his majority. At the same time two other constituencies changed hands elsewhere in London.

== Overlapping constituencies ==
The constituency covers the whole of the following UK Parliament constituencies:

- Brent West - Barry Gardiner (Labour)
- Brent East - Dawn Butler (Labour)
- Harrow East - Bob Blackman (Conservative)
- Harrow West - Gareth Thomas (Labour)

Additionally, it covers parts of the following two constituencies:

- Ruislip, Northwood and Pinner - David Simmonds (Conservative)
- Queen's Park and Maida Vale - Georgia Gould (Labour)

== Assembly members ==
| Election | Member | Party |
|---|---|---|
| 2000 | Toby Harris | Labour |
| 2004 | Bob Blackman | Conservative |
| 2008 | Navin Shah | Labour |
| 2021 | Krupesh Hirani | Labour |

== Assembly election results ==
2024 London Assembly election: Brent and Harrow
| Party | Candidate | Constituency | | | List | | |
| Party | Candidate | Votes | % | ±% | Votes | % | ±% |
|---|---|---|---|---|---|---|---|
| Labour | Krupesh Hirani | 63,867 | 40.6 | ▼5.0 | 56,844 | 36.1 | |
| Conservative | Stefan Bucovineanul-Voloseniuc | 55,039 | 35.0 | ▲1.8 | 58,139 | 36.9 | |
| Green | Nida Al-Fulaij | 15,167 | 9.6 | ▼0.6 | 13,302 | 8.4 | |
| Liberal Democrats | Jonny Singh | 12,068 | 7.7 | ▼1.0 | 9,570 | 6.1 | |
| Reform | Ian Price | 11,243 | 7.1 | ▲4.8 | 6,254 | 4.0 | |
| Rejoin EU | | | | | 3,767 | 2.4 | |
| Animal Welfare | | | | | 2,657 | 1.7 | |
| CPA | | | | | 2,049 | 1.3 | |
| Britain First | | | | | 1,599 | 1.0 | |
| SDP | | | | | 1,220 | 0.8 | |
| Independent | Farah London | | | | 747 | 0.5 | |
| Communist | | | | | 641 | 0.4 | |
| Independent | Laurence Fox | | | | 444 | 0.3 | |
| Heritage | | | | | 297 | 0.2 | |
| Independent | Gabe Romualdo | | | | 85 | 0.1 | |
| Majority | | 8,828 | 5.6 | ▼6.8 | | | |
| Valid votes | | 157,384 | | | 157,615 | | |
| Invalid votes | | 1,531 | | | 1,322 | | |
| Turnout | | 158,915 | 37.06 | | 158,937 | 37.07 | |
| Labour hold | | Swing | | | | | |

2021 London Assembly election: Brent and Harrow
| Party | Candidate | Votes | % | ±% |
|---|---|---|---|---|
| Labour | Krupesh Hirani | 77,782 | 45.6 | ▼0.1 |
| Conservative | Molly Samuel-Leport | 56,560 | 33.2 | ▼0.7 |
| Green | Emma Wallace | 17,472 | 10.2 | ▲4.5 |
| Liberal Democrats | Anton Georgiou | 14,783 | 8.7 | ▲2.1 |
| Reform | Ian Price | 3,916 | 2.3 | New |
| Majority | | 21,222 | 12.4 | ▲0.6 |
| Total formal votes | | 170,513 | | |
| Informal votes | | 3,943 | | |
| Turnout | | 170,784 | | |
| Labour hold | | Swing | | |

2016 London Assembly election: Brent and Harrow
| Party | Candidate | Votes | % | ±% |
|---|---|---|---|---|
| Labour | Navin Shah | 79,902 | 45.7 | ▼2.8 |
| Conservative | Joel Davidson | 59,147 | 33.9 | ▲5.9 |
| Liberal Democrats | Anton Georgiou | 11,534 | 6.6 | ▼4.2 |
| Green | Jafar Hassan | 9,874 | 5.7 | ▼1.6 |
| UKIP | Rathy Alagaratnam | 9,074 | 5.2 | ▼0.2 |
| Respect | Akib Mahmood | 5,170 | 3.0 | New |
| Majority | | 20,755 | 11.8 | ▼8.7 |
| Total formal votes | | 174,701 | 98.6 | ▲0.8 |
| Informal votes | | 2,506 | 1.4 | ▼0.8 |
| Turnout | | 177207 | 46.0 | ▲8.0 |
| Labour hold | | Swing | | |

2012 London Assembly election: Brent and Harrow
| Party | Candidate | Votes | % | ±% |
|---|---|---|---|---|
| Labour | Navin Shah | 70,400 | 48.5 | +11.3 |
| Conservative | Sachin Rajput | 40,604 | 28.0 | −8.2 |
| Liberal Democrats | Charlotte Henry | 15,690 | 10.8 | −1.6 |
| Green | Shahrar Ali | 10,546 | 7.3 | +0.7 |
| UKIP | Mick McGough | 7,830 | 5.4 | +3.4 |
| Majority | | 29,796 | 20.54 | +19.5 |
| Total formal votes | | 145,070 | 97.8 | |
| Informal votes | | 3,195 | 2.2 | |
| Turnout | | 148,265 | 38.0 | −5.1 |
| Labour hold | | Swing | +9.75 | |

2008 London Assembly election: Brent and Harrow
| Party | Candidate | Votes | % | ±% |
|---|---|---|---|---|
| Labour | Navin Shah | 57,716 | 36.45 | +6.45 |
| Conservative | Bob Blackman | 56,067 | 35.41 | +1.41 |
| Liberal Democrats | James Allie | 19,299 | 12.19 | –5.51 |
| Green | Shahrar Ali | 10,129 | 6.40 | +0.5 |
| Christian (CPA) | Zena Sherman | 4,180 | 2.64 | +0.34 |
| UKIP | Sunita Webb | 3,021 | 1.91 | –4.19 |
| Left List | Pat McManus | 2,287 | 1.44 | New |
| English Democrat | Arvind Tailor | 2,150 | 1.36 | New |
| Majority | | 1,649 | 1.04 | N/A |
| Turnout | | 158,330 | 43.1 | +7.8 |
| Labour gain from Conservative | | Swing | -2.52 | |

2004 London Assembly election: Brent and Harrow
| Party | Candidate | Votes | % | ±% |
|---|---|---|---|---|
| Conservative | Bob Blackman | 39,900 | 34.0 | +0.8 |
| Labour | Toby Harris | 35,214 | 30.0 | –7.6 |
| Liberal Democrats | Havard Hughes | 20,782 | 17.7 | +0.1 |
| UKIP | Daniel Moss | 7,199 | 6.1 | New |
| Green | Mohammad Ali | 6,975 | 5.9 | –3.1 |
| Respect | Albert Harriott | 4,586 | 3.9 | New |
| CPA | Gladstone Macaulay | 2,734 | 2.3 | New |
| Majority | | 4,686 | 4.0 | –0.4 |
| Turnout | | 117,390 | 35.3 | +5.9 |
| Conservative gain from Labour | | Swing | -4.25 | |

2000 London Assembly election: Brent and Harrow
| Party | Candidate | Votes | % | ±% |
|---|---|---|---|---|
| Labour | Toby Harris | 36,675 | 37.6 | N/A |
| Conservative | Bob Blackman | 32,295 | 33.2 | N/A |
| Liberal Democrats | Chris Noyce | 17,161 | 17.6 | N/A |
| Green | Simone Aspis | 8,756 | 9.0 | N/A |
| London Socialist | Austin Burnett | 2,546 | 2.6 | N/A |
| Majority | | 4,380 | 4.4 | N/A |
| Turnout | | 97,433 | 29.4 | N/A |
| Labour win (new seat) | | | | |

== Mayoral election results ==
| Year | Party | Candidate |
|---|---|---|
| 2000 | Independent | Ken Livingstone |
| 2004 | Labour | Ken Livingstone |
| 2008 | Labour | Ken Livingstone |
| 2012 | Labour | Ken Livingstone |
| 2016 | Labour | Sadiq Khan |
| 2021 | Conservative | Shaun Bailey |
| 2024 | Conservative | Susan Hall |

2024 London mayoral election (Brent and Harrow)
| Party | Candidate | Votes | % | ±% |
|---|---|---|---|---|
| Conservative | Susan Hall | 66,151 | 41.8 | N/A |
| Labour | Sadiq Khan | 58,743 | 37.2 | N/A |
| Liberal Democrats | Rob Blackie | 7,184 | 4.54 | N/A |
| Green | Zoë Garbett | 6,984 | 4.42 | N/A |
| Independent | Natalie Campbell | 4,512 | 2.85 | N/A |
| Reform | Howard Cox | 3,636 | 2.3 | N/A |
| Independent | Tarun Ghulati | 2,933 | 1.86 | N/A |
| Animal Welfare | Femy Amin | 2,158 | 1.37 | N/A |
| SDP | Amy Gallagher | 1,702 | 1.08 | N/A |
| Independent | Andreas Michli | 1,349 | 0.853 | N/A |
| Count Binface for Mayor of London | Count Binface | 1,265 | 0.8 | N/A |
| Britain First | Nick Scanlon | 982 | 0.621 | N/A |
| London Real | Brian Rose | 486 | 0.307 | N/A |
| Turnout | | 159,033 | 37.1% | −3.87% |
| Rejected ballots | | 948 | | |
| Registered electors | | 428,775 | | +0.563% |

2021 London mayoral election (Brent and Harrow)
| Party | Candidate | 1st round | | 2nd round | | | 1st round votesTransfer votes, 2nd round |
| Party | Candidate | Total | Of round | Transfers | Total | Of round | 1st round votesTransfer votes, 2nd round |
|---|---|---|---|---|---|---|---|
| Conservative | Shaun Bailey | 65,566 | 39.9% | | | | |
| Labour | Sadiq Khan | 61,778 | 37.6% | | | | |
| Green | Siân Berry | 9,378 | 5.7% | | | | |
| Liberal Democrats | Luisa Porritt | 5,853 | 3.56% | | | | |
| Independent | Niko Omilana | 5,678 | 3.45% | | | | |
| Rejoin EU | Richard Hewison | 2,186 | 1.33% | | | | |
| London Real | Brian Rose | 2,056 | 1.25% | | | | |
| Reclaim | Laurence Fox | 1,948 | 1.18% | | | | |
| Let London Live | Piers Corbyn | 1,501 | 0.913% | | | | |
| Animal Welfare | Vanessa Hudson | 1,344 | 0.817% | | | | |
| Count Binface for Mayor of London | Count Binface | 1,241 | 0.754% | | | | |
| Women's Equality | Mandu Reid | 1,017 | 0.618% | | | | |
| Independent | Farah London | 838 | 0.509% | | | | |
| UKIP | Peter John Gammons | 761 | 0.463% | | | | |
| Renew | Kam Balayev | 683 | 0.415% | | | | |
| Heritage | David Kurten | 640 | 0.389% | | | | |
| Independent | Nims Obunge | 597 | 0.363% | | | | |
| SDP | Steve Kelleher | 564 | 0.343% | | | | |
| Independent | Max Fosh | 449 | 0.273% | | | | |
| Burning Pink | Valerie Brown | 411 | 0.25% | | | | |
| Turnout | | 174,628 | 41% | | | | |
| Registered electors | | 426,373 | | | | | |

2016 London mayoral election (Brent and Harrow)
| Party | Candidate | 1st round | | 2nd round | | | 1st round votesTransfer votes, 2nd round |
| Party | Candidate | Total | Of round | Transfers | Total | Of round | 1st round votesTransfer votes, 2nd round |
|---|---|---|---|---|---|---|---|
| Labour | Sadiq Khan | 75,143 | 43.4% | | | | |
| Conservative | Zac Goldsmith | 67,042 | 38.7% | | | | |
| Green | Siân Berry | 7,333 | 4.23% | | | | |
| Liberal Democrats | Caroline Pidgeon | 6,470 | 3.74% | | | | |
| Respect | George Galloway | 3,739 | 2.16% | | | | |
| UKIP | Peter Whittle | 3,698 | 2.14% | | | | |
| Women's Equality | Sophie Walker | 2,879 | 1.66% | | | | |
| Britain First | Paul Golding | 2,184 | 1.26% | | | | |
| Cannabis is Safer than Alcohol | Lee Eli Harris | 1,652 | 0.954% | | | | |
| Independent | Prince Zylinski | 1,183 | 0.683% | | | | |
| BNP | David Furness | 1,104 | 0.637% | | | | |
| One Love | Ankit Love | 764 | 0.441% | | | | |
| Turnout | | 177,207 | 45.9% | | | | |
| Registered electors | | 385,960 | | | | | |

2012 London mayoral election (Brent and Harrow)
| Party | Candidate | 1st round | | 2nd round | | | 1st round votesTransfer votes, 2nd round |
| Party | Candidate | Total | Of round | Transfers | Total | Of round | 1st round votesTransfer votes, 2nd round |
|---|---|---|---|---|---|---|---|
| Labour | Ken Livingstone | 67,083 | 46% | | | | |
| Conservative | Boris Johnson | 58,777 | 40.3% | | | | |
| Liberal Democrats | Brian Paddick | 5,810 | 3.98% | | | | |
| Independent | Siobhan Benita | 5,152 | 3.53% | | | | |
| Green | Jenny Jones | 4,730 | 3.24% | | | | |
| UKIP | Lawrence Webb | 2,916 | 2% | | | | |
| BNP | Carlos Cortiglia | 1,405 | 0.963% | | | | |
| Turnout | | 148,684 | 38.1% | | | | |
| Registered electors | | 389,737 | | | | | |

2008 London mayoral election (Brent and Harrow)
| Party | Candidate | 1st round | | 2nd round | | | 1st round votesTransfer votes, 2nd round |
| Party | Candidate | Total | Of round | Transfers | Total | Of round | 1st round votesTransfer votes, 2nd round |
|---|---|---|---|---|---|---|---|
| Labour | Ken Livingstone | 65,862 | 42.5% | | | | |
| Conservative | Boris Johnson | 61,825 | 39.9% | | | | |
| Liberal Democrats | Brian Paddick | 14,502 | 9.36% | | | | |
| Green | Siân Berry | 4,075 | 2.63% | | | | |
| BNP | Richard Barnbrook | 2,622 | 1.69% | | | | |
| Christian Choice | Alan Craig | 2,573 | 1.66% | | | | |
| UKIP | Gerard Batten | 1,341 | 0.865% | | | | |
| Left List | Lindsey German | 1,085 | 0.7% | | | | |
| English Democrat | Matt O'Connor | 589 | 0.38% | | | | |
| Independent | Winston McKenzie | 469 | 0.303% | | | | |
| Turnout | | 158,528 | 43.2% | | | | |
| Registered electors | | 367,337 | | | | | |

2004 London mayoral election (Brent and Harrow)
| Party | Candidate | 1st round | | 2nd round | | | 1st round votesTransfer votes, 2nd round |
| Party | Candidate | Total | Of round | Transfers | Total | Of round | 1st round votesTransfer votes, 2nd round |
|---|---|---|---|---|---|---|---|
| Labour | Ken Livingstone | 48,442 | 39.7% | | | | |
| Conservative | Steve Norris | 36,947 | 30.3% | | | | |
| Liberal Democrats | Simon Hughes | 18,188 | 14.9% | | | | |
| UKIP | Frank Maloney | 5,021 | 4.12% | | | | |
| Respect | Lindsey German | 3,299 | 2.7% | | | | |
| Green | Darren Johnson | 3,256 | 2.67% | | | | |
| CPA | Ram Gidoomal | 3,222 | 2.64% | | | | |
| BNP | Julian Leppert | 2,176 | 1.78% | | | | |
| Independent | Tammy Nagalingam | 836 | 0.685% | | | | |
| Independent Working Class Action | Lorna Reid | 622 | 0.51% | | | | |
| Turnout | | 126,343 | 38% | | | | |
| Registered electors | | 332,723 | | | | | |

2000 London mayoral election (Brent and Harrow)
| Party | Candidate | 1st round | | 2nd round | | | 1st round votesTransfer votes, 2nd round |
| Party | Candidate | Total | Of round | Transfers | Total | Of round | 1st round votesTransfer votes, 2nd round |
|---|---|---|---|---|---|---|---|
| Independent | Ken Livingstone | 47,044 | 43.7% | | | | |
| Conservative | Steve Norris | 25,293 | 23.5% | | | | |
| Labour | Frank Dobson | 15,279 | 14.2% | | | | |
| Liberal Democrats | Susan Kramer | 10,797 | 10% | | | | |
| CPA | Ram Gidoomal | 2,841 | 2.64% | | | | |
| Green | Darren Johnson | 1,809 | 1.68% | | | | |
| BNP | Michael Newland | 1,362 | 1.26% | | | | |
| Independent | Ashwin Kumar | 1,200 | 1.11% | | | | |
| Pro-Motorist Small Shop | Geoffrey Ben-Nathan | 905 | 0.84% | | | | |
| UKIP | Damian Hockney | 788 | 0.731% | | | | |
| Natural Law | Geoffrey Clements | 424 | 0.394% | | | | |
| Turnout | | 110,381 | 33.3% | | | | |
| Registered electors | | 331,541 | | | | | |
