= Bexley and Bromley (London Assembly constituency) =

- Territorial constituency for the London Assembly
- Bexley and Bromley shown within London
- Created: 2000
- Number of members: One
- Member: Thomas Turrell
- Party: Conservative
- Last election: 2024
- Next election: 2028

Bexley and Bromley is a constituency represented in the London Assembly. It consists of the combined areas of the London Borough of Bexley and the London Borough of Bromley. The constituency is represented by Thomas Turrell, a Conservative, first elected in the 2024 election.

== Overlapping constituencies ==
In elections to Westminster it includes mostly, although not exclusively, Conservative-voting areas. The equivalent Westminster seats after the 2024 general election are:

- Beckenham and Penge - Liam Conlon (Labour)
- Bexleyheath and Crayford - Daniel Francis (Labour)
- Bromley and Biggin Hill - Peter Fortune (Conservative)
- Old Bexley and Sidcup - Louie French (Conservative)
- Orpington - Gareth Bacon (Conservative)
- The part of Eltham and Chislehurst that is in the London Borough of Bromley - Clive Efford (Labour)
- The part of Erith and Thamesmead that is in the London Borough of Bexley - Abena Oppong-Asare (Labour)

== Assembly members ==
Election	Member	Party
2000	Bob Neill	Conservative
2008	James Cleverly	Conservative
2016	Gareth Bacon	Conservative
2021	Peter Fortune	Conservative
2024	Thomas Turrell	Conservative

== Assembly election results ==
2024 London Assembly election: Bexley and Bromley
Party	Candidate	Constituency			List		
Party	Candidate	Votes	%	±%	Votes	%	±%
Conservative	Thomas Turrell	90,103	44.2	▼8.4	85,289	41.8	
Labour	Kevin McKenna	50,174	24.6	▼0.9	48,966	24.0	
Reform	Alan Cook	27,603	13.5	▲10.4	22,401	11.0	
Liberal Democrats	Gita Bapat	18,730	9.2	▲2.1	13,838	6.8	
Green	Marley Cornelia King	15,813	7.8	▼3.8	14,756	7.2	
Britain First					3,898	1.9	
Animal Welfare					3,351	1.6	
Rejoin EU					3,329	1.6	
SDP					1,963	1.0	
CPA					1,924	0.9	
Independent	Laurence Fox				1,601	0.8	
Communist					540	0.3	
Heritage					388	0.2	
Independent	Farah London				323	0.2	
Independent	Gabe Romualdo				66	0.0	
Majority		39,929	19.6	▼7.5			
Valid votes		202,423			202,633		
Invalid votes		1,481			1,268		
Turnout		203,904	48.3	▲4.3	203,901	48.3	
Conservative hold		Swing		▼3.8			

2021 London Assembly election: Bexley and Bromley
Party	Candidate	Votes	%	±%
Conservative	Peter Fortune	97,966	52.6	▲6.5
Labour	Stef Borella	47,389	25.5	▲1.4
Green	Mary Ion	21,600	11.6	▲4.9
Liberal Democrats	Allan Tweddle	13,305	7.1	▲0.7
Reform	Michael Pastor	5,861	3.1	New
Majority		50,577	27.1	▲5.1
Total formal votes		186,121		
Informal votes		3,213		
Turnout		189,334		
Conservative hold		Swing		

2016 London Assembly election: Bexley and Bromley
Party	Candidate	Votes	%	±%
Conservative	Gareth Bacon	87,460	46.1	▼6.5
Labour	Sam Russell	45,791	24.1	▼0.1
UKIP	Frank Gould	30,485	16.1	▲9.7
Green	Roisin Robertson	12,685	6.7	▲1.2
Liberal Democrats	Julie Ireland	12,145	6.4	▼0.4
All People's Party	Veronica Obadara	1,243	0.7	New
Majority		41,669	22.0	▼6.4
Total formal votes		189,809	99.1	▲0.4
Informal votes		1,693	0.9	▼0.4
Turnout		191,502	47.0	▲9.0
Conservative hold		Swing		

2012 London Assembly election: Bexley and Bromley
Party	Candidate	Votes	%	±%
Conservative	James Cleverly	88,482	52.6	0.0
Labour	Josie Channer	40,714	24.2	+9.7
Liberal Democrats	Sam Webber	11,396	6.8	−3.8
UKIP	David Coburn	10,771	6.4	+2.4
Green	Jonathan Rooks	9,209	5.5	+0.9
BNP	Donna Treanor	7,563	4.5	New
Majority		47,768	28.4	−9.7
Total formal votes		168,135	98.7	
Informal votes		2,240	1.3	
Turnout		170,375	38.0	−11.1
Conservative hold		Swing	-4.6	

2008 London Assembly election: Bexley and Bromley
Party	Candidate	Votes	%	±%
Conservative	James Cleverly	105,162	52.6	+12.2
Labour	Alex Heslop	29,925	14.5	−1.1
Liberal Democrats	Tom Papworth	21,244	10.6	–8.3
National Front	Paul Winnett	11,288	5.6	New
Green	Ann Garrett	9,261	4.6	–0.5
UKIP	Mick Greenhough	8,021	4.0	–12.8
Independents to Save Queen Mary's Hospital	John Hemming-Clark	6,684	3.3	New
Christian (CPA)	Miranda Suit	4,408	2.2	–0.1
English Democrat	Steven Uncles	2,907	1.5	New
Left List	David Davis	1,050	0.5	New
Majority		75,237	38.1	+16.6
Turnout		199,950	49.1	
Conservative hold		Swing	+4.5	

2004 London Assembly election: Bexley and Bromley
Party	Candidate	Votes	%	±%
Conservative	Bob Neill	64,246	40.4	−6.8
Liberal Democrats	Duncan Borrowman	29,992	18.9	−2.7
UKIP	Heather Bennett	26,703	16.8	New
Labour	Charlie Mansell	24,848	15.6	−6.5
Green	Ann Garrett	8,069	5.1	−3.0
CPA	Miranda Suit	3,397	2.1	New
Respect	Alun Morinan	1,673	1.1	New
Majority		32,254	21.5	−3.6
Turnout		158,928		
Conservative hold		Swing		

2000 London Assembly election: Bexley and Bromley
Party	Candidate	Votes	%	±%
Conservative	Bob Neill	64,879	47.2	N/A
Labour	Charlie Mansell	30,320	22.1	N/A
Liberal Democrats	Duncan Borrowman	29,710	21.6	N/A
Green	Ian Jardin	11,124	8.1	N/A
London Socialist	Jean Kysow	1,403	1.0	N/A
Majority		34,559	25.1	N/A
Turnout		137,436	35.3	N/A
Conservative hold		Swing	N/A	

== Mayoral election results ==
Below are the results for the candidate who received the highest share of the popular vote in the constituency at each mayoral election.

Year	Party	Candidate
2000	Conservative	Steve Norris
2004	Conservative	Steve Norris
2008	Conservative	Boris Johnson
2012	Conservative	Boris Johnson
2016	Conservative	Zac Goldsmith
2021	Conservative	Shaun Bailey
2024	Conservative	Susan Hall

2024 London mayoral election (Bexley and Bromley)
Party	Candidate	Votes	%	±%
Conservative	Susan Hall	111,216	54.6	N/A
Labour	Sadiq Khan	48,952	24.1	N/A
Liberal Democrats	Rob Blackie	10,111	4.97	N/A
Reform	Howard Cox	9,243	4.54	N/A
Green	Zoë Garbett	8,600	4.23	N/A
SDP	Amy Gallagher	3,710	1.82	N/A
Independent	Natalie Campbell	2,727	1.34	N/A
Britain First	Nick Scanlon	2,174	1.07	N/A
Animal Welfare	Femy Amin	1,899	0.933	N/A
Count Binface for Mayor of London	Count Binface	1,827	0.898	N/A
Independent	Andreas Michli	1,513	0.743	N/A
Independent	Tarun Ghulati	1,194	0.587	N/A
London Real	Brian Rose	342	0.168	N/A
Turnout		204,058	48.4%	+3.68%
Rejected ballots		550		
Registered electors		421,800		−0.496%

2021 London mayoral election (Bexley and Bromley)
Party	Candidate	1st round		2nd round			1st round votesTransfer votes, 2nd round
Party	Candidate	Total	Of round	Transfers	Total	Of round	1st round votesTransfer votes, 2nd round
Conservative	Shaun Bailey	100,630	54.6%				
Labour	Sadiq Khan	44,350	24.1%				
Green	Siân Berry	12,236	6.64%				
Liberal Democrats	Luisa Porritt	6,225	3.38%				
Reclaim	Laurence Fox	5,461	2.97%				
Independent	Niko Omilana	2,000	1.09%				
Count Binface for Mayor of London	Count Binface	1,861	1.01%				
UKIP	Peter John Gammons	1,740	0.945%				
London Real	Brian Rose	1,459	0.792%				
Rejoin EU	Richard Hewison	1,219	0.662%				
Women's Equality	Mandu Reid	1,184	0.643%				
Animal Welfare	Vanessa Hudson	1,133	0.615%				
Heritage	David Kurten	1,099	0.597%				
Let London Live	Piers Corbyn	770	0.418%				
SDP	Steve Kelleher	657	0.357%				
Independent	Nims Obunge	617	0.335%				
Renew	Kam Balayev	476	0.258%				
Independent	Farah London	470	0.255%				
Independent	Max Fosh	321	0.174%				
Burning Pink	Valerie Brown	233	0.127%				
Turnout		189,495	44.7%				
Registered electors		423,901					

2016 London mayoral election (Bexley and Bromley)
Party	Candidate	1st round		2nd round			1st round votesTransfer votes, 2nd round
Party	Candidate	Total	Of round	Transfers	Total	Of round	1st round votesTransfer votes, 2nd round
Conservative	Zac Goldsmith	97,433	51.7%				
Labour	Sadiq Khan	48,134	25.5%				
UKIP	Peter Whittle	14,764	7.83%				
Liberal Democrats	Caroline Pidgeon	8,924	4.73%				
Green	Siân Berry	8,508	4.51%				
Britain First	Paul Golding	3,575	1.9%				
Women's Equality	Sophie Walker	2,933	1.55%				
Respect	George Galloway	1,454	0.771%				
BNP	David Furness	1,210	0.641%				
Cannabis is Safer than Alcohol	Lee Eli Harris	1,090	0.578%				
Independent	Prince Zylinski	373	0.198%				
One Love	Ankit Love	226	0.12%				
Turnout		191,514	47.4%				
Registered electors		404,329					

2012 London mayoral election (Bexley and Bromley)
Party	Candidate	1st round		2nd round			1st round votesTransfer votes, 2nd round
Party	Candidate	Total	Of round	Transfers	Total	Of round	1st round votesTransfer votes, 2nd round
Conservative	Boris Johnson	104,944	62.5%				
Labour	Ken Livingstone	37,520	22.3%				
UKIP	Lawrence Webb	5,810	3.46%				
Liberal Democrats	Brian Paddick	5,748	3.42%				
Independent	Siobhan Benita	5,606	3.34%				
Green	Jenny Jones	4,898	2.91%				
BNP	Carlos Cortiglia	3,507	2.09%				
Turnout		170,591	38.1%				
Registered electors		447,465					

2008 London mayoral election (Bexley and Bromley)
Party	Candidate	1st round		2nd round			1st round votesTransfer votes, 2nd round
Party	Candidate	Total	Of round	Transfers	Total	Of round	1st round votesTransfer votes, 2nd round
Conservative	Boris Johnson	122,052	60.8%				
Labour	Ken Livingstone	40,670	20.3%				
Liberal Democrats	Brian Paddick	17,332	8.63%				
BNP	Richard Barnbrook	8,950	4.46%				
Green	Siân Berry	3,830	1.91%				
UKIP	Gerard Batten	2,904	1.45%				
Christian Choice	Alan Craig	2,884	1.44%				
English Democrat	Matt O'Connor	1,156	0.576%				
Left List	Lindsey German	670	0.334%				
Independent	Winston McKenzie	306	0.152%				
Turnout		203,146	49.9%				
Registered electors		407,003					

2004 London mayoral election (Bexley and Bromley)
Party	Candidate	1st round		2nd round			1st round votesTransfer votes, 2nd round
Party	Candidate	Total	Of round	Transfers	Total	Of round	1st round votesTransfer votes, 2nd round
Conservative	Steve Norris	59,521	37%				
Labour	Ken Livingstone	40,983	25.5%				
Liberal Democrats	Simon Hughes	28,232	17.5%				
UKIP	Frank Maloney	16,990	10.6%				
BNP	Julian Leppert	6,859	4.26%				
Green	Darren Johnson	3,262	2.03%				
CPA	Ram Gidoomal	3,200	1.99%				
Respect	Lindsey German	965	0.6%				
Independent Working Class Action	Lorna Reid	611	0.38%				
Independent	Tammy Nagalingam	327	0.203%				
Turnout		164,715	41.5%				
Registered electors		397,075					

2000 London mayoral election (Bexley and Bromley)
Party	Candidate	1st round		2nd round			1st round votesTransfer votes, 2nd round
Party	Candidate	Total	Of round	Transfers	Total	Of round	1st round votesTransfer votes, 2nd round
Conservative	Steve Norris	57,193	39.3%				
Independent	Ken Livingstone	41,679	28.7%				
Liberal Democrats	Susan Kramer	20,610	14.2%				
Labour	Frank Dobson	11,975	8.24%				
BNP	Michael Newland	3,785	2.6%				
CPA	Ram Gidoomal	3,678	2.53%				
Green	Darren Johnson	2,673	1.84%				
UKIP	Damian Hockney	2,149	1.48%				
Pro-Motorist Small Shop	Geoffrey Ben-Nathan	746	0.513%				
Independent	Ashwin Kumar	617	0.424%				
Natural Law	Geoffrey Clements	286	0.197%				
Turnout		147,893	37.9%				
Registered electors		389,790					
