= Thomas Turrell =

British Conservative politician

Thomas Turrell AM
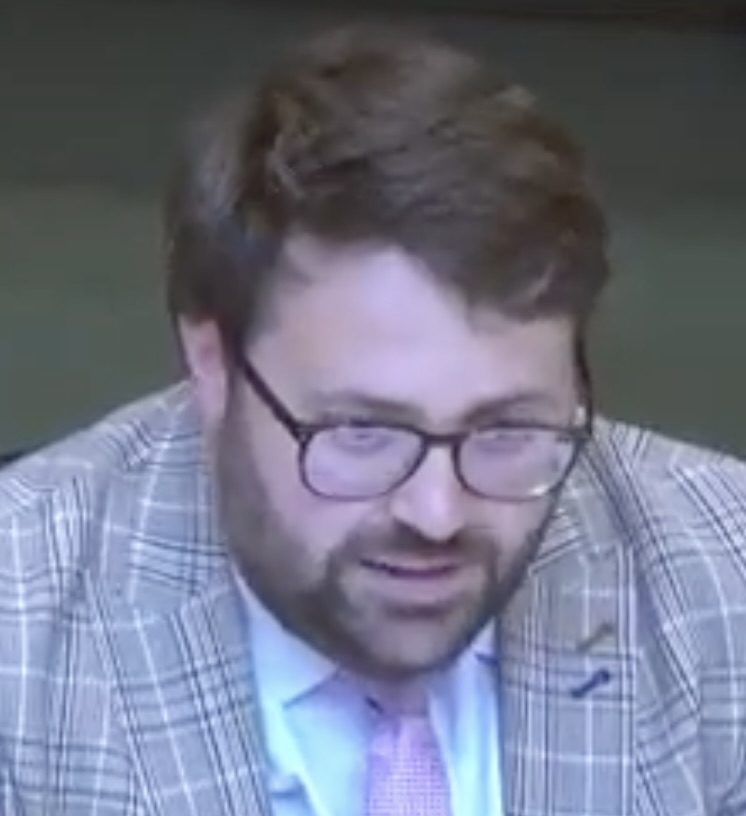
- Turrell in July 2024

Member of the London Assembly for Bexley and Bromley
- Incumbent
- Assumed office 6 May 2024
- Preceded by: Peter Fortune
- Majority: 39,929 (19.6%)

Personal details
- Party: Conservative

Thomas Frederick Turrell is a British Conservative politician, serving as the Member of the London Assembly (AM) for Bexley and Bromley since 2024.

== Political career ==
He was elected as a Councillor for Hayes and Coney Hall Ward on Bromley London Borough Council in May 2022 before standing down at the local elections in 2026.

He was the Conservative candidate for Greenwich and Woolwich in the 2019 general election, losing to Labour MP Matthew Pennycook.
