= London Assembly =

Elected body in London, England

- Coat of arms of the Greater London Authority

- Wordmark

Type
- Type: Unicameral deliberative assembly of London

History
- Founded: 3 July 2000

Leadership
- Chair: Andrew Boff, Independent since 11 May 2026
- Deputy Chair: Len Duvall, Labour since 11 May 2026
- Group leaders: Len Duvall, Labour; Susan Hall, Conservative; Caroline Russell, Green; Hina Bokhari, Liberal Democrat; Alex Wilson, Reform UK

Structure
- Seats: 25
- Graph of the party split among 25 seats.
- Political groups: Labour (11) (Note: Includes 10 Labour Co-op AMs.); Conservative (6); Green (3); Liberal Democrats (2); Reform UK (2); Independent (1)
- Committees: List: Audit; Budget and Performance; Budget Monitoring; Confirmation Hearings; Economy; Education; Environment; GLA Oversight; Health; Housing; Planning; Police and Crime; Regeneration; Transport

Elections
- Voting system: Additional-member system (Mixed-member proportional representation)
- Last election: 2 May 2024
- Next election: 4 May 2028

Meeting place
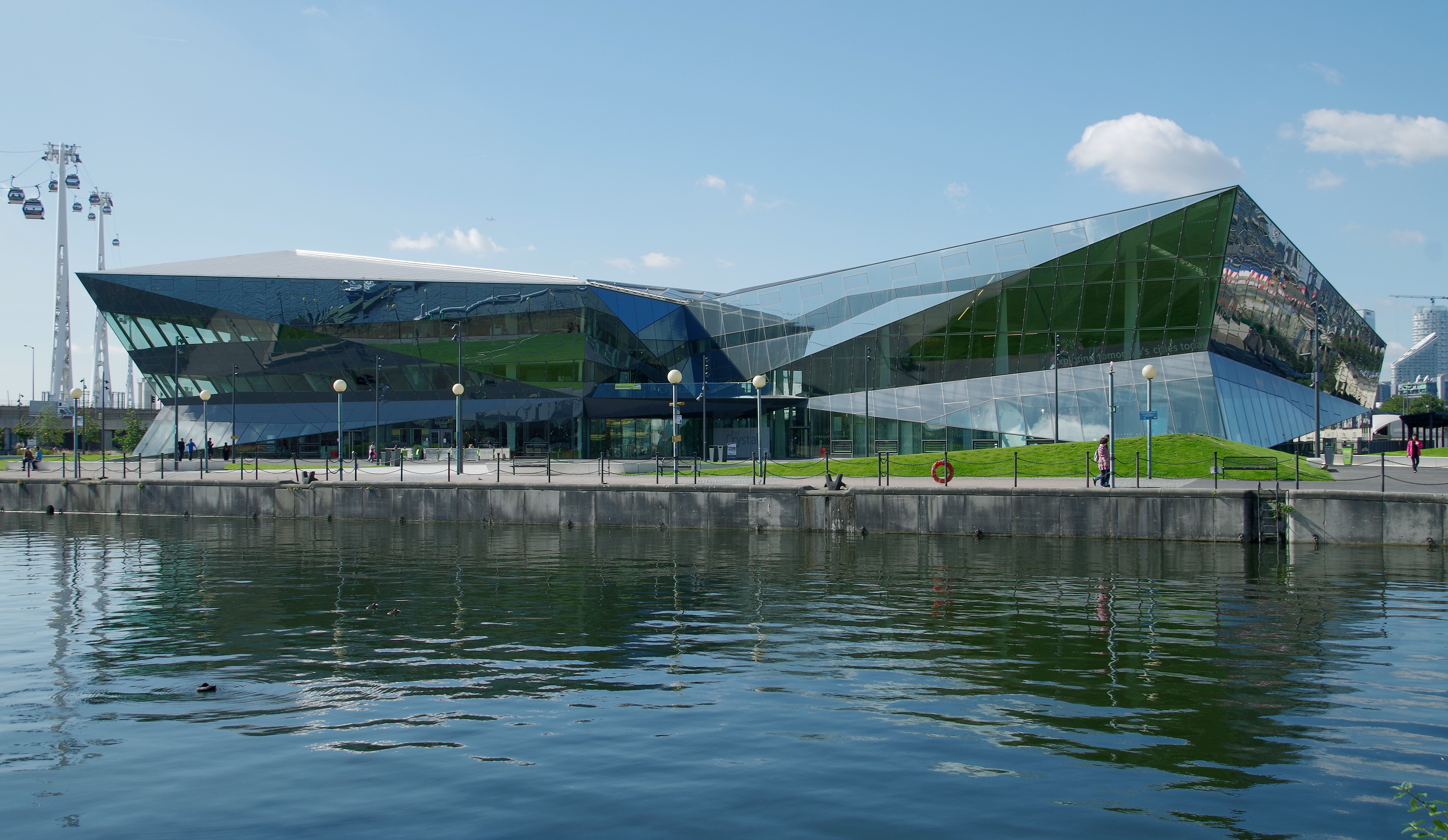
- City Hall, Newham, London
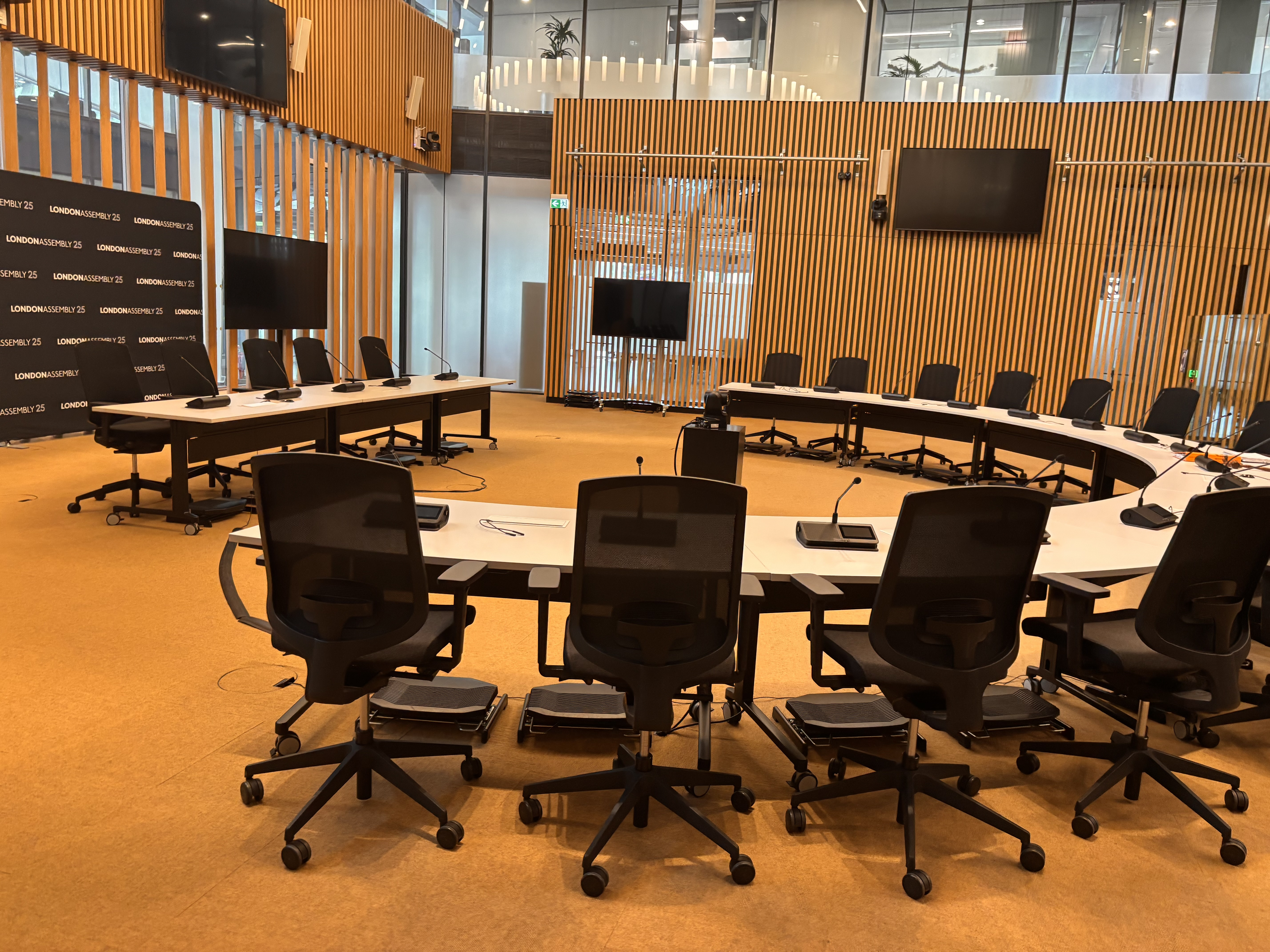
- London Assembly chamber

Website
- london.gov.uk

The London Assembly is a 25-member elected body, part of the Greater London Authority, that scrutinises the activities of the mayor of London and has the power, with a two-thirds supermajority, to amend the mayor's annual budget and to reject the mayor's draft statutory strategies. The London Assembly was established in 2000. It is also able to investigate other issues of importance to Londoners, publish its findings and recommendations, and make proposals to the mayor.

== Assembly members ==
The Assembly comprises 25 members elected using the additional-member system or mixed-member proportional representation system. A majority in the chamber (usually 13) is needed to pass measures. Elections take place every four years, at the same time as those for the mayor of London. London is divided into 14 geographical constituencies, each electing one member. Each voter casts two votes – one for election of the local member; the other as a party vote. A further 11 members are elected from party lists in such as way as to give each substantial party a share of seats that approximates the party's share of the party votes cast across the whole of London. The 11 seats are allocated using a modified D'Hondt allocation. A party must win at least 5% of the party list vote in order to win any seats. Members of the London Assembly have the post-nominal title "AM" (assembly member). The annual salary for a London Assembly member is approximately £60,416.

=== Former Assembly members ===
Since its creation in 2000, sixteen Assembly members subsequently were elected to the House of Commons: David Lammy, Meg Hillier, Diana Johnson, and Florence Eshalomi for Labour; Andrew Pelling, Bob Neill, Angie Bray, Bob Blackman, Eric Ollerenshaw, Victoria Borwick, James Cleverly, Kit Malthouse, Kemi Badenoch, Gareth Bacon and Peter Fortune for the Conservatives; Lynne Featherstone for the Liberal Democrats; and Siân Berry for the Green Party.

One Assembly member, Jenny Jones, was elevated to the House of Lords as the Green Party's first life peer in 2013, continuing to sit in the Assembly until May 2016. Sally Hamwee, Graham Tope, and Toby Harris were already peers when elected to the assembly, while Lynne Featherstone and Dee Doocey were created life peers after standing down from the Assembly.

Val Shawcross, AM for Lambeth and Southwark, unsuccessfully contested Bermondsey and Old Southwark as the Labour parliamentary candidate at the 2010 general election, and Navin Shah stood unsuccessfully as the Labour candidate for Harrow East in 2017. Andrew Dismore, Graham Tope, and the late Richard Tracey are all former MPs later elected to the assembly. John Biggs, formerly AM for City and East, served as the directly elected mayor of Tower Hamlets from 2015 until 2022.

=== Structure of the assembly ===
London Assembly elections have been held under the additional member system, with a set number of constituencies elected on a first-past-the-post system and a set number London-wide on a closed party list system. Terms are for four years, so despite the delayed 2020 election, which was held in 2021, the following election was held in 2024.

In December 2016, an Electoral Reform Bill was introduced which would have changed the election system to first-past-the-post. At the 2017 general election, the Conservative Party manifesto proposed changing how the Assembly is elected to first-past-the-post.

However, after the general election of 2017, which resulted in a hung Parliament with the Conservatives and the Democratic Unionist Party in a confidence and supply arrangement, no action was taken with regard to the electoral arrangements of the London Assembly, and the 2020 election, delayed to 2021 due to the COVID-19 pandemic, was held on the current electoral system of AMS (constituencies and regional lists).

| Political party | Assembly members elected | | | | | | | |
| Political party | 2000 | 2004 | 2008 | 2012 | 2016 | 2021 | 2024 | |
|---|---|---|---|---|---|---|---|---|
| Labour | 9 | 7 | 8 | 12 | 12 | 11 | 11 | 11 / 25 |
| Conservative | 9 | 9 | 11 | 9 | 8 | 9 | 8 | 8 / 25 |
| Green | 3 | 2 | 2 | 2 | 2 | 3 | 3 | 3 / 25 |
| Liberal Democrat | 4 | 5 | 3 | 2 | 1 | 2 | 2 | 2 / 25 |
| Reform UK | | | | | | 0 | 1 | 1 / 25 |
| UKIP | 0 | 2 | 0 | 0 | 2 | 0 | | |
| BNP | 0 | 0 | 1 | 0 | 0 | | | |

On 12 December 2018, following Peter Whittle's departure from UKIP, he and David Kurten disbanded the UKIP grouping and formed the Brexit Alliance group.

In March 2019, following the departure of Tom Copley and Fiona Twycross to take up full-time Deputy Mayor roles, Murad Qureshi and Alison Moore replaced them as Labour Assembly members. The end of the term in office for AMs was extended from May 2020 to May 2021, as no elections were being held during the COVID-19 pandemic.

=== List of current Assembly members ===
| Constituency | Member | Political party |
|---|---|---|
| Barnet and Camden | Anne Clarke | Labour Co-op |
| Bexley and Bromley | Thomas Turrell | Conservative |
| Brent and Harrow | Krupesh Hirani | Labour Co-op |
| City and East | Unmesh Desai | Labour Co-op |
| Croydon and Sutton | Neil Garratt | Conservative |
| Ealing and Hillingdon | Bassam Mahfouz | Labour |
| Enfield and Haringey | Joanne McCartney | Labour Co-op |
| Greenwich and Lewisham | Len Duvall | Labour Co-op |
| Havering and Redbridge | Keith Prince (Note: Keith Prince was elected as a Conservative and defected to Reform UK in 2025.) | Reform |
| Lambeth and Southwark | Marina Ahmad | Labour Co-op |
| Merton and Wandsworth | Leonie Cooper | Labour Co-op |
| North East | Sem Moema | Labour Co-op |
| South West | Gareth Roberts | Liberal Democrats |
| West Central | James Small-Edwards | Labour Co-op |
| Additional members London-wide | Benali Hamdache | Green |
| Additional members London-wide | Susan Hall | Conservative |
| Additional members London-wide | Alex Wilson | Reform |
| Additional members London-wide | Caroline Russell | Green |
| Additional members London-wide | Shaun Bailey | Conservative |
| Additional members London-wide | Emma Best | Conservative |
| Additional members London-wide | Hina Bokhari | Liberal Democrats |
| Additional members London-wide | Zack Polanski | Green |
| Additional members London-wide | Andrew Boff (Note: Andrew Boff was elected as a Conservative but resigned from the party to sit as an independent in October 2026.) | Independent |
| Additional members London-wide | Elly Baker | Labour Co-op |
| Additional members London-wide | Alessandro Georgiou | Conservative |

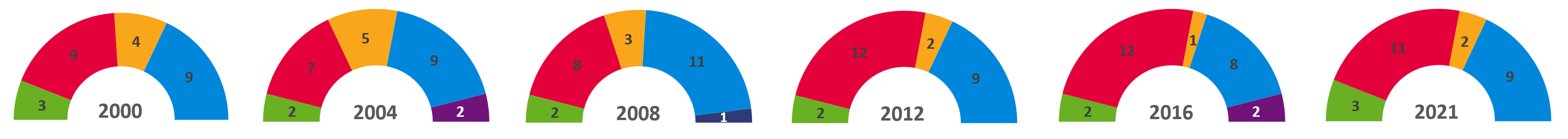
Composition of London Assembly, 2000–2021 Green Party Labour Party Liberal Democrats Conservative Party UKIP BNP

== List of chairs of the London Assembly ==
Chairs of the assembly
| Name | Entered office | Left office | Political party |
|---|---|---|---|
| Trevor Phillips | May 2000 | May 2001 | Labour |
| Sally Hamwee | May 2001 | May 2002 | Liberal Democrats |
| Trevor Phillips | May 2002 | February 2003 | Labour |
| Sally Hamwee | February 2003 | May 2004 | Liberal Democrats |
| Brian Coleman | May 2004 | May 2005 | Conservative |
| Sally Hamwee | May 2005 | May 2006 | Liberal Democrats |
| Brian Coleman | May 2006 | May 2007 | Conservative |
| Sally Hamwee | May 2007 | May 2008 | Liberal Democrats |
| Jennette Arnold | May 2008 | May 2009 | Labour |
| Darren Johnson | May 2009 | May 2010 | Green |
| Dee Doocey | May 2010 | May 2011 | Liberal Democrats |
| Jennette Arnold | May 2011 | May 2013 | Labour |
| Darren Johnson | May 2013 | May 2014 | Green |
| Roger Evans | May 2014 | May 2015 | Conservative |
| Jennette Arnold | May 2015 | May 2016 | Labour |
| Tony Arbour | May 2016 | May 2017 | Conservative |
| Jennette Arnold | May 2017 | May 2018 | Labour |
| Tony Arbour | May 2018 | May 2019 | Conservative |
| Jennette Arnold | May 2019 | May 2020 | Labour |
| Navin Shah | May 2020 | May 2021 | Labour |
| Andrew Boff | May 2021 | May 2022 | Conservative |
| Onkar Sahota | May 2022 | May 2023 | Labour |
| Andrew Boff | May 2023 | May 2025 | Conservative |
| Len Duvall | May 2025 | May 2026 | Labour |
| Andrew Boff | May 2026 | Incumbent | Conservative |
| Andrew Boff | October 2026 | Incumbent | Independent |

== Committees ==
The Assembly has formed the following committees:

- Audit Panel, chaired by Neil Garratt
- Budget and Performance Committee, chaired by Neil Garratt
- Confirmation Hearings Committee, which has no chair
- Devolution Working Group, chaired by Bassam Mahfouz
- Economy, Culture and Skills Committee, chaired by Bassam Mahfouz
- Environment Committee, chaired by Gareth Roberts
- Fire Committee, chaired by Anne Clarke
- GLA Oversight Committee, chaired by Emma Best
- Health Committee, chaired by Krupesh Hirani
- Housing Committee, chaired by Shaun Bailey
- Planning and Regeneration Committee, chaired by James Small-Edwards
- Police and Crime Committee, chaired by Susan Hall
- Transport Committee, chaired by Caroline Russell

The Police and Crime Committee was set up under the terms of the Police Reform and Social Responsibility Act 2011 in order to scrutinise the work of Mayor's Office for Policing and Crime, which replaced the Metropolitan Police Authority.

== Result maps ==
These maps only show constituency results and not list results.

2000 results

2004 results

2008 results

2012 results

2016 results

2021 results

2024 results

== London Youth Assembly ==
The London Assembly also operates a London Youth Assembly (LYA), which is made up of young people from across London. Each London borough elects or selects a representative and deputy representative to serve on the assembly. The procedure for choosing a representative is different in each borough, with some boroughs electing representatives while other representatives are selected by their local youth forum or council. Representatives are aged 11 to 19, or 11 to 25 if they have a disability or special needs. A representative may be known as a London Youth Assembly Member (LYAM) and a deputy representative may be known as a Deputy London Youth Assembly Member (DLYAM).

Ashan Khehra served as Chair of the London Youth Assembly (LYA) between 2024-25. He was elected unanimously in April 2024. He previously served as the LYA Member for Hounslow. Khehra has oversaw efforts to re-establish the Assembly following a period of inactivity. During his tenure, the LYA introduced several new initiatives, including the London Youth Achievement Awards, developed in partnership with the London Assembly to mark its 25th anniversary. He also implemented a shadow cabinet within the Assembly, intended to provide a structured way for young people to engage with and contribute to discussions on city-level policy.
