= Navin Shah =

British politician

Navin Shah CBE
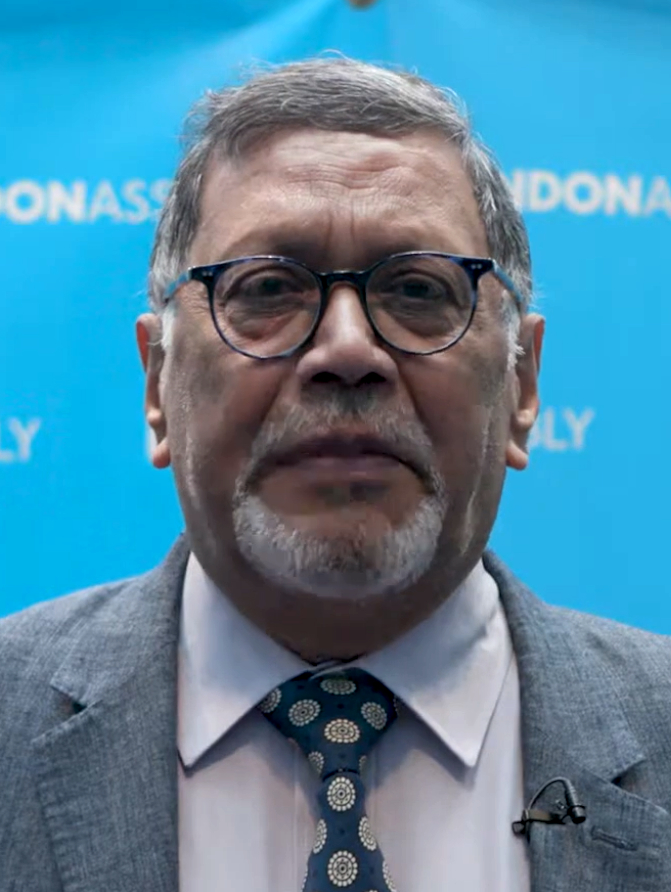
- Shah in 2019

Chair of the London Assembly
- In office May 2020 – May 2021
- Preceded by: Jennette Arnold
- Succeeded by: Andrew Boff

Member of the London Assembly Brent and Harrow
- In office 1 May 2008 – 7 May 2021
- Preceded by: Bob Blackman
- Succeeded by: Krupesh Hirani

Personal details
- Born: September 1946 (age 80) Ahmedabad, Gujarat, British India
- Party: Labour
- Spouse: Rekha
- Children: 2
- Education: University College London
- Occupation: Architect

Navin Fakirchand Shah (born September 1946) is a former British Labour Party politician who served as chair of the London Assembly between May 2020 and May 2021, and a Member of the London Assembly for Brent and Harrow from 2008 to 2021.

== Background ==
Shah moved to the United Kingdom in 1973 to study at University College London. He joined the Labour Party in 1977 and was elected to Harrow London Borough Council as a councillor for Kenton East Ward in 1994. Shah was Leader of Harrow Council from 2004 to 2006, and remained the Harrow Labour Group Leader until June 2008.

He was elected as a member of the London Assembly at the 2008 assembly elections, taking the constituency seat of Brent and Harrow, beating Conservative incumbent Bob Blackman. He was re-elected in 2012 and 2016. He later challenged Blackman for his Harrow East parliamentary seat at the 2017 general election, and was defeated by just 1,757 votes.

With the deferral of 2020 London Assembly election he was elected chair of London Assembly on 15 May 2020 succeeding Jennette Arnold.

Shah was appointed Commander of the Order of the British Empire (CBE) in the 2022 Birthday Honours for political and public service.
