= Krupesh Hirani =

British politician (born 1985)

Krupesh Hirani AM
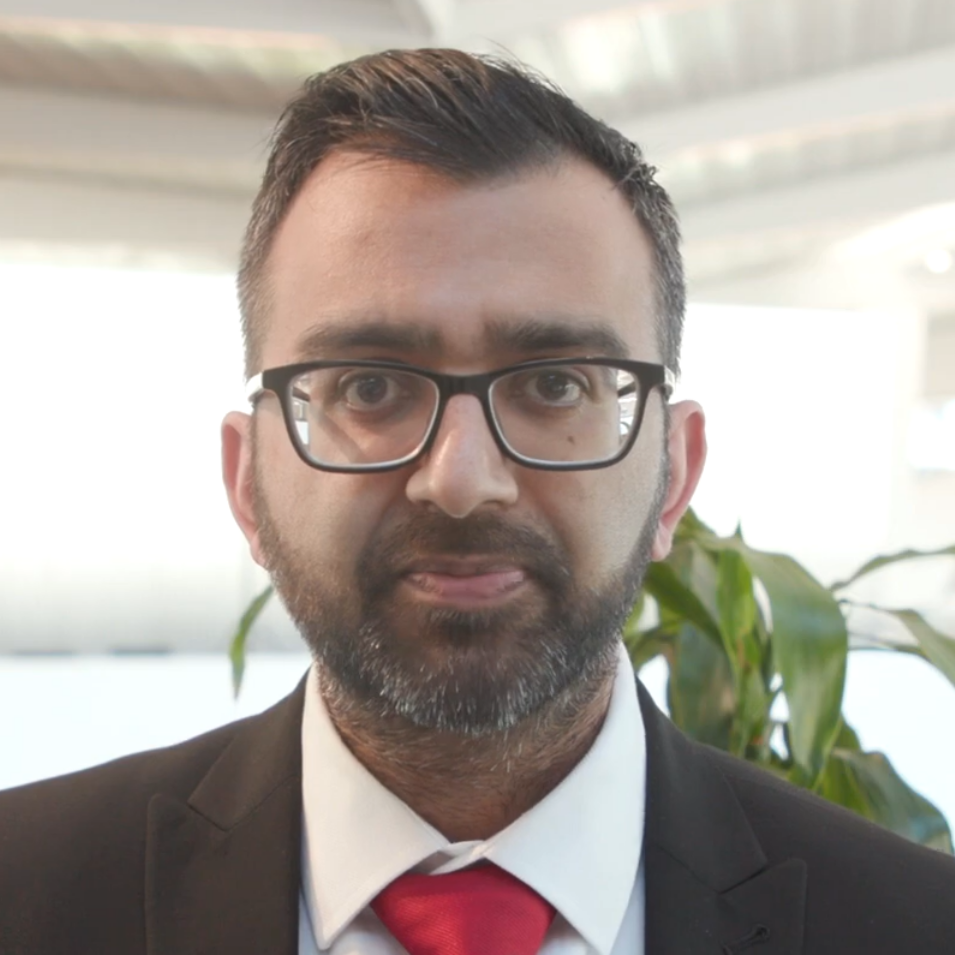
- Hirani in 2025

Member of the London Assembly for Brent and Harrow
- Incumbent
- Assumed office 8 May 2021
- Preceded by: Navin Shah
- Majority: 8,828 (5.6%)

Personal details
- Born: Krupesh Jadavji Hirani; November 29, 1985 (age 40) Park Royal, London, England
- Party: Labour and Co-operative
- Spouse: Amrat Vekaria (m. 2013)
- Children: 1
- Education: University of Nottingham
- Website: krupesh.co.uk

Krupesh Jadavji Hirani (born 29 November 1985) is a British Labour and Co-operative politician who has been the London Assembly Member for Brent and Harrow since 2021. He previously represented Dudden Hill ward on Brent Council from 2010 to 2022.

== Early life and education ==
Hirani was born in the Central Middlesex Hospital, London, to parents Jadavji Hirani and Hirbai Hirani. He attended Braintcroft Primary School in Neasden and then Preston Manor School in Wembley. He graduated with a Bachelor of Arts in politics from the University of Nottingham. Hirani received an Alumni Laureate Award from the university in 2013.

== Career ==
From 2009 to 2015, Hirani was a policy manager at the disability charity Aspire. He was a London regional officer for the MS Society from 2015 to 2020.

Hirani was elected to Brent London Borough Council in 2010, where he was responsible for public health. He has been chair of Metroland Cultures, a Brent-based arts organisation, since 2020. Hirani was re-elected in 2014 and 2018, but did not stand in 2022.

In 2019 Hirani announced his run for the London Assembly. He was elected at the 2021 London Assembly election to be a Labour and Co-operative member of the London Assembly for Brent and Harrow.

As a London Assembly Member, Krupesh has campaigned for community safety in his constituency, focusing on neighbourhood policing. He has also campaigned to raise awareness of Hinduphobia in London, urging the Metropolitan Police Service to better record it.

Currently, he chairs the Health Committee at the London Assembly. In his role, he has highlighted the benefits of improved air quality at London's schools and helped tackle pollution in Neasden. He has campaigned to improve the rates at which Londoners vaccinate their children against diseases such as measles. is the Deputy Chair of the Budget and Performance Committee. He also sits on the London Assembly's Audit Panel.

== Personal life ==
In 2013, Hirani married Amrat Vekaria; the couple have a daughter. He lists his recreations as politics, football and running.
