= Homelessness Reduction Act 2017 =

Act of the Parliament of the United Kingdom

- Act of Parliament
- Parliament of the United Kingdom
- Long title: An Act to make provision about measures for reducing homelessness; and for connected purposes
- Citation: 2017 c. 13
- Introduced by: Bob Blackman MP (Commons); Lord Best (Lords)

Dates
- Royal assent: 27 April 2017

Status: Current legislation

The Homelessness Reduction Act 2017 is an act of the Parliament of the United Kingdom. It amends the Housing Act 1996. The act started as a private member's bill introduced by Conservative member of Parliament for Harrow East Bob Blackman.

Blackman was drawn second in the 2016 annual parliamentary ballot for a private member's bill and put together the bill in partnership with national homelessness charity, Crisis. It was the first private member's bill to be supported by a select committee.

After receiving government support at second reading, it passed through all stages in Parliament unopposed in both Houses and received royal assent on 27 April 2017, 40 years after the Housing (Homeless Persons) Act 1977 received royal assent.

== Provisions ==
The act places a duty on local authorities to give individuals at risk of homelessness a "personalised housing plan".

Unlike Scotland, the legislation does not guarantee homeless people housing.

== Implementation ==
The act came into force in April 2018, and councils were allocated £72,700,000 in order to implement its provisions.

The act has been described as the most "expensive" private member's bill in terms of implementation costs.

== See also ==
- Homelessness in England
