= Bob Blackman =

British Conservative politician (born 1956)

Bob Blackman CBE MP
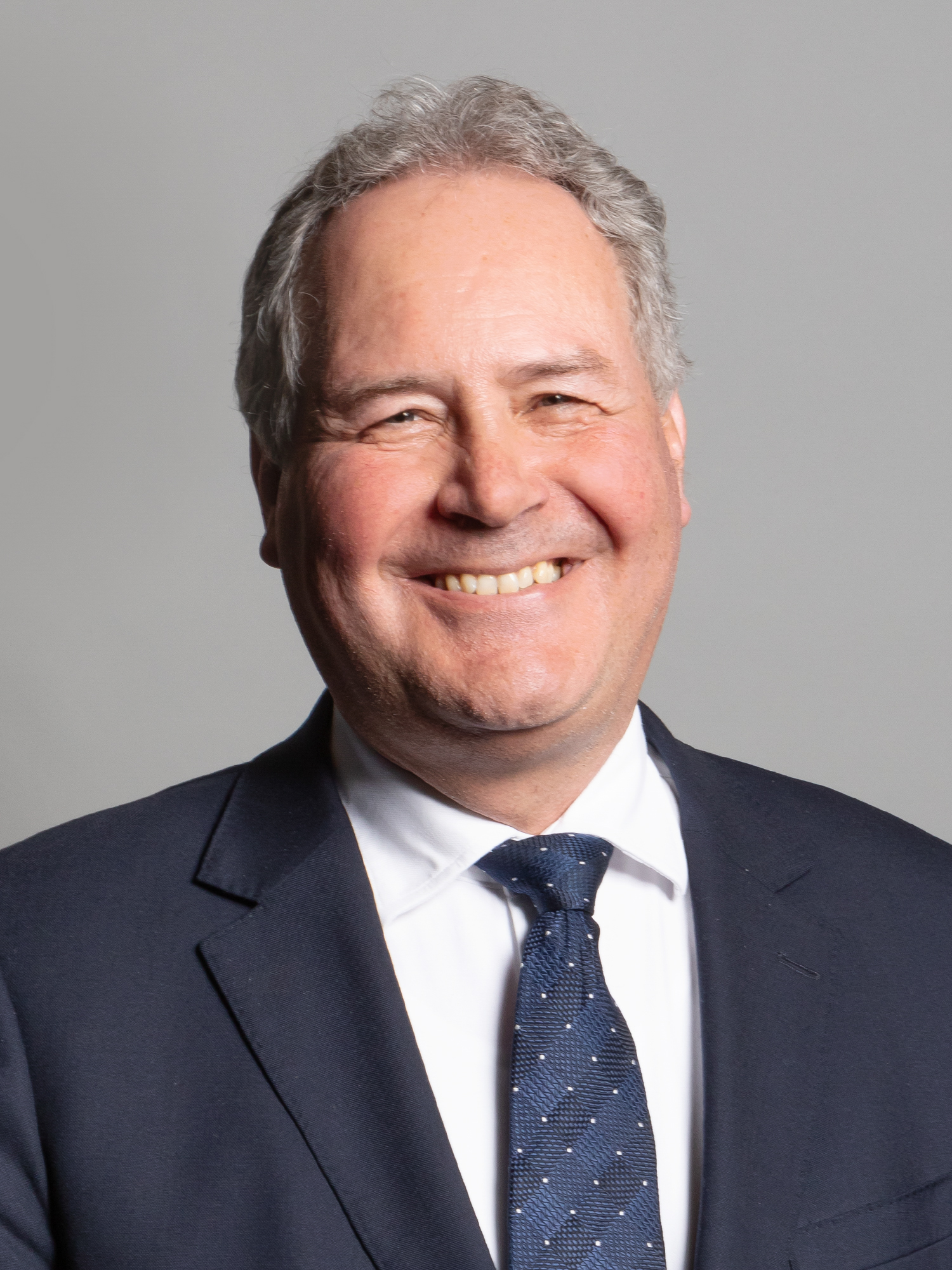
- Official portrait, 2020

Chair of the Backbench Business Committee
- Incumbent
- Assumed office 9 September 2024
- Preceded by: Ian Mearns

Chairman of the 1922 Committee
- Incumbent
- Assumed office 9 July 2024
- Leader: Rishi Sunak; Kemi Badenoch
- Preceded by: Graham Brady

Executive Secretary of the 1922 Committee
- In office 17 May 2012 – 9 July 2024
- Leader: David Cameron; Theresa May; Boris Johnson; Liz Truss; Rishi Sunak

Member of Parliament for Harrow East
- Incumbent
- Assumed office 6 May 2010
- Preceded by: Tony McNulty
- Majority: 11,680 (24.4%)

Member of the London Assembly for Brent and Harrow
- In office 10 June 2004 – 1 May 2008
- Preceded by: Toby Harris
- Succeeded by: Navin Shah

Member of Brent London Borough Council for Preston
- In office November 1986 – May 2010

Personal details
- Born: Robert John Blackman; 26 April 1956 (age 70) Kensington, London, England
- Party: Conservative
- Spouse: Nicola Blackman (m. 1988)
- Education: University of Liverpool (BSc)
- Website: bobblackman.org.uk parliament.uk biography

Robert John Blackman CBE MP (born 26 April 1956) is a British politician who has served as chairman of the 1922 Committee and chair of the Backbench Business Committee since 2024. A member of the Conservative Party, he has been the Member of Parliament (MP) for Harrow East since 2010. He served as the Joint Executive Secretary of the backbench 1922 Committee from 2012 to 2024. Blackman was the Member of the London Assembly (MLA) for Brent and Harrow between 2004 and 2008.

== Early life and career ==
Robert Blackman was born on 26 April 1956 in Kensington. After three A-levels, he studied maths and physics at the University of Liverpool, where he graduated with a BSc. While at Liverpool, he was president of the students' union.

After graduation, he joined the sales team of Burroughs Machines (later Unisys). Blackman worked in various sales and management positions for BT and worked at their training school in Milton Keynes as a tutor and later as a regulatory compliance manager for BT until his election to Parliament.

== Political career ==
Blackman unsuccessfully stood as the Conservative candidate in the Tokyngton ward of Brent London Borough Council in 1986. A few months later, in November 1986, he stood in the Preston ward in a by-election and was elected; he retained the seat until 2010, when he did not stand. He was the leader of the Conservative group on Brent council from 1990 to 2010, having been council leader between 1991 and 1996, when his party lost control of the council. From June 2006 to May 2010, he was deputy leader of Brent Council, the Conservatives having formed a coalition with the Liberal Democrats.

He stood as the Conservative Party candidate for the London Assembly constituency of Brent and Harrow at the 2000 elections, losing to the Labour candidate Toby Harris. He defeated Harris at the 2004 assembly elections and was elected as the Conservative group's whip on the London Assembly.

In the 2008 London Assembly election, Blackman lost his seat to the Labour candidate Navin Shah by 1,649 votes.

In 2024, Blackman successfully ran for the position of chairman of the Conservative party's "1922 Committee". He won against fellow backbencher Geoffrey Clifton-Brown by 61 votes to 37 – with 98 votes cast.

== Parliamentary career ==
At the 1992 general election, Blackman stood for election in Brent South, coming second with 30.5% of the vote behind the incumbent Labour MP Paul Boateng.

Blackman stood in Bedford at the 1997 general election, coming second with 33.7% of the vote behind the Labour candidate Patrick Hall.

At the 2005 general election, Blackman stood for election in Brent North, coming second with 33% of the vote behind the incumbent Labour MP Barry Gardiner.

He has taken the oath of allegiance on both the King James Version and the Bhagavad Gita multiple times.

=== 1st term (2010–2015) ===
At the 2010 general election, Blackman was elected to Parliament as MP for Harrow East with 44.7% of the vote and a majority of 3,403.

In 2010, Blackman was elected a member of the Communities and Local Government Select Committee and was elected secretary of the 1922 Committee in 2015 (serving jointly with Nigel Evans until 8 January 2020 when Evans became second deputy chairman of Ways and Means).

Blackman called for the adoption of plain packaging legislation for cigarettes in November 2012, and supported Cameron's plan calling for energy companies to provide simplified energy bills to their customers.

In December 2012, when the Conservative Party launched a consultation into legalising same-sex marriages, Blackman suggested that David Cameron should resurrect Section 28, stating that he believed that "Section 28 was the right rules to have in school so that we should not in any way shape or form promote same-sex relationships" and said he would be "very opposed" to seeing teachers being forced to say same-sex relationships are equivalent to heterosexual relationships. Soon afterwards, David Cameron announced his approval for same-sex marriage. In response, Blackman told the BBC News Channel that Cameron's backing of religious same-sex marriages was wrong "on principle" and that marriage had to be "between one man and one woman". According to the Harrow Times, he was accused of hypocrisy by a former fellow Brent council colleague who claimed she had an 11-year affair with him whilst he was married. On 5 February 2013, Bob Blackman voted against the bill in the House of Commons second reading vote on marriage equality in Britain.

Blackman is an officer of the Conservative Friends of Israel group. He has been part of several delegations to Israel, including during the Operation Defensive Shield conflict when he visited for an Israeli military briefing on the Iron Dome defence system.

In 2015, the compliance officer for the Independent Parliamentary Standards Authority (IPSA) made a judgement that Blackman had submitted 732 inaccurate mileage claims. According to IPSA he claimed up to 10 miles for a two-mile journey, making him the highest-mileage MP, claiming almost twice the mileage as the 10 next-highest MPs.

=== 2nd term (2015–2017) ===
Blackman was re-elected as MP for Harrow East at the 2015 general election with an increased vote share of 50.3% and an increased majority of 4,757.

On 1 July 2015, Blackman was elected chair of the All Party Political Group on Smoking and Health, after serving as its secretary for several years.

Blackman supported Brexit in the 2016 referendum. He subsequently joined the European Research Group, a Eurosceptic group within Parliament.

In October 2016, he was drawn second in the annual Parliamentary ballot for a Private Member's Bill and put together a Homelessness Reduction Bill in partnership with national homelessness charity, Crisis. It was the first Private Member's Bill to be supported by a select committee. After receiving Government support at second reading, it passed through all stages in Parliament unopposed in both Houses and received Royal Assent on 27 April 2017.

=== 3rd term (2017–2019) ===
At the snap 2017 general election, Blackman was again re-elected, with a decreased vote share of 49.4% and a decreased majority of 1,757.

In October 2017, Blackman drew criticism from Tom Peck of The Independent for hosting Tapan Ghosh, an anti-Islam extremist from India, at a House of Commons event. Blackman also shared anti-Islam posts on Twitter by far-right activist Tommy Robinson and was a member of various anti-Islam groups on Facebook. These comments and others by some Conservative candidates and representatives led the Muslim Council of Britain to call for an independent inquiry into alleged Islamophobia in the Conservative Party.

In Parliament, Blackman serves on the Procedure Committee, the Backbench Business Committee and the Housing, Communities and Local Government Committee.

In March 2019, Blackman was among a group of MPs who argued for a number of measures to encourage people to quit smoking and prevent young people from taking it up, including raising the legal smoking age to 21 and introducing a levy on large tobacco companies.

Also in March 2019, Blackman was one of 21 MPs who voted against LGBT-inclusive sex and relationship education in English schools.

In August 2019, Blackman expressed his support for Indian Prime Minister Narendra Modi revoking Article 370 of the Constitution of India, calling the article an "anomaly", adding that "Kashmiri Pandits must be guaranteed right of return after they were the victims of ethnic cleansing".

=== 4th term (2019–2024) ===
Blackman was again re-elected at the 2019 general election, with an increased vote share of 54.4% and an increased majority of 8,170.

Following an interim report on the connections between colonialism and properties now in the care of the National Trust, including links with historic slavery, Blackman was among the signatories of a letter to The Telegraph in November 2020 from the "Common Sense Group" of Conservative Parliamentarians. The letter accused the National Trust of being "coloured by cultural Marxist dogma, colloquially known as the 'woke agenda'".

Blackman attended a Diwali event held in October 2022 at the Houses of Parliament as a guest of the Hindu Forum of Britain. Nithya Atmadayananda, a prominent supporter of Nithyananda, was photographed with Blackman and the President of the Hindu Forum of Britain, Trupti Patel. The brochure for the event featured a full-page advert for Kailasa UK containing images of Nithyananda.

=== 5th term (2024–) ===
At the 2024 general election, Blackman was again re-elected, with a decreased vote share of 53.3% and an increased majority of 11,680. Blackman was the only Conservative to achieve over 50% of the vote in their constituency. He was elected unopposed as the Chair of the Backbench Business Committee on 9 September 2024.

=== Azerbaijan All-Party Parliamentary Group ===
Blackman is the chair of the Azerbaijan All-Party Parliamentary Group (APPG). In 2013, The Guardian published an article "Plush hotels and caviar diplomacy: how Azerbaijan's elite wooed MPs", criticising Blackman's five-day visit to Azerbaijan, paid for by The European Azerbaijan Society (TEAS). The National highlighted in 2022 that several of his trips to Azerbaijan were paid for by the Azerbaijani parliament or its London embassy. Blackman received a series of briefings from high-level Azerbaijani figures, including in 2020 and 2021 from Azerbaijani MP Javanshir Feyziyev, who was investigated by the National Crime Agency, followed by a court case where £5.6m of laundered cash was ordered to be seized from his family's accounts. OpenDemocracy reported in February 2022 that Blackman tabled four pro-regime motions in the House and had written to two foreign secretaries, urging them to strengthen ties with Azerbaijan and condemn its opponent Armenia.

Blackman told the Eye To Eye podcast in July 2020 that he "put down positions on behalf of good friends in Azerbaijan" on a regular basis, that [referring to July 2020 Armenian–Azerbaijani clashes] "in these types of conflicts ... whoever gets the best propaganda tends to grab the attention of the listeners and the viewers", adding that in this regard he has been "fed the information through the Azerbaijan embassy in the UK", praising the latter for being "very very helpful and proactive". Blackman urged the then foreign secretary, Dominic Raab, to take Azerbaijan's side in the 2020 Nagorno-Karabakh war. On Blackman's Azerbaijan lobbying, Steve Goodrich from anti-corruption group Transparency International UK commented "It's pretty shocking if you've got MPs essentially being briefed by foreign embassies and then making contributions in the House based on what they've been advised to say."

== Personal life ==
Blackman married Nicola Jennings in 1988. He employs his wife as a part-time office manager.

Blackman is a supporter of Tottenham Hotspur and holds a season ticket.

== Honours and awards ==
Blackman was appointed Commander of the Order of the British Empire (CBE) in the 2023 Birthday Honours for political and public service.

- India:
  - 2020: Padma Shri of India
- Azerbaijan:
  - 2023: Medal of Honour of the Milli Majlis (Parliament of Azerbaijan), awarded in recognition of his contributions to the development of Azerbaijan–United Kingdom inter-parliamentary relations.

Parliament of the United Kingdom
Preceded by Tony McNulty	Member of Parliament for Harrow East; 2010–present	Incumbent
Political offices
Preceded by Graham Brady	Chairman of the 1922 Committee; 2024–present	Incumbent
