= 2016 London Assembly election =

- 5 May 2016

All 25 seats in the London Assembly 13 seats needed for a majority
- Turnout: 45.6% ▲8.1%
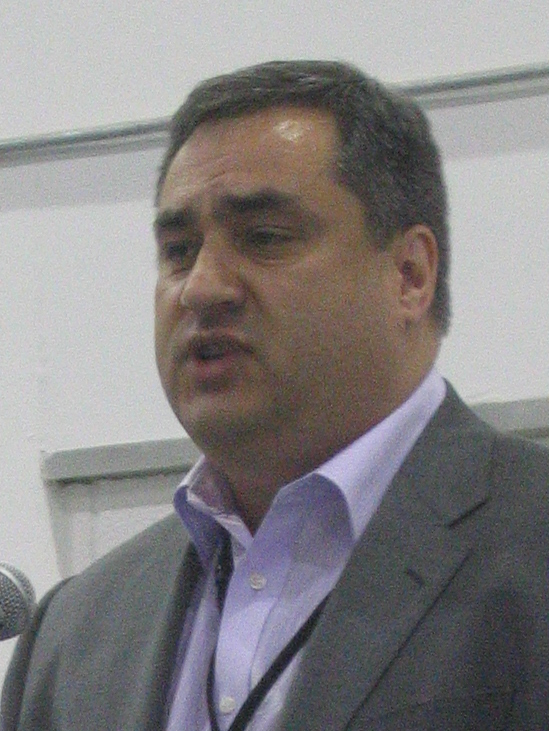

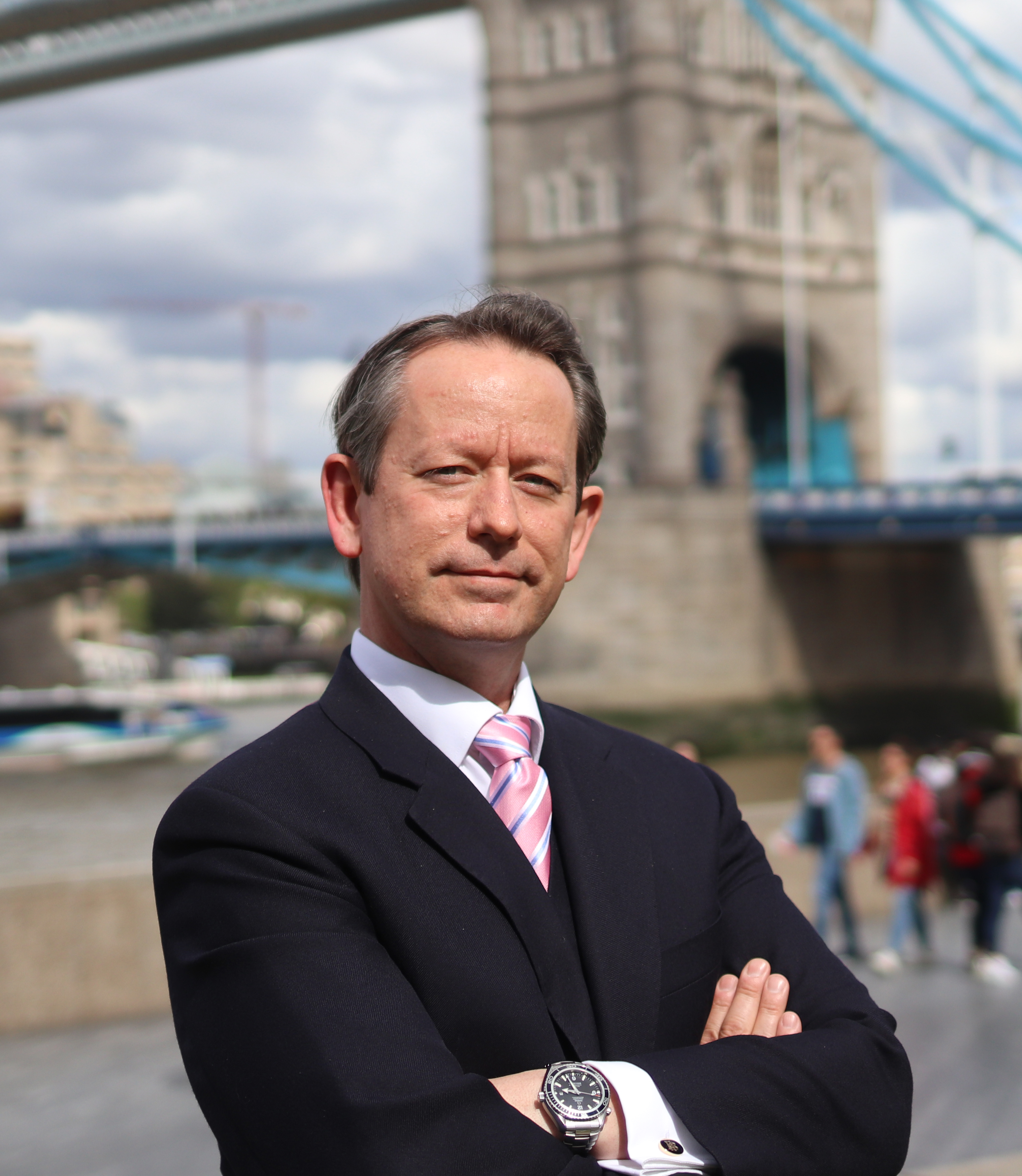

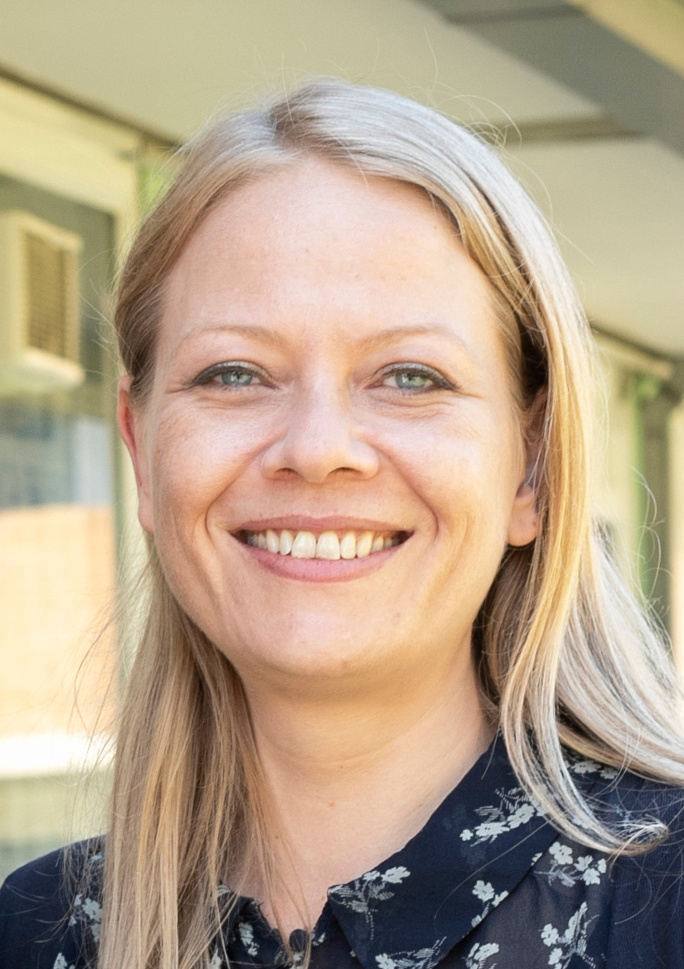

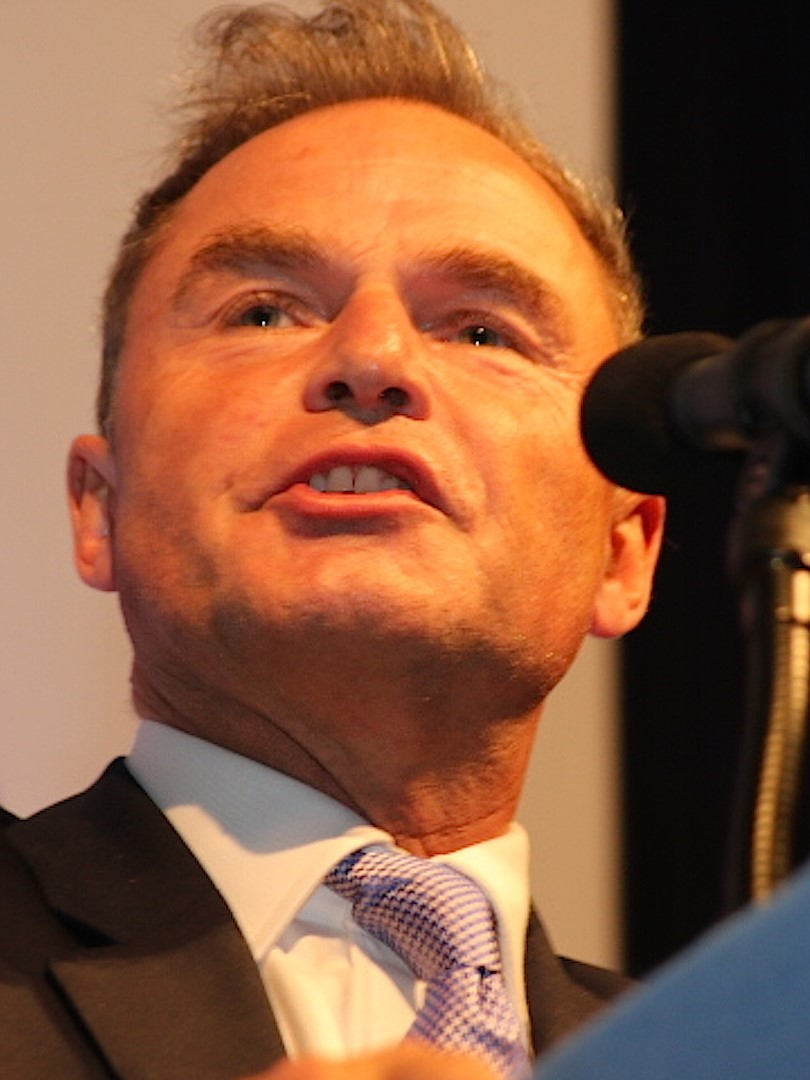

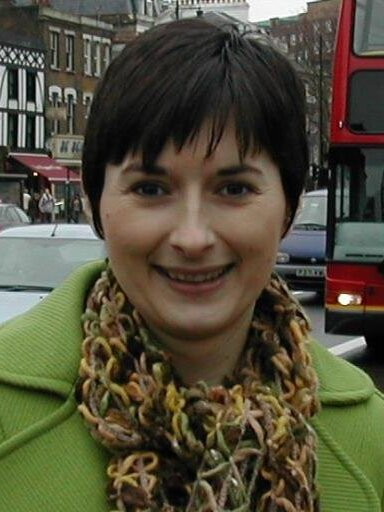
	First party	Second party	Third party
Leader	Len Duvall	Gareth Bacon	Siân Berry
Party	Labour	Conservative	Green
Leader's seat	Greenwich and Lewisham	Bexley and Bromley (Note: Previously Additional member from 2008-2016, before being elected to Bexley and Bromley at this election.)	Additional member (Note: Not an incumbent but stood for a list seat and won)
Last election	12 seats	9 seats	2 seats
Seats won	12	8	2
Seat change	Steady	▼1	Steady
Constituency vote	1,138,576	812,415	236,809
% and swing	43.5% ▲1.2%	31.1% ▼1.6%	9.1% ▲0.5%
Party vote	1,054,801	764,230	207,959
% and swing	40.3% ▼0.8%	29.2% ▼2.8%	8.0% ▼0.6%
	Fourth party	Fifth party
Leader	Peter Whittle	Caroline Pidgeon
Party	UKIP	Liberal Democrats
Leader's seat	Additional member (Note: Not an incumbent but stood for a list seat and won)	Additional member
Last election	0 seats	2 seats
Seats won	2	1
Seat change	▲2	▼1
Constituency vote	199,448	195,820
% and swing	7.6% ▲3.3%	7.5% ▼1.3%
Party vote	171,069	165,580
% and swing	6.5% ▲2.0%	6.3% ▼0.5%

The 2016 London Assembly election was held on 5 May 2016 to elect the members of the London Assembly. It took place on the same day as the London mayoral election and the United Kingdom local elections. Four parties had AMs in the previous Assembly: London Labour, led by Len Duvall, London Conservatives led by Gareth Bacon, London Greens led by Siân Berry, and the London Liberal Democrats led by Caroline Pidgeon.

Labour received the largest number of votes ever cast for a party in a London Assembly election, becoming the first party to poll over 1 million votes. Although they gained Merton and Wandsworth from the Conservatives, their regional vote share declined by 0.8%, and they finished with 12 AMs, the same as in 2012. The Conservative Party won just 8 Assembly seats, its worst-ever performance in a London Assembly election. The Green Party retained its 2 Assembly members, although its 8.0% share of the regional vote represented its worst-ever result, and UKIP returned to the London Assembly for the first time since the election of 2004. The Liberal Democrats elected just 1 AM, their worst-ever result.

Of the minor parties, the newly formed Women's Equality Party was the most successful, attracting 91,772 votes (3.51%) on the regional list, which did not entitle them to any Assembly members as the threshold for representation is 5% of the regional vote. No other party polled above 2%.

== Overview ==
The election system used is called the Additional Member System. There are 14 constituencies that elect one member each to the Assembly. These seats have been won only by the Labour Party or the Conservative Party. The remaining 11 seats are distributed by a second vote, by a modified D'Hondt method of closed-list voting, with a 5% minimum threshold. These seats have been won by other parties too, namely the Green Party, the Liberal Democrats and UKIP, and in the past the British National Party. The overall result is an attempted compromise between constituency representation and London-wide proportional representation.

Those who were eligible had to be registered to vote before 19 April 2016 in order to take part in this election.

== Candidates ==
=== Constituency candidates ===
Constituency	Conservative	Labour	Green	UKIP	Lib Dems	Others
Barnet & Camden	Dan Thomas (65,242, 2nd)	Andrew Dismore (I) (81,482, 1st)	Stephen Taylor (16,996, 3rd)	Joseph Langton (9,057, 5th)	Zack Polanski (11,204, 4th)	
Bexley & Bromley	Gareth Bacon (I) (87,460, 1st)	Sam Russell (45,791, 2nd)	Roisin Robertson (12,685, 4th)	Frank Gould (30,485, 3rd)	Julie Ireland (12,145, 5th)	Veronica Obadara (APP) (1,243, 6th)
Brent & Harrow	Joel Davidson (59,147, 2nd)	Navin Shah (I) (79,902, 1st)	Jafar Hassan (9,874, 4th)	Rathy Alagaratnam (9,074, 5th)	Anton Georgiou (11,534, 3rd)	Akib Mahmood (Respect) (5,170, 6th)
City & East	Chris Chapman (32,546, 2nd)	Unmesh Desai (122,175, 1st)	Rachel Collinson (18,766, 3rd)	Peter Harris (18,071, 4th)	Elaine Bagshaw (10,714, 5th)	Mikail Rayne (Respect) (6,772, 6th); Amina Gichinga (Take Back the City) (1,368, 7th); Aaron D'Souza (APP) (1,009, 8th)
Croydon & Sutton	Steve O'Connell (I) (70,156, 1st)	Marina Ahmad (58,542, 2nd)	Tracey Hague (13,513, 5th)	Peter Staveley (18,338, 4th)	Amna Ahmad (18,859, 3rd)	Madonna Lewis (APP) (1,386, 6th); Richard Edmonds (NF) (1,106, 7th)
Ealing & Hillingdon	Dominic Gilham (70,155, 2nd)	Onkar Sahota (I) (86,088, 1st)	Meena Hans (15,758, 4th)	Alex Nieora (15,832, 3rd)	Francesco Fruzza (13,154, 5th)	
Enfield & Haringey	Linda Kelly (39,923, 2nd)	Joanne McCartney (I) (91,075, 1st)	Ronald Stewart (15,409, 3rd)	Neville Watson (9,042, 5th)	Nicholas da Costa (12,038, 4th)	Godson Azu (APP) (1,172, 6th)
Greenwich & Lewisham	Adam Thomas (30,840, 2nd)	Len Duvall (I) (85,735, 1st)	Imogen Solly (20,520, 3rd)	Paul Oakley (13,686, 4th)	Julia Fletcher (11,303, 5th)	Josephine Bangura (APP) (1,275, 6th)
Havering & Redbridge	Keith Prince (64,483, 1st)	Ivana Bartoletti (63,045, 2nd)	Lee Burkwood (9,617, 4th)	Lawrence Webb (26,788, 3rd)	Ian Sanderson (7,105, 5th)	
Lambeth & Southwark	Robert Flint (34,703, 2nd)	Florence Eshalomi (96,946, 1st)	Rashid Nix (25,793, 3rd)	Idham Ramadi (6,591, 5th)	Michael Bukola (21,489, 4th)	Kevin Parkin (SPGB) (1,333, 6th); Amadu Kanumansa (APP) (906, 7th)
Merton & Wandsworth	David Dean (73,039, 2nd)	Leonie Cooper (77,340, 1st)	Esther Obiri-Darko (14,682, 3rd)	Elizabeth Jones (8,478, 5th)	Adrian Hyyrylainen-Trett (10,732, 4th)	Thamilini Kulendran (Independent) (1,142, 6th)
North East	Sam Malik (32,565, 2nd)	Jennette Arnold (I) (134,307, 1st)	Samir Jeraj (29,401, 3rd)	Freddy Vachha (11,315, 5th)	Terry Stacy (14,312, 4th)	Tim Allen (Respect) (5,068, 6th); Bill Martin (SPGB), (1,293, 7th); Jonathan Silberman (Communist League) (536, 8th)
South West	Tony Arbour (I) (84,381, 1st)	Martin Whelton (62,937, 2nd)	Andree Frieze (19,745, 4th)	Alan Craig (14,983, 5th)	Rosina Robson (30,654, 3rd)	Adam Buick (SPGB) (1,065, 6th)
West Central	Tony Devenish (67,775, 1st)	Mandy Richards (53,211, 2nd)	Jennifer Nadel (14,050, 3rd)	Clive Egan (7,708, 5th)	Annabel Mullin (10,577, 4th)	
Source: London Elects

=== List candidates ===
2016 London Assembly election
List	Candidates	Votes	Of total (%)	± from prev.
Labour	Fiona Twycross, Tom Copley, Nicky Gavron, Murad Qureshi, Alison Moore, Preston Tabois, Feryal Demirci, Mike Katz, Emily Brothers, Bevan Powell, Sara Hyde	1,054,801	40.3%	–0.8%
Conservative	Kemi Badenoch, Andrew Boff, Shaun Bailey, Susan Hall, Amandeep Bhogal, Joanne Laban, Antonia Cox, Joy Morrissey, Timothy Barnes, Gregory Stafford, Kishan Devani, Jonathan Cope	764,230	29.2%	–2.8%
Green	Siân Berry (207,959), Caroline Russell, Shahrar Ali, Jonathan Bartley, Noel Lynch, Rashid Nix, Dee Searle, Benali Hamdache, Andrea Carey Fuller, Anne RoseMary Warrington, Peter Underwood	207,959	8.0%	–0.6%
UKIP	Peter Whittle, David Kurten, Lawrence Webb, Peter Harris, Neville Watson, Piers Wauchope, Afzal Akram, Elizabeth Jones, Tariq Saeed, Freddy Vachha, Peter Staveley	171,069	6.5%	+2.0%
Liberal Democrats	Caroline Pidgeon, Emily Davey, Merlene Emerson, Rob Blackie, Zack Polanski, Dawn Barnes, Annabel Mullin, Marisha Ray, Adrian Hyyrylainen-Trett, Pauline Pearce, Benjamin Mathis	165,580	6.3%	–0.5%
Women's Equality	Sophie Walker, Harini Iyengar, Jacquelyn Guderley, Alison Marshall, Rebecca Manson Jones, Anila Dhami, Isabelle Parasram, Chris Paouros, Joanna Shaw, Kate Massey-Chase, Melanie Howard	91,772	3.5%	New
Respect	George Galloway, Akib Mahmood, Mikail Rayne, Clare McCaughey, Rehiana Ali, Terry Hoy, Simon Virgo, Saurav Dutt, Tehmeena Mahmood, Karina Lockhart	41,324	1.6%	New
Britain First	Jayda Fransen, Paul Golding, Christine Smith, Anne Elstone, Nancy Smith, Hollie Rouse, Peggy Saunders, Donna King, Kevan McMullen, Steven Connor	39,071	1.5%	New
CPA	Malcolm Martin, Maureen Martin, Yemi Awolola, Helen Spiby-Vann, Ray Towey, Damilola Adewuyi, Kathy Mils, Kayode Shedono, Des Coke, Ashley Dickenson, Stephen Hammond, Kevin Nichols	27,172	1.0%	–0.8%
Animal Welfare	Vanessa Hudson, Jonathan Homan, Alexander Bourke, Linda Seddon, Zsanett Csontos	25,810	1.0%	New
BNP	David Furness, Paul Sturdy, John Clarke, Michael Jones, Peter Finch, Nicola Finch, Denise Underwood, Stephen Dillon, Philip Dalton, Gareth Jones, Beb Smith	15,833	0.6%	–1.5%
The House Party	Terry McGrenera	11,055	0.4%	+0.1%

Rejected ballots 29,733 (1.1%)

Total votes 2,645,409

Note that party descriptions can be used as alternatives to the registered party name. Descriptions used in this election were:

- Britain First – Putting British people first
- Caroline Pidgeon's London Liberal Democrats
- Green Party – "vote Green on orange"
- Respect (George Galloway)
- UK Independence Party (UKIP)
- The House Party – Homes for Londoners

== Opinion polls ==
=== Constituency ===
Date(s) conducted	Polling organisation/client	Sample	Lab	Con	Lib Dem	Green	UKIP	Others	Lead
5 May 2016	Election results	2,614,912	43.5%	31.1%	7.5%	9.1%	7.6%	1.2%	12.4%
2–4 May 2016	YouGov	1,574	44%	30%	7%	7%	11%	1%	14%
15–19 April 2016	YouGov	1,017	46%	30%	9%	6%	9%	1%	16%
3 May 2012	Election results	2,207,677	42.3%	32.7%	8.8%	8.5%	4.3%	3.3%	9.6%

=== Regional list ===
Date(s) conducted	Polling organisation/client	Sample	Lab	Con	Green	Lib Dem	UKIP	WEP	Others	Lead
5 May 2016	Election results	2,615,676	40.3%	29.2%	8.0%	6.3%	6.5%	3.5%	3.9%	11.1%
2–4 May 2016	YouGov	1,574	39%	29%	9%	8%	11%	2%	3%	10%
15–19 April 2016	YouGov	1,017	45%	29%	7%	8%	9%	1%	0%	16%
3 May 2012	Election results	2,215,008	41.1%	32.0%	8.5%	6.8%	4.5%	—	7.1%	9.1%

== Results ==
Party	Constituency			Region			Total seats	+/–
Party	Votes	%	Seats	Votes	%	Seats	Total seats	+/–
Labour	1,138,576	43.56	9	1,054,801	40.33	3	12	Steady
Conservative	812,415	31.08	5	764,230	29.22	3	8	▼1
Green	236,809	9.06	0	207,959	7.95	2	2	Steady
UKIP	199,448	7.63	0	171,069	6.54	2	2	▲2
Liberal Democrats	195,820	7.49	0	165,580	6.33	1	1	▼1
Women's Equality				91,772	3.51	0	0	New
Respect	17,010	0.65	0	41,324	1.58	0	0	New
Britain First				39,071	1.49	0	0	New
CPA				27,172	1.04	0	0	Steady
Animal Welfare				25,810	0.99	0	0	New
BNP				15,833	0.61	0	0	Steady
The House Party				11,055	0.42	0	0	New
All People's Party	6,991	0.27	0				0	New
Socialist (GB)	3,691	0.14	0				0	Steady
Take Back the City	1,368	0.05	0				0	New
Communist League	536	0.02	0				0	Steady
Independent	1,142	0.04	0				0	Steady
Total	2,613,806	100.00	14	2,615,676	100.00	11	25	Steady
Valid votes	2,613,806	98.86		2,615,676	98.88			
Invalid/blank votes	30,215	1.14		29,733	1.12			
Total votes	2,644,021	100.00		2,645,409	100.00			
Registered voters/turnout	5,741,155	46.05		5,741,155	46.08			
Source: London Elects

Constituency Vote
Labour	43.5%
Conservative	31.1%
Green	9.1%
UKIP	7.6%
Liberal Democrats	7.5%
Others	1.2%

Regional Vote
Labour	40.3%
Conservative	29.2%
Green	8.0%
UKIP	6.5%
Liberal Democrats	6.3%
Others	5.3%

Assembly seats
Labour	48.0%
Conservative	32.0%
Green	8.0%
UKIP	8.0%
Liberal Democrats	4.0%

== See also ==
- 2016 London mayoral election
- London Assembly
- London Assembly constituencies
