= Animal Welfare Party =

Political party in the UK

- Leader: Vanessa Hudson
- Nominating Officer: Jon Homan
- Treasurer: Louise Cobham
- Veterinary advisor: Andre Menache
- Founded: 2 December 2006; 19 years ago
- Headquarters: 71–75 Shelton Street; London; WC2H 9JQ
- Ideology: Animal welfare
- Political position: Left-wing
- European political alliance: Animal Politics EU

Website
- www.animalwelfareparty.org

Animal Welfare Party (AWP) is a minor political party in the United Kingdom campaigning on an animal welfare, environment and health platform.

== History ==
The party was founded in December 2006 by Jasmijn de Boo, a Dutch national, of Kennington, London, and Shaun Rutherford of Milford Haven, Wales, as Animals Count! The party was registered with the Electoral Commission on 22 January 2007.

In October 2010, Vanessa Hudson was elected as party leader. In 2013, the party changed its name from Animals Count! to the Animal Welfare Party.

In June 2013, Hudson joined leaders from other animal protection parties from across Europe in a meeting in The Hague organised by the Animal Politics Foundation of the Netherlands. At this meeting the animal protection parties of the Netherlands, Spain, Portugal, Germany, Denmark, Italy, Turkey and the UK discussed ways in which they could work together more effectively. Later that month, Hudson announced that the Animal Welfare Party would stand in the London region in the 2014 European Parliament elections. It was one of seven European animal protection parties contesting the 2014 European elections with the aim of returning dedicated representatives for animals to the EU Parliament. This European group of parties became known informally as the EuroAnimal7 and included PvdD of The Netherlands, PACMA of Spain, PAN of Portugal, Partei Mensch Umwelt Tierschutz of Germany, Djurens Parti of Sweden, and Animal Party Cyprus.

In September 2017, the party gained its first elected representative after Alsager Town Councillor Jane Smith defected from the Green Party to the AWP.

In January 2024, the party gained a second representative after Hexham Town Councillor Lee Williscroft-Ferris, who had been elected as an independent, switched to the party.

== Ideology ==
The party's main goal is "a world in which animals are not exploited and are seen and treated as sentient beings". It describes itself as "primarily dedicated to advancing the rights of all non-human animals" and as "modelled on the successful Dutch Party for the Animals". It also postulates left-wing economic policies outside of animal issues; it advocates a 50% tax rate for those earning more than £150,000, in 2018 supported an increase of the minimum wage to £10 per hour, and supports reducing the private sector in housing in favour of the public sector.

== Electoral history ==
It initially intended to stand in the Welsh Assembly election in 2007. In the 2008 London Assembly election, de Boo stood in Lambeth and Southwark, receiving 1,828 votes (1.12%). The party sponsored an electoral list of three candidates for the 2009 European Parliament election in the East of England, receiving 13,201 votes (0.8%).

In the 2010 United Kingdom general election, the party contested one seat, which it did not win. The party sponsored an electoral list of eight candidates for the 2014 European Parliament election in the London region, receiving 21,092 votes (1.0%). Four AWP candidates contested the 2015 general election, all losing their deposits. They stood in the 2016 London Assembly election, receiving 1% of the vote. They stood four candidates in the 2017 general election and six in the 2019 general election: none were elected. They stood again in the 2021 and 2024 London Assembly elections, receiving 1.7% of the vote both times.

== Elections contested ==
=== Parliamentary elections ===
==== General election, 6 May 2010 ====
Note: Standing as "Animals Count"

| Constituency | Candidate | Votes | % |
|---|---|---|---|
| Islington South and Finsbury | Richard Deboo | 149 | 0.3 |

==== General election, 7 May 2015 ====
| Constituency | Candidate | Votes | % |
|---|---|---|---|
| Hackney North and Stoke Newington | Jon Homan | 225 | 0.5 |
| Holborn and St Pancras | Vanessa Hudson | 173 | 0.3 |
| Kensington | Andrew Knight | 158 | 0.5 |
| Putney | Guy Dessoy | 184 | 0.4 |

==== Scottish Parliament election, 5 May 2016 ====
| Region | Votes | % |
|---|---|---|
| Glasgow | 1,819 | 0.1 |

==== General election, 8 June 2017 ====
| Constituency | Candidate | Votes | % |
|---|---|---|---|
| Hackney North and Stoke Newington | Jon Homan | 222 | 0.4 |
| Hackney South and Shoreditch | Vanessa Hudson | 226 | 0.4 |
| Lewisham Deptford | Laura McAnea | 225 | 0.4 |
| Maidenhead | Andrew Knight | 282 | 0.5 |

==== General election, 12 December 2019 ====
| Constituency | Candidate | Votes | % |
|---|---|---|---|
| Bethnal Green and Bow | Vanessa Hudson | 439 | 0.7 |
| Chelsea and Fulham | Sam Morland | 500 | 1.1 |
| Congleton | Jane Smith | 658 | 1.1 |
| Kingswood | Angelika Cowell | 489 | 1.0 |
| New Forest East | Andrew Knight | 675 | 1.3 |
| Ruislip, Northwood and Pinner | Femy Amin | 325 | 0.6 |

==== Scottish Parliament election, 6 May 2021 ====
| Region | Votes | % |
|---|---|---|
| Lothian | 2,392 | 0.6 |

=== European Parliament elections ===
==== 2009 European elections ====
Note: Standing as "Animals Count"

| Regional lists | Candidates | Votes | % | MEPs |
|---|---|---|---|---|
| East of England | | 13,201 | 0.8 | 0 |

==== 2014 European elections ====
| Regional lists | Candidates | Votes | % | MEPs |
|---|---|---|---|---|
| London | | 21,092 | 1.0 | 0 |

==== 2019 European elections ====
| Regional lists | Candidates | Votes | % | MEPs |
|---|---|---|---|---|
| London | Vanessa Hudson; Jane Smith; Sam Morland; Ranjan Joshi; Mina Da Rui; Jonathan Homan; Simon Gouldman | 25,232 | 1.1 | 0 |

== See also ==
- Animal welfare in the United Kingdom
- Conservative Animal Welfare Foundation
- List of animal advocacy parties
