= Croydon and Sutton (London Assembly constituency) =

- Territorial constituency for the London Assembly
- Croydon and Sutton shown within London
- Created: 2000
- Number of members: One
- Member: Neil Garratt
- Party: Conservative
- Last election: 2024
- Next election: 2028

Croydon and Sutton is a constituency represented in the London Assembly.

It consists of the combined area of the London Borough of Croydon and the London Borough of Sutton.

== Overlapping constituencies ==
The south of Croydon is traditionally a more Conservative area, while the north of Croydon has traditionally Labour-voting areas. Sutton is competitive between the Liberal Democrats and the Conservatives. The equivalent Westminster seats are:

- Carshalton and Wallington (Liberal Democrat)
- Croydon West (Labour)
- Croydon East (Labour)
- Streatham and Croydon North (Labour)
- Croydon South (Conservative)
- Sutton and Cheam (Liberal Democrat)

== Assembly members ==
Election	Member	Party
2000	Andrew Pelling	Conservative
2008	Steve O'Connell	Conservative
2021	Neil Garratt	Conservative

== Assembly election results ==
2024 London Assembly election: Croydon and Sutton
Party	Candidate	Constituency			List		
Party	Candidate	Votes	%	±%	Votes	%	±%
Conservative	Neil Garratt	64,674	35.0	▼6.4	60,955	33.0	▼6.3
Labour	Maddie Henson	54,380	29.4	▼1.9	53,473	28.9	▼0.7
Liberal Democrats	Trish Fivey	29,160	15.8	▲1.4	22,023	11.9	▲2.7
Green	Peter Underwood	19,434	10.5	▲0.6	17,682	9.6	▼0.6
Reform	Marian Lynn Newton	14,375	7.8	▲6.0	13,624	7.4	▲6.4
TUSC	April Jacqueline Ashley	2,766	1.5	New			
Rejoin EU					3,801	2.1	▲0.4
Animal Welfare					3,023	1.6	▼0.2
Britain First					2,936	1.6	New
CPA					2,678	1.4	▼0.1
SDP					1,911	1.0	▲0.7
Laurence Fox					1,147	0.6	New
Communist					664	0.4	▲0.1
Farah London					596	0.3	New
Heritage					311	0.2	▼0.4
Gabe Romualdo					78	0.0	New
Majority		10,294	5.6	▼4.5			
Valid votes		184,789			184,902		
Invalid votes		1,332			1,195		
Turnout		186,121	42.23		186,097	42.23	
Conservative hold		Swing					

2021 London Assembly election: Croydon and Sutton
Party	Candidate	Constituency			List		
Party	Candidate	Votes	%	±%	Votes	%	±%
Conservative	Neil Garratt	75,246	41.4	▲2.8	71,168	39.3	▲4.4
Labour Co-op	Patsy Cummings	56,975	31.3	▼0.9	53,534	29.6	▼1.9
Liberal Democrats	Claire Bonham	26,258	14.4	▲4.0	16,683	9.2	▼0.6
Green	Peter Underwood	18,069	9.9	▲2.5	18,450	10.2	▲4.1
Reform	Robert Poll	3,190	1.8	New	1,736	1.0	New
Let London Live	Renos Sampson	2,021	1.1	New	1,198	0.7	New
Animal Welfare					3,298	1.8	▲0.8
Rejoin EU					2,990	1.7	New
CPA					2,766	1.5	▲0.1
Women's Equality					2,762	1.5	▼0.7
UKIP					2,132	1.2	▼7.8
London Real					1,217	0.7	New
Heritage					1,035	0.6	New
SDP					560	0.3	New
Communist					528	0.3	New
TUSC					398	0.2	New
Londependence Party					337	0.2	New
National Liberal					178	0.1	New
Majority		18,271	10.1	▲3.7			
Valid votes		181,759			180,970		
Invalid votes		2,659			3,457		
Turnout		184,418	42.7	▼2.9	184,427	42.7	▼2.9
Conservative hold		Swing		▲1.9			

2016 London Assembly election: Croydon and Sutton
Party	Candidate	Constituency			List		
Party	Candidate	Votes	%	±%	Votes	%	±%
Conservative	Steve O'Connell (Note: Incumbent member for this constituency)	70,156	38.6	▼0.5	63,550	34.9	▼1.7
Labour	Marina Ahmad	58,542	32.2	▼0.7	57,284	31.5	▼0.8
Liberal Democrats	Amna Ahmad	18,859	10.4	▼3.8	17,749	9.8	▼0.1
UKIP	Peter Staveley	18,338	10.1	▲3.2	16,368	9.0	▲2.3
Green	Tracey Hague	13,513	7.4	▲0.8	11,076	6.1	▼0.3
All People's Party	Madonna Lewis	1,386	0.8	New			
National Front	Richard Edmonds	1,106	0.6	New			
Women's Equality					4,071	2.2	New
Britain First					3,476	1.9	New
CPA					2,564	1.4	▼1.0
Respect					2,161	1.2	New
Animal Welfare					1,822	1.0	New
BNP					1,160	0.6	▼1.9
The House Party					629	0.3	0.0
Majority		11,614	6.4	▲0.2			
Valid votes		181,900			181,910		
Invalid votes		1,668			1,666		
Turnout		183,568	45.6	▲9.9	183,576	45.6	▲9.8
Conservative hold		Swing		▲0.2			

2012 London Assembly election: Croydon and Sutton
Party	Candidate	Constituency			List		
Party	Candidate	Votes	%	±%	Votes	%	±%
Conservative	Steve O'Connell	60,152	39.1	▼4.2	56,495	36.6	▼4.3
Labour	Louisa Woodley	50,734	32.9	▲13.7	49,804	32.3	▲11.7
Liberal Democrats	Abigail Lock	21,889	14.2	▼4.1	15,228	9.9	▼4.6
UKIP	Winston McKenzie	10,757	6.9	▲1.5	10,339	6.7	▲3.8
Green	Gordon Ross	10,287	6.6	▲1.5	9,866	6.4	▲0.8
BNP					3,842	2.5	▼3.5
CPA					3,701	2.4	▼1.3
English Democrat					2,205	1.4	0.0
TUSC					877	0.6	New
Independent	Rathy Alagaratnam				605	0.4	▲0.1
National Front					582	0.4	New
Independent	Ijaz Hayat				427	0.3	New
The House Party					394	0.3	New
Majority		9,418	6.2	▼17.9			
Valid votes		153,819			154,365		
Invalid votes		2,165			1,723		
Turnout		155,984	35.7	▼13.3	156,088	35.8	▼13.2
Conservative hold		Swing		▼9.0			

2008 London Assembly election: Croydon and Sutton
Party	Candidate	Constituency			List		
Party	Candidate	Votes	%	±%	Votes	%	±%
Conservative	Steve O'Connell	76,477	44.1	+4.7	71,149	40.9	▲7.0
Labour	Shafi Khan	33,812	19.5	+0.1	35,859	20.6	▲0.7
Liberal Democrats	Abigail Lock	32,335	18.6	–2.8	25,240	14.5	▼4.5
UKIP	David Pickles	9,440	5.4	–1.8	5,064	2.9	▼7.4
Green	Shasha Khan	8,969	5.2	+0.5	9,813	5.6	▼0.3
CPA	David Campanale	6,910	4.0	+0.8	6,442	3.7	▼0.2
English Democrat	Richard Castle	4,186	2.4	New	2,349	1.4	New
Left List	Zana Hussain	1,361	0.8	New	1,002	0.6	New
BNP					10,499	6.0	▲1.2
Abolish the Congestion Charge					3,542	2.0	New
Respect					1,994	1.1	▼1.1
Independent	Rathy Alagaratnam				446	0.3	New
Unity for Peace and Socialism					355	0.2	New
One London					184	0.1	New
Majority		42,665	24.1	▲6.6			
Valid votes		173,490			173,938		
Invalid votes		2,984			2,547		
Turnout		176,474	49.0	▲11.2	176,485	49.0	▲11.2
Conservative hold		Swing		▲3.3			

2004 London Assembly election: Croydon and Sutton
Party	Candidate	Constituency			List		
Party	Candidate	Votes	%	±%	Votes	%	±%
Conservative	Andrew Pelling	52,330	38.6	▼2.0	47,226	33.9	▼1.5
Liberal Democrats	Steve Gauge	28,636	21.1	▼4.5	26,421	19.0	▼0.3
Labour	Sean Fitzsimons	25,861	19.1	▼5.7	27,636	19.9	▼3.8
UKIP	James Feisenberger	15,203	11.2	New	14,262	10.3	▲8.0
Green	Shasha Khan	6,175	4.6	▼2.9	8,233	5.9	▼1.9
CPA	David Campanale	4,234	3.1	New	5,463	3.9	▼1.0
Respect	Waqas Hussain	3,108	2.3	New	3,001	2.2	New
BNP					6,699	4.8	▲2.2
Alliance for Diversity in Community, Uppal					167	0.1	New
Majority		23,694	17.5	▲2.6			
Valid votes		135,547			139,108		
Invalid votes		6,727			3,166		
Turnout		142,274	37.8	▲2.3	142,274	37.8	▲2.3
Conservative hold		Swing		▲1.3			

2000 London Assembly election: Croydon and Sutton
Party	Candidate	Constituency			List		
Party	Candidate	Votes	%	±%	Votes	%	±%
Conservative	Andrew Pelling	48,421	40.6	N/A	43,666	35.4	
Liberal Democrats	Anne Gallop	30,614	25.7	N/A	23,837	19.3	
Labour	Maggie Mansell	29,514	24.8	N/A	29,221	23.7	
Green	Peter Hickson	8,884	7.4	N/A	9,658	7.8	
London Socialist	Mark Steel	1,823	1.5	N/A	907	0.7	
CPA					6,039	4.9	
BNP					3,206	2.6	
UKIP					2,902	2.3	
Pro-Motorist Small Shop					1,028	0.8	
Independent	Peter Tatchell				803	0.7	
Campaign Against Tube Privatisation					779	0.6	
Socialist Labour					675	0.5	
Natural Law					440	0.4	
Communist					354	0.3	
Majority		17,807	14.9	N/A			
Valid votes		119,256			123,515		
Invalid votes		10,370			6,111		
Turnout		129,626	35.5	N/A	129,626	35.5	N/A
Conservative win (new seat)							

== Mayoral election results ==
Below are the results for the candidate which received the highest share of the popular vote in the constituency at each mayoral election.

Year	Party	Candidate
2000	Independent	Ken Livingstone
2004	Conservative	Steve Norris
2008	Conservative	Boris Johnson
2012	Conservative	Boris Johnson
2016	Conservative	Zac Goldsmith
2021	Conservative	Shaun Bailey
2024	Conservative	Susan Hall

2024 London mayoral election (Croydon and Sutton)
Party	Candidate	Votes	%	±%
Conservative	Susan Hall	78,790	42.5	N/A
Labour	Sadiq Khan	59,482	32.1	N/A
Liberal Democrats	Rob Blackie	14,400	7.76	N/A
Green	Zoë Garbett	9,740	5.25	N/A
Reform	Howard Cox	6,518	3.51	N/A
Independent	Natalie Campbell	3,695	1.99	N/A
SDP	Amy Gallagher	3,166	1.71	N/A
Independent	Andreas Michli	2,081	1.12	N/A
Animal Welfare	Femy Amin	2,074	1.12	N/A
Independent	Tarun Ghulati	1,774	0.956	N/A
Britain First	Nick Scanlon	1,700	0.916	N/A
Count Binface for Mayor of London	Count Binface	1,689	0.91	N/A
London Real	Brian Rose	414	0.223	N/A
Turnout		186,236	42.3%	−0.419%
Rejected ballots		713		
Registered electors		440,715		+1.99%

2021 London mayoral election (Croydon and Sutton)
Party	Candidate	1st round		2nd round			1st round votesTransfer votes, 2nd round
Party	Candidate	Total	Of round	Transfers	Total	Of round	1st round votesTransfer votes, 2nd round
Conservative	Shaun Bailey	78,368	44.1%				
Labour	Sadiq Khan	57,317	32.3%				
Green	Siân Berry	11,923	6.71%				
Liberal Democrats	Luisa Porritt	9,153	5.15%				
Reclaim	Laurence Fox	3,774	2.12%				
Independent	Niko Omilana	2,902	1.63%				
London Real	Brian Rose	2,032	1.14%				
Rejoin EU	Richard Hewison	1,702	0.958%				
Count Binface for Mayor of London	Count Binface	1,585	0.892%				
Let London Live	Piers Corbyn	1,239	0.697%				
Women's Equality	Mandu Reid	1,172	0.66%				
UKIP	Peter John Gammons	1,147	0.646%				
Animal Welfare	Vanessa Hudson	1,115	0.628%				
Heritage	David Kurten	883	0.497%				
Independent	Nims Obunge	819	0.461%				
Independent	Farah London	718	0.404%				
SDP	Steve Kelleher	619	0.348%				
Renew	Kam Balayev	522	0.294%				
Independent	Max Fosh	354	0.199%				
Burning Pink	Valerie Brown	328	0.185%				
Turnout		184,418	42.7%				
Registered electors		432,130					

2016 London mayoral election (Croydon and Sutton)
Party	Candidate	1st round		2nd round			1st round votesTransfer votes, 2nd round
Party	Candidate	Total	Of round	Transfers	Total	Of round	1st round votesTransfer votes, 2nd round
Conservative	Zac Goldsmith	76,378	42.3%				
Labour	Sadiq Khan	63,964	35.4%				
Liberal Democrats	Caroline Pidgeon	12,470	6.9%				
UKIP	Peter Whittle	8,878	4.91%				
Green	Siân Berry	8,381	4.64%				
Britain First	Paul Golding	2,781	1.54%				
Women's Equality	Sophie Walker	2,540	1.41%				
Respect	George Galloway	1,946	1.08%				
Cannabis is Safer than Alcohol	Lee Eli Harris	1,221	0.676%				
BNP	David Furness	973	0.538%				
Independent	Prince Zylinski	871	0.482%				
One Love	Ankit Love	291	0.161%				
Turnout		183,693	45.6%				
Registered electors		402,396					

2012 London mayoral election (Croydon and Sutton)
Party	Candidate	1st round		2nd round			1st round votesTransfer votes, 2nd round
Party	Candidate	Total	Of round	Transfers	Total	Of round	1st round votesTransfer votes, 2nd round
Conservative	Boris Johnson	77,739	50.5%				
Labour	Ken Livingstone	50,393	32.7%				
Liberal Democrats	Brian Paddick	8,311	5.4%				
Independent	Siobhan Benita	5,717	3.71%				
Green	Jenny Jones	5,038	3.27%				
UKIP	Lawrence Webb	4,471	2.9%				
BNP	Carlos Cortiglia	2,334	1.52%				
Turnout		156,312	35.8%				
Registered electors		436,451					

2008 London mayoral election (Croydon and Sutton)
Party	Candidate	1st round		2nd round			1st round votesTransfer votes, 2nd round
Party	Candidate	Total	Of round	Transfers	Total	Of round	1st round votesTransfer votes, 2nd round
Conservative	Boris Johnson	85,480	49.1%				
Labour	Ken Livingstone	50,098	28.8%				
Liberal Democrats	Brian Paddick	20,811	11.9%				
BNP	Richard Barnbrook	5,845	3.36%				
Green	Siân Berry	3,993	2.29%				
Christian Choice	Alan Craig	3,463	1.99%				
UKIP	Gerard Batten	2,158	1.24%				
English Democrat	Matt O'Connor	1,035	0.594%				
Left List	Lindsey German	788	0.452%				
Independent	Winston McKenzie	505	0.29%				
Turnout		176,754	49.1%				
Registered electors		360,221					

2004 London mayoral election (Croydon and Sutton)
Party	Candidate	1st round		2nd round			1st round votesTransfer votes, 2nd round
Party	Candidate	Total	Of round	Transfers	Total	Of round	1st round votesTransfer votes, 2nd round
Conservative	Steve Norris	46,017	33.3%				
Labour	Ken Livingstone	42,720	30.9%				
Liberal Democrats	Simon Hughes	24,145	17.5%				
UKIP	Frank Maloney	10,633	7.69%				
BNP	Julian Leppert	4,369	3.16%				
CPA	Ram Gidoomal	4,197	3.03%				
Green	Darren Johnson	3,195	2.31%				
Respect	Lindsey German	1,937	1.4%				
Independent	Tammy Nagalingam	545	0.394%				
Independent Working Class Action	Lorna Reid	536	0.388%				
Turnout		141,969	37.7%				
Registered electors		376,175					

2000 London mayoral election (Croydon and Sutton)
Party	Candidate	1st round		2nd round			1st round votesTransfer votes, 2nd round
Party	Candidate	Total	Of round	Transfers	Total	Of round	1st round votesTransfer votes, 2nd round
Independent	Ken Livingstone	41,818	32.9%				
Conservative	Steve Norris	41,794	32.9%				
Liberal Democrats	Susan Kramer	18,331	14.4%				
Labour	Frank Dobson	12,399	9.75%				
CPA	Ram Gidoomal	4,925	3.87%				
BNP	Michael Newland	2,389	1.88%				
Green	Darren Johnson	2,201	1.73%				
UKIP	Damian Hockney	1,578	1.24%				
Independent	Ashwin Kumar	716	0.563%				
Pro-Motorist Small Shop	Geoffrey Ben-Nathan	647	0.509%				
Natural Law	Geoffrey Clements	309	0.243%				
Turnout		129,816	35.6%				
Registered electors		364,764					
