= Enfield and Haringey (London Assembly constituency) =

- Territorial constituency for the London Assembly
- Enfield and Haringey shown within London
- Created: 2000
- Number of members: One
- Member: Joanne McCartney
- Party: Labour
- Last election: 2024
- Next election: 2028

Enfield and Haringey is a constituency represented in the London Assembly.

It consists of the combined area of the London Borough of Enfield and the London Borough of Haringey.

== Overlapping constituencies ==
Since the 2024 general election, the Westminster constituencies that cover the area, in whole or part, are:

- Edmonton and Winchmore Hill (Labour)
- Enfield North (Labour)
- Southgate and Wood Green (Labour)
- Hornsey and Friern Barnet (Labour)
- Tottenham (Labour)

Between 2000 and 2024, the Westminster constituencies that cover the area included:

- Edmonton (Labour)
- Enfield North (Labour)
- Enfield Southgate (Labour)
- Hornsey and Wood Green (Labour)
- Tottenham (Labour)

== Mayoral election results ==
Below are the results for the candidate which received the highest share of the popular vote in the constituency at each mayoral election.

Year	Party	Candidate
2000	Independent	Ken Livingstone
2004	Labour	Ken Livingstone
2008	Labour	Ken Livingstone
2012	Labour	Ken Livingstone
2016	Labour	Sadiq Khan
2021	Labour	Sadiq Khan
2024	Labour	Sadiq Khan

2024 London mayoral election (Enfield and Haringey)
Party	Candidate	Votes	%	±%
Labour	Sadiq Khan	82,725	50.3	N/A
Conservative	Susan Hall	41,389	25.2	N/A
Green	Zoë Garbett	11,799	7.17	N/A
Liberal Democrats	Rob Blackie	7,947	4.83	N/A
Reform	Howard Cox	4,969	3.02	N/A
Independent	Andreas Michli	3,963	2.41	N/A
Independent	Natalie Campbell	3,056	1.86	N/A
SDP	Amy Gallagher	2,495	1.52	N/A
Animal Welfare	Femy Amin	2,082	1.27	N/A
Count Binface for Mayor of London	Count Binface	1,471	0.894	N/A
Independent	Tarun Ghulati	1032	0.627	N/A
Britain First	Nick Scanlon	1019	0.619	N/A
London Real	Brian Rose	579	0.352	N/A
Turnout		165,372	41.4%	−1.19%
Rejected ballots		846		
Registered electors		399,677		

2021 London mayoral election (Enfield and Haringey)
Party	Candidate	1st round		2nd round			1st round votesTransfer votes, 2nd round
Party	Candidate	Total	Of round	Transfers	Total	Of round	1st round votesTransfer votes, 2nd round
Labour	Sadiq Khan	74,646	45.8%				
Conservative	Shaun Bailey	48,101	29.5%				
Green	Siân Berry	13,600	8.35%				
Liberal Democrats	Luisa Porritt	5,903	3.62%				
Independent	Niko Omilana	3,315	2.04%				
Reclaim	Laurence Fox	2,386	1.47%				
London Real	Brian Rose	2,241	1.38%				
Rejoin EU	Richard Hewison	1,792	1.1%				
Let London Live	Piers Corbyn	1,666	1.02%				
Women's Equality	Mandu Reid	1,469	0.902%				
Count Binface for Mayor of London	Count Binface	1,452	0.892%				
Animal Welfare	Vanessa Hudson	1,091	0.67%				
Independent	Nims Obunge	1,041	0.639%				
UKIP	Peter John Gammons	782	0.48%				
Independent	Farah London	763	0.468%				
Heritage	David Kurten	726	0.446%				
SDP	Steve Kelleher	670	0.411%				
Renew	Kam Balayev	585	0.359%				
Burning Pink	Valerie Brown	345	0.212%				
Independent	Max Fosh	289	0.177%				
Turnout		172,169	42.6%				
Registered electors		404,492					

2016 London mayoral election (Enfield and Haringey)
Party	Candidate	1st round		2nd round			1st round votesTransfer votes, 2nd round
Party	Candidate	Total	Of round	Transfers	Total	Of round	1st round votesTransfer votes, 2nd round
Labour	Sadiq Khan	87,946	52.9%				
Conservative	Zac Goldsmith	45,069	27.1%				
Green	Siân Berry	10,942	6.58%				
Liberal Democrats	Caroline Pidgeon	7,041	4.23%				
UKIP	Peter Whittle	4,335	2.61%				
Women's Equality	Sophie Walker	3,835	2.31%				
Respect	George Galloway	2,095	1.26%				
Britain First	Paul Golding	1,601	0.963%				
Cannabis is Safer than Alcohol	Lee Eli Harris	1,421	0.855%				
Independent	Prince Zylinski	883	0.531%				
BNP	David Furness	764	0.46%				
One Love	Ankit Love	333	0.2%				
Turnout		170,433	45.2%				
Registered electors		377,324					

2012 London mayoral election (Enfield and Haringey)
Party	Candidate	1st round		2nd round			1st round votesTransfer votes, 2nd round
Party	Candidate	Total	Of round	Transfers	Total	Of round	1st round votesTransfer votes, 2nd round
Labour	Ken Livingstone	69,399	48.2%				
Conservative	Boris Johnson	51,787	36%				
Green	Jenny Jones	7,615	5.29%				
Liberal Democrats	Brian Paddick	5,959	4.14%				
Independent	Siobhan Benita	5,400	3.75%				
UKIP	Lawrence Webb	2,253	1.57%				
BNP	Carlos Cortiglia	1,507	1.05%				
Turnout		147,127	38.4%				
Registered electors		383,623					

2008 London mayoral election (Enfield and Haringey)
Party	Candidate	1st round		2nd round			1st round votesTransfer votes, 2nd round
Party	Candidate	Total	Of round	Transfers	Total	Of round	1st round votesTransfer votes, 2nd round
Labour	Ken Livingstone	66,683	42%				
Conservative	Boris Johnson	60,239	37.9%				
Liberal Democrats	Brian Paddick	15,622	9.83%				
Green	Siân Berry	5,729	3.61%				
BNP	Richard Barnbrook	3,293	2.07%				
Christian Choice	Alan Craig	2,857	1.8%				
Left List	Lindsey German	2,048	1.29%				
UKIP	Gerard Batten	1,363	0.858%				
English Democrat	Matt O'Connor	658	0.414%				
Independent	Winston McKenzie	415	0.261%				
Turnout		161,989	46.1%				
Registered electors		351,536					

2004 London mayoral election (Enfield and Haringey)
Party	Candidate	1st round		2nd round			1st round votesTransfer votes, 2nd round
Party	Candidate	Total	Of round	Transfers	Total	Of round	1st round votesTransfer votes, 2nd round
Labour	Ken Livingstone	49,696	41.3%				
Conservative	Steve Norris	32,701	27.2%				
Liberal Democrats	Simon Hughes	15,976	13.3%				
UKIP	Frank Maloney	6,399	5.32%				
Respect	Lindsey German	4,492	3.73%				
Green	Darren Johnson	4,170	3.46%				
BNP	Julian Leppert	3,388	2.81%				
CPA	Ram Gidoomal	2,541	2.11%				
Independent Working Class Action	Lorna Reid	660	0.548%				
Independent	Tammy Nagalingam	366	0.304%				
Turnout		124,135	36.1%				
Registered electors		343,563					

2000 London mayoral election (Enfield and Haringey)
Party	Candidate	1st round		2nd round			1st round votesTransfer votes, 2nd round
Party	Candidate	Total	Of round	Transfers	Total	Of round	1st round votesTransfer votes, 2nd round
Independent	Ken Livingstone	50,250	43%				
Conservative	Steve Norris	28,522	24.4%				
Labour	Frank Dobson	16,469	14.1%				
Liberal Democrats	Susan Kramer	12,113	10.4%				
Green	Darren Johnson	2,762	2.36%				
CPA	Ram Gidoomal	2,398	2.05%				
BNP	Michael Newland	1,967	1.68%				
UKIP	Damian Hockney	928	0.794%				
Pro-Motorist Small Shop	Geoffrey Ben-Nathan	667	0.57%				
Independent	Ashwin Kumar	475	0.406%				
Natural Law	Geoffrey Clements	369	0.316%				
Turnout		119,643	34.4%				
Registered electors		347,528					

== Assembly members ==
Election	Member	Party
2000	Nicky Gavron	Labour
2004	Joanne McCartney	Labour

== Assembly elections ==
2024 London Assembly election: Enfield and Haringey
Party	Candidate	Constituency			List		
Party	Candidate	Votes	%	±%	Votes	%	±%
Labour	Joanne McCartney	78,880	48.1	▼0.2	74,360	45.3	
Conservative	Calum McGillivray	32,778	20.0	▼5.8	33,240	20.3	
Green	Katie Knight	26,956	16.4	▲3.4	21,907	13.4	
Liberal Democrats	Guy Russo	14,284	8.7	▼1.6	12,081	7.4	
Reform	Roger Gravett	10,973	6.7	▲4.7	7,630	4.7	
Rejoin EU					4,349	2.7	
Animal Welfare					2,853	1.7	
SDP					1,830	1.1	
CPA					1,699	1.0	
Britain First					1,590	1.0	
Communist					928	0.6	
Independent	Laurence Fox				715	0.4	
Independent	Farah London				521	0.3	
Heritage					283	0.2	
Independent	Gabe Romualdo				76	0.0	
Majority		46,102	28.1	▲5.6			
Valid votes		163,871			164,062		
Invalid votes		1,336			1,195		
Turnout		165,207	41.34		165,257	41.35	
Labour hold		Swing					

2021 London Assembly election: Enfield and Haringey
Party	Candidate	Votes	%	±%
Labour	Joanne McCartney	81,620	48.3	−5.7
Conservative	Lee David-Sanders	43,626	25.8	+2.1
Green	Jarelle Francis	21,921	13.0	+3.9
Liberal Democrats	Dawn Barnes	17,363	10.3	+3.2
Reform	Deborah Cairns	3,284	2.0	New
No description	Pamela Holmes	1,020	0.6	New
Majority		37,994	22.5	−7.8
Total formal votes		168,834	98.2	−0.8
Informal votes		3,172	1.8	+0.8
Turnout		172,006	42.5	−3.1
Registered electors		404,492		+7.6
Labour hold		Swing	-7.8	

2016 London Assembly election: Enfield and Haringey
Party	Candidate	Votes	%	±%
Labour	Joanne McCartney	91,075	54.0	+2.8
Conservative	Linda Kelly	39,923	23.7	−2.1
Green	Ronald Stewart	15,409	9.1	+0.6
Liberal Democrats	Nicholas da Costa	12,038	7.1	−2.3
UKIP	Neville Watson	9,042	5.4	+2.4
All People's Party	Godson Azu	1,172	0.7	New
Majority		51,152	30.3	+4.9
Total formal votes		168,659	99.0	+0.6
Informal votes		1,660	1.0	−0.6
Turnout		170,319	45.6	+6.7
Registered electors		373,711		
Labour hold		Swing		

2012 London Assembly election: Enfield and Haringey
Party	Candidate	Votes	%	±%
Labour	Joanne McCartney	74,034	51.2	+17.9
Conservative	Andy Hemsted	37,293	25.8	−6.6
Liberal Democrats	Dawn Barnes	13,601	9.4	−5.5
Green	Peter Krakowiak	12,278	8.5	+0.6
UKIP	Peter Staveley	4,298	3.0	+0.1
BNP	Marie Nicholas	3,081	2.1	New
Majority		36,741	25.4	+24.6
Total formal votes		144,585	98.4	
Informal votes		2,288	1.6	
Turnout		146,873	38.3	−7.7
Labour hold		Swing		

2008 London Assembly election: Enfield and Haringey
Party	Candidate	Votes	%	±%
Labour	Joanne McCartney	52,665	32.5	+3.3
Conservative	Matthew Laban	51,263	31.7	+3.8
Liberal Democrats	Monica Whyte	23,550	14.6	–2.4
Green	Pete McAskie	12,473	7.7	–1.2
Christian (CPA)	Segun Johnson	5,779	3.6	+0.5
Left List	Sait Akgul	5,639	3.5	New
UKIP	Brian Hall	4,682	2.9	–6.3
English Democrat	Teresa Cannon	2,282	1.4	New
Majority		1,402	0.8	–0.5
Turnout		161,837	46.0	+12.2
Labour hold		Swing		

2004 London Assembly election: Enfield and Haringey
Party	Candidate	Votes	%	±%
Labour	Joanne McCartney	33,955	29.2	–3.0
Conservative	Peter Forrest	32,381	27.9	–1.3
Liberal Democrats	Wayne Hoban	19,720	17.0	+3.6
UKIP	Brian Hall	10,652	9.2	New
Green	Jayne Forbes	10,310	8.9	–1.1
Respect	Sait Akgul	6,855	5.9	New
CPA	Peter Wolstenholme	2,365	3.1	New
Majority		1,574	1.3	–1.7
Turnout		116,238	33.8	+3.0
Labour hold		Swing		

2000 London Assembly election: Enfield and Haringey
Party	Candidate	Votes	%	±%
Labour	Nicky Gavron	34,509	32.2	N/A
Conservative	Peter Forrest	31,207	29.2	N/A
Liberal Democrats	Sean Hooker	14,319	13.4	N/A
Independent pro-Ken Livingstone	Richard Course	12,581	11.8	N/A
Green	Peter Budge	10,761	10.0	N/A
London Socialist	Weyman Bennett	3,671	3.4	N/A
Majority		3,302	3.0	N/A
Turnout		107,048	30.8	N/A
Labour win (new seat)				
