= Greenwich and Lewisham (London Assembly constituency) =

- Territorial constituency for the London Assembly
- Greenwich and Lewisham shown within London
- Created: 2000
- Number of members: One
- Member: Len Duvall
- Party: Labour
- Last election: 2024
- Next election: 2028

Greenwich and Lewisham is a constituency represented in the London Assembly.

It consists of the combined area of the Royal Borough of Greenwich and the London Borough of Lewisham.

== Overlapping constituencies ==
In elections to Westminster it is traditionally a strong Labour-voting area, with all constituencies returning Labour MPs. Greenwich and Lewisham contains all of the following UK Parliament constituencies:

- Greenwich and Woolwich (Labour)
- Lewisham North (Labour)
- Lewisham East (Labour)

Additionally, it contains part of the following three constituencies:

- Eltham and Chislehurst (Labour)
- Erith and Thamesmead (Labour)
- Lewisham West and East Dulwich (Labour)

== Assembly members ==
Year	Member	Party
2000	Len Duvall	Labour

== Assembly election results ==
2024 London Assembly election: Greenwich and Lewisham
Party	Candidate	Constituency			List		
Party	Candidate	Votes	%	±%	Votes	%	±%
Labour	Len Duvall	80,101	49.7	▲1.4	73,773	46.1	
Green	Karin Tearle	28,294	17.6	▼0.5	24,248	15.1	
Conservative	Kieran Terry	25,960	16.1	▼5.3	25,826	16.1	
Reform	Mark Simpson	13,405	8.3	▲6.1	9,909	6.2	
Liberal Democrats	Josh Matthews	11,975	7.5	▲0.0	10,462	6.5	
Rejoin EU					4,136	2.6	
Animal Welfare					2,799	1.7	
Britain First					2,355	1.5	
CPA					2,260	1.4	
SDP					1,690	1.1	
Independent	Laurence Fox				962	0.6	
Communist					909	0.6	
Independent	Farah London				390	0.2	
Heritage					257	0.2	
Independent	Gabe Romualdo				86	0.1	
Majority		51,807	32.1	▲6.7			
Valid votes		159,735			160,062		
Invalid votes		1,343			1,047		
Turnout		161,078	40.3	▼1.7	161,109	40.3	
Labour hold		Swing		▲1.0			

2021 London Assembly election: Greenwich and Lewisham
Party	Candidate	Votes	%	±%
Labour	Len Duvall	82,048	48.3	−4.2
Conservative	Charlie Davis	38,889	22.9	+4.0
Green	Rosamund Adoo-Kissi-Debrah	30,808	18.1	+5.5
Liberal Democrats	Chris Annous	12,744	7.5	+0.6
Reform	Edward Apostolides	3,689	2.2	New
Independent	Tan Bui	1,851	1.1	New
Majority		43,159	25.4	−8.2
Total formal votes		170,029		
Informal votes		2,597		
Turnout		172,626	42.0	
Labour hold		Swing	-4.3	

2016 London Assembly election: Greenwich and Lewisham
Party	Candidate	Votes	%	±%
Labour	Len Duvall	85,753	52.5	+2.9
Conservative	Adam Thomas	30,480	18.9	−1.8
Green	Imogen Solly	20,520	12.6	+3.2
UKIP	Paul Oakley	13,686	8.4	+4.6
Liberal Democrats	Julia Fletcher	11,303	6.9	−0.2
All People's Party	Josephine Bangura	1,275	0.8	New
Majority		54,895	33.6	+4.7
Total formal votes		163,359	99.1	+0.5
Informal votes		1538	0.9	−0.5
Turnout		164,897	45,9	+7.7
Labour hold		Swing		

2012 London Assembly election: Greenwich and Lewisham
Party	Candidate	Votes	%	±%
Labour	Len Duvall	65,366	49.6	+13.4
Conservative	Alex Wilson	27,329	20.7	−4.5
Green	Roger Sedgley	12,427	9.4	−1.2
Liberal Democrats	John Russell	9,393	7.1	−5.3
People Before Profit	Barbara Raymond	6,873	5.2	New
UKIP	Paul Oakley	4,997	3.8	+1.1
BNP	Roberta Woods	3,551	2.7	New
National Front	Tess Culnane	1,816	1.4	−4.4
Majority		38,037	28.9	+17.9
Total formal votes		131,752	98.6	
Informal votes		1,907	1.4	
Turnout		133,659	37.2	−5.8
Labour hold		Swing		

2008 London Assembly election: Greenwich and Lewisham
Party	Candidate	Votes	%	±%
Labour	Len Duvall	53,174	36.2	+2.9
Conservative	Andy Jennings	37,040	25.2	+4.8
Liberal Democrats	Brian Robson	18,174	12.4	–5.2
Green	Sue Luxton	15,607	10.6	+0.2
National Front	Tess Culnane	8,509	5.8	New
Christian (CPA)	Stephen Hammond	5,079	3.5	+0.2
UKIP	Arnold Tarling	3,910	2.7	–9.7
Left List	Jennifer Jones	2,045	1.4	New
English Democrat	Joanna Munilla	1,716	1.2	New
Socialist	Chris Flood	1,587	1.1	New
Majority		16,134	11.0	–1.9
Turnout		149,238	43.0	+10.0
Labour hold		Swing	–1.0	

2004 London Assembly election: Greenwich and Lewisham
Party	Candidate	Votes	%	±%
Labour	Len Duvall	36,251	33.3	–9.3
Conservative	Gareth Bacon	22,168	20.4	–3.2
Liberal Democrats	Alexander Feakes	19,183	17.6	+0.4
UKIP	Timothy Reynolds	13,454	12.4	New
Green	Susan Luxton	11,271	10.4	–2.1
CPA	Stephen Hammond	3,619	3.3	New
Respect	Ian Page	2,825	2.6	New
Majority		14,083	12.9	–6.1
Turnout		108,771	33.0	+4.0
Labour hold		Swing		

2000 London Assembly election: Greenwich and Lewisham
Party	Candidate	Votes	%	±%
Labour	Len Duvall	40,386	42.6	N/A
Conservative	Rhodri Harris	22,401	23.6	N/A
Liberal Democrats	David Buxton	16,290	17.2	N/A
Green	Terry Liddle	11,839	12.5	N/A
London Socialist	Ian Page	3,981	4.2	N/A
Majority		17,985	19.0	N/A
Turnout		94,697	29.0	N/A
Labour win (new seat)				

== Mayoral election results ==
Below are the results for the candidate which received the highest share of the popular vote in the constituency at each mayoral election.

Year	Party	Candidate
2000	Independent	Ken Livingstone
2004	Labour	Ken Livingstone
2008	Labour	Ken Livingstone
2012	Labour	Ken Livingstone
2016	Labour	Sadiq Khan
2021	Labour	Sadiq Khan
2024	Labour	Sadiq Khan

2024 London mayoral election (Greenwich and Lewisham)
Party	Candidate	Votes	%	±%
Labour	Sadiq Khan	83,792	52.2	N/A
Conservative	Susan Hall	36,822	23	N/A
Green	Zoë Garbett	11,209	6.99	N/A
Liberal Democrats	Rob Blackie	7,713	4.81	N/A
Reform	Howard Cox	5,716	3.56	N/A
Independent	Natalie Campbell	3,502	2.18	N/A
SDP	Amy Gallagher	2,813	1.75	N/A
Britain First	Nick Scanlon	2,092	1.3	N/A
Animal Welfare	Femy Amin	1,915	1.19	N/A
Count Binface for Mayor of London	Count Binface	1,706	1.06	N/A
Independent	Andreas Michli	1,610	1	N/A
Independent	Tarun Ghulati	1033	0.644	N/A
London Real	Brian Rose	507	0.316	N/A
Turnout		161,183	40.3%	−2.45%
Rejected ballots		753		
Registered electors		399,703		+0.695%

2021 London mayoral election (Greenwich and Lewisham)
Party	Candidate	1st round		2nd round			1st round votesTransfer votes, 2nd round
Party	Candidate	Total	Of round	Transfers	Total	Of round	1st round votesTransfer votes, 2nd round
Labour	Sadiq Khan	76,731	46.5%				
Conservative	Shaun Bailey	43,306	26.2%				
Green	Siân Berry	16,322	9.89%				
Liberal Democrats	Luisa Porritt	6,291	3.81%				
Reclaim	Laurence Fox	3,358	2.03%				
Independent	Niko Omilana	2,697	1.63%				
Count Binface for Mayor of London	Count Binface	2,149	1.3%				
London Real	Brian Rose	2,089	1.27%				
Women's Equality	Mandu Reid	2,032	1.23%				
Rejoin EU	Richard Hewison	1,877	1.14%				
Let London Live	Piers Corbyn	1,448	0.877%				
UKIP	Peter John Gammons	1,159	0.702%				
Animal Welfare	Vanessa Hudson	1,101	0.667%				
Independent	Nims Obunge	885	0.536%				
Independent	Farah London	788	0.477%				
Heritage	David Kurten	782	0.474%				
SDP	Steve Kelleher	659	0.399%				
Renew	Kam Balayev	508	0.308%				
Burning Pink	Valerie Brown	423	0.256%				
Independent	Max Fosh	422	0.256%				
Turnout		172,175	42.8%				
Registered electors		402,501					

2016 London mayoral election (Greenwich and Lewisham)
Party	Candidate	1st round		2nd round			1st round votesTransfer votes, 2nd round
Party	Candidate	Total	Of round	Transfers	Total	Of round	1st round votesTransfer votes, 2nd round
Labour	Sadiq Khan	84,507	52.1%				
Conservative	Zac Goldsmith	39,141	24.1%				
Green	Siân Berry	12,452	7.68%				
Liberal Democrats	Caroline Pidgeon	7,541	4.65%				
UKIP	Peter Whittle	6,838	4.22%				
Women's Equality	Sophie Walker	4,211	2.6%				
Britain First	Paul Golding	2,290	1.41%				
Respect	George Galloway	1,878	1.16%				
Cannabis is Safer than Alcohol	Lee Eli Harris	1,450	0.894%				
BNP	David Furness	986	0.608%				
Independent	Prince Zylinski	558	0.344%				
One Love	Ankit Love	282	0.174%				
Turnout		164,982	45.3%				
Registered electors		363,864					

2012 London mayoral election (Greenwich and Lewisham)
Party	Candidate	1st round		2nd round			1st round votesTransfer votes, 2nd round
Party	Candidate	Total	Of round	Transfers	Total	Of round	1st round votesTransfer votes, 2nd round
Labour	Ken Livingstone	63,772	48.5%				
Conservative	Boris Johnson	44,093	33.5%				
Green	Jenny Jones	7,403	5.63%				
Liberal Democrats	Brian Paddick	5,752	4.37%				
Independent	Siobhan Benita	5,520	4.19%				
UKIP	Lawrence Webb	2,788	2.12%				
BNP	Carlos Cortiglia	2,276	1.73%				
Turnout		133,844	37.2%				
Registered electors		359,742					

2008 London mayoral election (Greenwich and Lewisham)
Party	Candidate	1st round		2nd round			1st round votesTransfer votes, 2nd round
Party	Candidate	Total	Of round	Transfers	Total	Of round	1st round votesTransfer votes, 2nd round
Labour	Ken Livingstone	63,043	42.8%				
Conservative	Boris Johnson	51,151	34.7%				
Liberal Democrats	Brian Paddick	15,009	10.2%				
Green	Siân Berry	5,930	4.03%				
BNP	Richard Barnbrook	5,170	3.51%				
Christian Choice	Alan Craig	3,007	2.04%				
UKIP	Gerard Batten	1,647	1.12%				
Left List	Lindsey German	1,144	0.777%				
English Democrat	Matt O'Connor	764	0.519%				
Independent	Winston McKenzie	345	0.234%				
Turnout		149,471	43%				
Registered electors		347,252					

2004 London mayoral election (Greenwich and Lewisham)
Party	Candidate	1st round		2nd round			1st round votesTransfer votes, 2nd round
Party	Candidate	Total	Of round	Transfers	Total	Of round	1st round votesTransfer votes, 2nd round
Labour	Ken Livingstone	47,850	42.5%				
Conservative	Steve Norris	22,445	19.9%				
Liberal Democrats	Simon Hughes	18,337	16.3%				
UKIP	Frank Maloney	8,707	7.73%				
BNP	Julian Leppert	4,591	4.08%				
Green	Darren Johnson	4,285	3.81%				
CPA	Ram Gidoomal	3,067	2.72%				
Respect	Lindsey German	2,130	1.89%				
Independent Working Class Action	Lorna Reid	687	0.61%				
Independent	Tammy Nagalingam	480	0.426%				
Turnout		115,628	35.1%				
Registered electors		329,450					

2000 London mayoral election (Greenwich and Lewisham)
Party	Candidate	1st round		2nd round			1st round votesTransfer votes, 2nd round
Party	Candidate	Total	Of round	Transfers	Total	Of round	1st round votesTransfer votes, 2nd round
Independent	Ken Livingstone	47,522	45.9%				
Conservative	Steve Norris	19,822	19.1%				
Labour	Frank Dobson	15,124	14.6%				
Liberal Democrats	Susan Kramer	10,880	10.5%				
Green	Darren Johnson	2,679	2.59%				
CPA	Ram Gidoomal	2,668	2.58%				
BNP	Michael Newland	2,562	2.47%				
UKIP	Damian Hockney	932	0.9%				
Independent	Ashwin Kumar	570	0.55%				
Pro-Motorist Small Shop	Geoffrey Ben-Nathan	531	0.513%				
Natural Law	Geoffrey Clements	302	0.292%				
Turnout		105,864	32.3%				
Registered electors		327,443					
