= 2004 London Assembly election =

- 10 June 2004

All 25 seats in the London Assembly 13 seats needed for majority
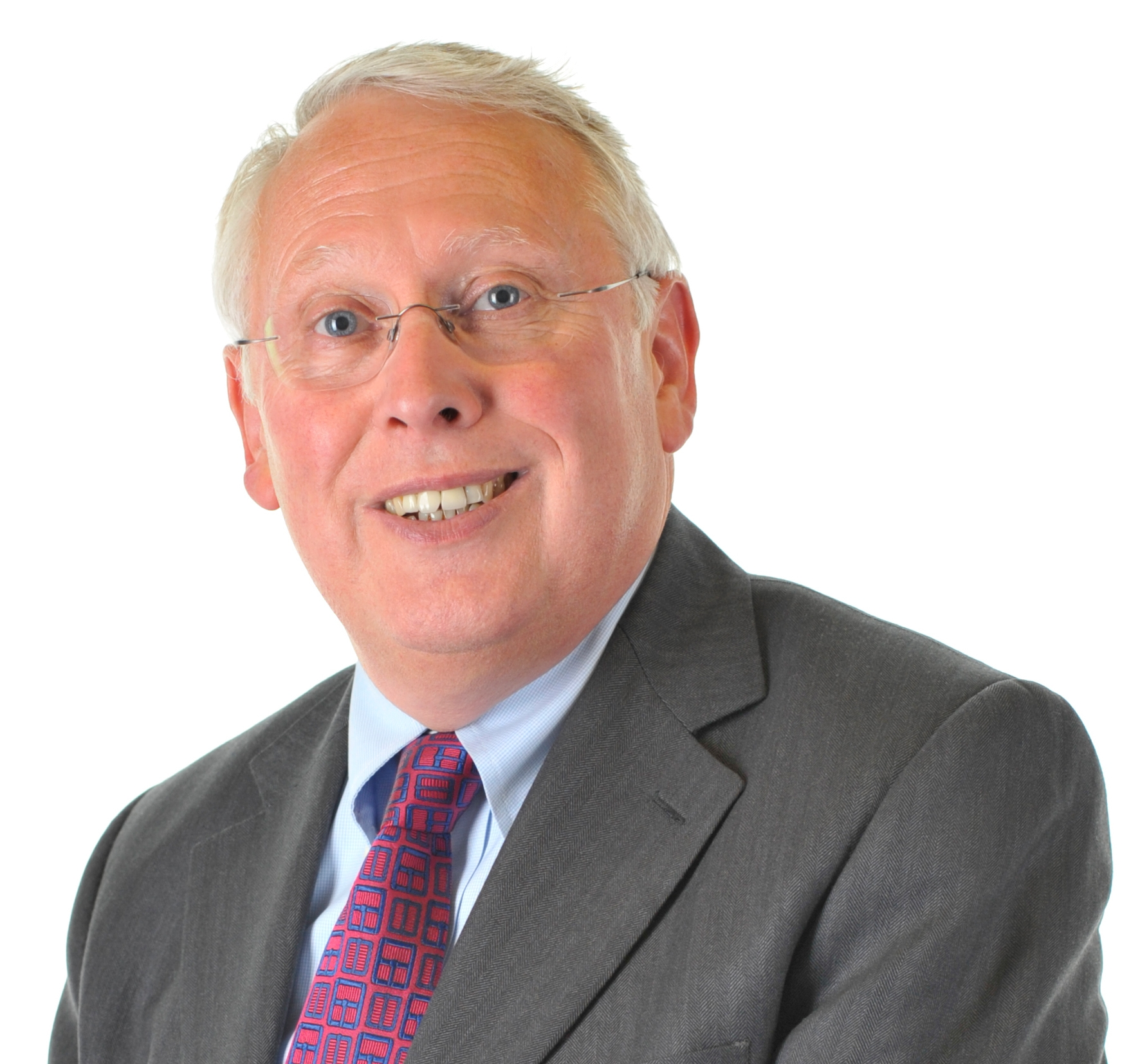

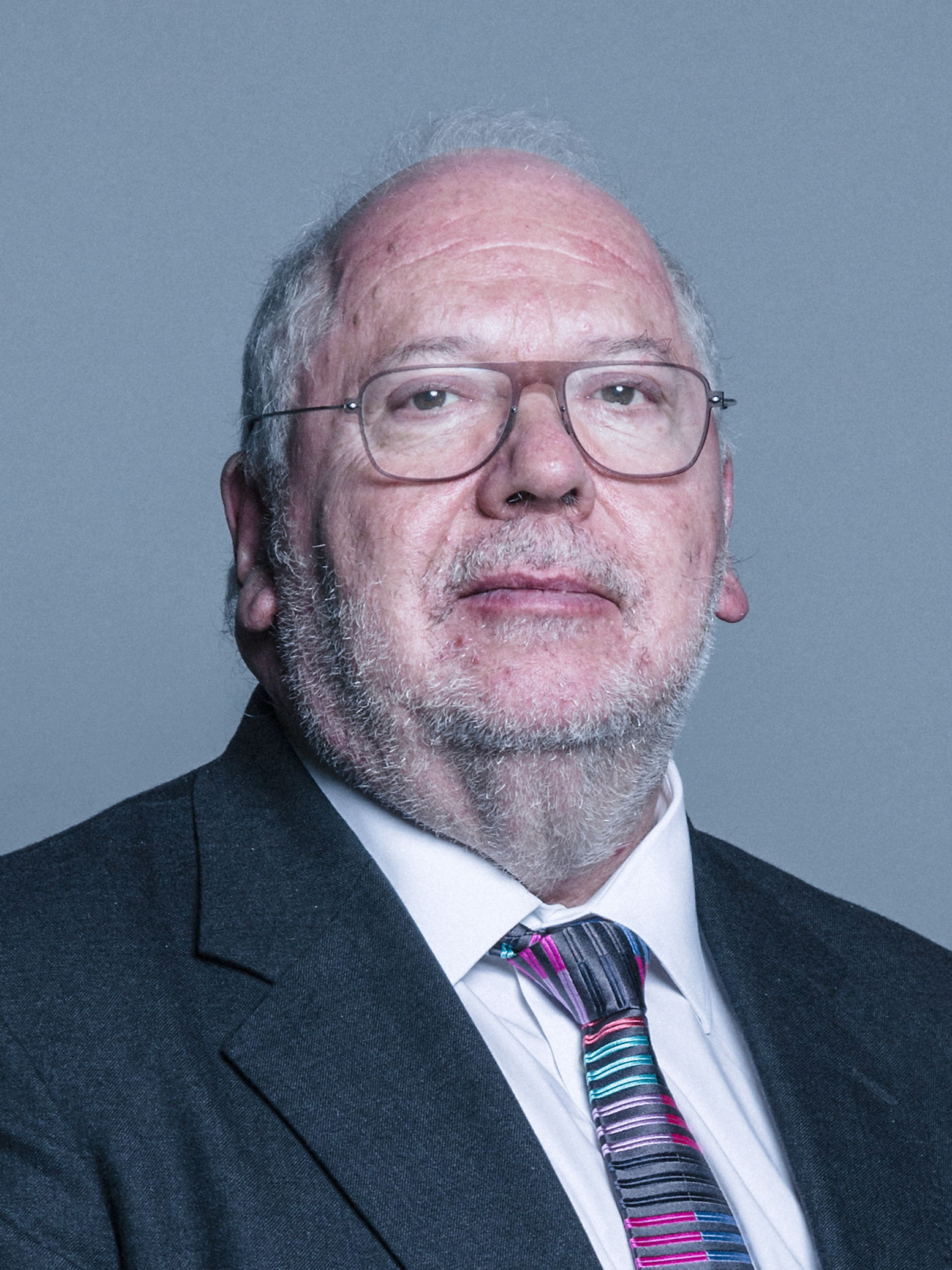

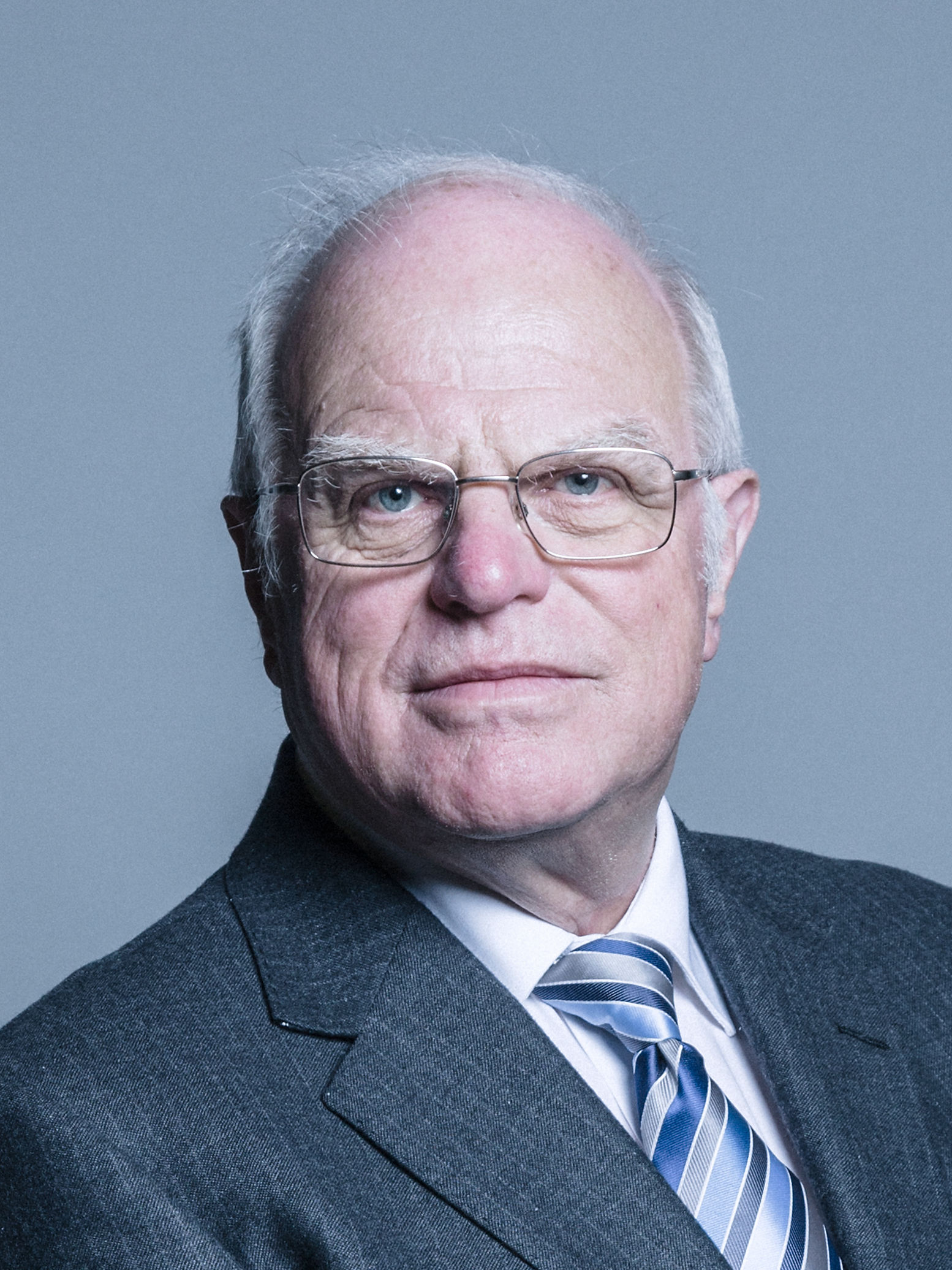

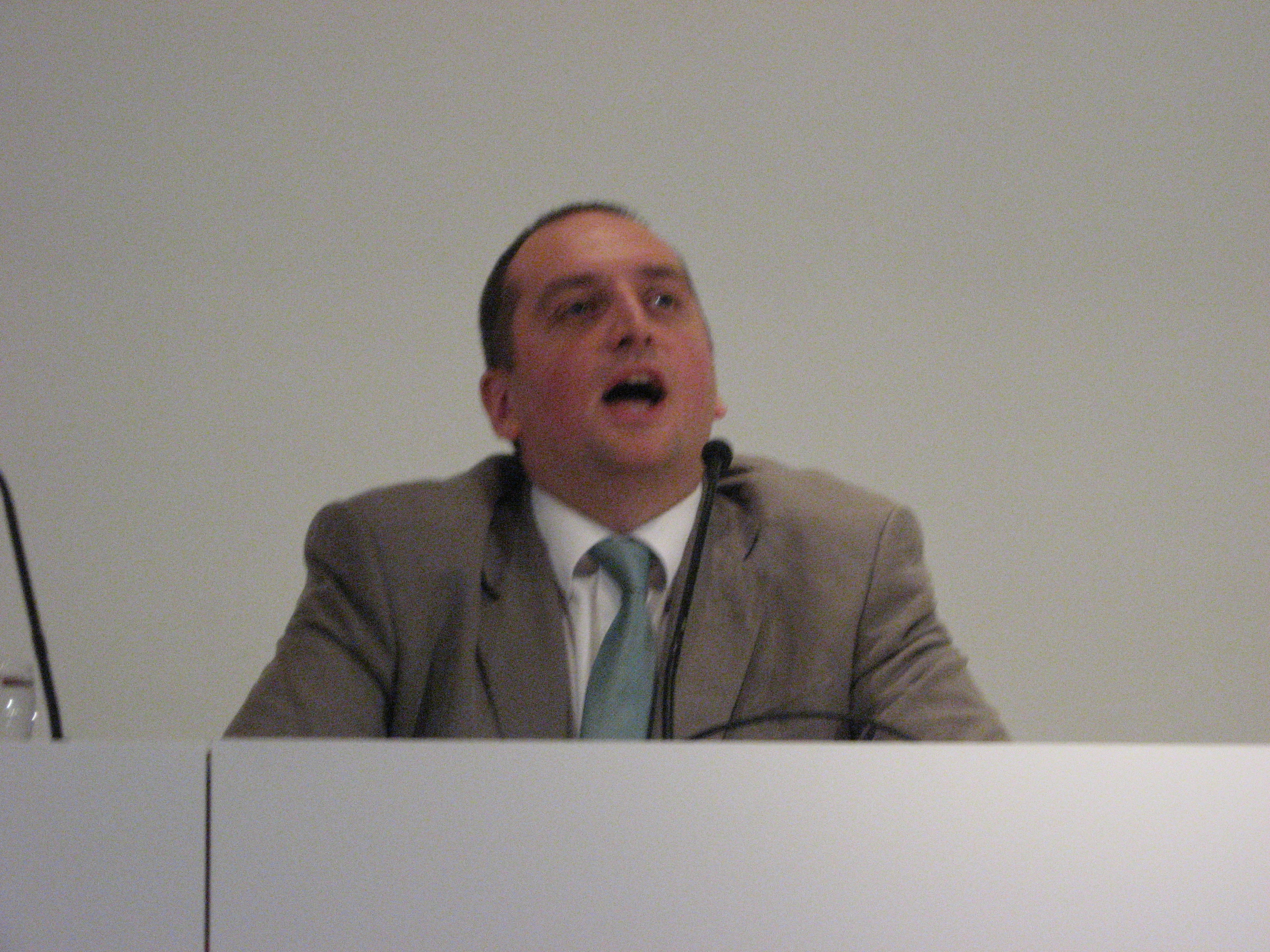
	First party	Second party
Leader	Bob Neill	Toby Harris
Party	Conservative	Labour
Leader's seat	Bexley and Bromley	Brent and Harrow (lost seat)
Last election	9 seats	9 seats
Seats won	9	7
Seat change	Steady	▼2
Constituency vote	562,047	444,808
% and swing	31.2% ▼0.2%	24.7% ▼6.9%
Party vote	533,696	468,247
% and swing	28.5% ▼0.5%	25.0% ▼5.3%
	Third party	Fourth party
Leader	Graham Tope	Darren Johnson
Party	Liberal Democrats	Green
Leader's seat	Additional member	Additional member
Last election	4 seats	3 seats
Seats won	5	2
Seat change	▲1	▼1
Constituency vote	332,237	138,242
% and swing	18.4% ▼0.5%	7.7% ▼2.6%
Party vote	316,218	160,445
% and swing	16.9% ▲2.1%	8.6% ▼2.5%
	Fifth party
Leader	Damian Hockney
Party	UKIP
Leader's seat	Additional member
Last election	0 seats
Seats won	2
Seat change	▲2
Constituency vote	180,516
% and swing	10.0% ▲9.9%
Party vote	156,780
% and swing	8.4% ▲6.3%

An election to the Assembly of London took place on 10 June 2004, along with the 2004 London mayoral election.

The Assembly is elected by the Additional Member System. There are fourteen directly elected constituencies, nine of which were won by the Conservatives and five by the Labour Party. An additional eleven members were allocated by a London wide top-up vote, with the proviso that parties must win at least 5% of the vote to qualify for list seats. This latter rule prevented both the British National Party and the Respect Party from winning a seat each as both fell just short of the 5% threshold.

This election saw losses for Labour and the Greens and gains for both the Liberal Democrats and UKIP, who achieved their first representation in the Assembly since its creation in 2000.

== Results ==

London Assembly election, 2004
Parties	Additional member system										Total seats		
Parties	Constituency					Region					Total seats		
Parties	Votes	%	+/−	Seats	+/−	Votes	%	+/−	Seats	+/−	Total	+/−	%
Conservative	562,047	31.2	▼2.0	9	▲1	533,696	28.5	▼0.5	0	▼1	9	Steady	36.0
Labour	444,808	24.7	▼6.9	5	▼1	468,247	25.0	▼5.3	2	▼1	7	▼2	28.0
Liberal Democrats	332,237	18.4	▼0.5	0	Steady	316,218	16.9	▲2.1	5	▲1	5	▲1	20.0
Green	138,242	7.7	▼2.5	0	Steady	160,445	8.6	▼2.5	2	▼1	2	▼1	8.0
UKIP	180,516	10.0	▲9.9	0	Steady	156,780	8.4	▲6.3	2	▲2	2	▲2	8.0
BNP	-	-	-	-	-	90,365	4.8	▲1.9	0	Steady	0	Steady	-
Respect	82,301	4.6	New	0	Steady	87,533	4.7	New	0	Steady	0	Steady	-
CPA	43,322	2.4	N/A	0	Steady	54,914	2.9	▼0.4	0	Steady	0	Steady	-
Alliance for Diversity in Community, Uppal	-	-	-	-	-	4,968	0.3	New	0	Steady	0	Steady	-
Communist	1,378	0.1	N/A	0	Steady	-	-	-	-	-	0	Steady	-
Rathy Alagaratnam	1,240	0.1	New	0	Steady	-	-	-	-	-	0	Steady	-
Others	16,446	0.9	▼4.8	0	Steady	-	-	-	-	-	0	Steady	-
Total	1,802,537			14		1,873,166			11		25		

Constituency Vote
Conservative	31.2%
Labour	24.7%
Liberal Democrats	18.4%
UKIP	10.0%
Green	7.7%
Respect	4.6%
CPA	2.4%
Others	1.1%

Regional Vote
Conservative	28.5%
Labour	25.0%
Liberal Democrats	16.9%
Green	8.6%
UKIP	8.4%
BNP	4.8%
Respect	4.7%
CPA	2.9%
Others	0.3%

Assembly seats
Conservative	36.0%
Labour	28.0%
Liberal Democrats	20.0%
Green	8.0%
UKIP	8.0%

The Conservative Party gained Brent and Harrow from Labour (who lost 7.6% of their vote), however they lost it again in the 2008 election. There were also large swings away from Labour in Barnet and Camden, City and East, Ealing and Hillingdon, Greenwich and Lewisham, Havering and Redbridge and West Central. The Liberal Democrats lost votes in most constituencies, but made gains in Enfield and Haringey, Lambeth and Southwark and Merton and Wandsworth. UKIP gained large percentages of the vote in Bexley and Bromley, Croydon and Sutton, Greenwich and Lewisham and Havering and Redbridge.

- Overall turnout: 36.97%

== London Assembly representation ==
Party	Seats	Loss/Gain
Conservative	9	±0
Labour	7	–2
Liberal Democrats	5	+1
Green	2	–1
UKIP	2	+2
Total	25	

=== New members ===
- Bob Blackman (Conservative Party, Brent and Harrow)
- Dee Doocey (Liberal Democrats, London list)
- Damian Hockney (UK Independence Party, London list)
- Peter Hulme-Cross (UK Independence Party, London list)
- Joanne McCartney (Labour Party, Enfield and Haringey)
- Murad Qureshi (Labour Party, London list)

=== Defeated members ===
- Toby Harris (Labour Party, Brent and Harrow)
- Samantha Heath (Labour Party, London list)
- Noel Lynch (Green Party of England and Wales, London list)
- Eric Ollerenshaw (Conservative Party, London list)

=== Retiring members ===
- Meg Hillier (Labour Party, North East)
- Diana Johnson (Labour Party, London list)

=== Constituency Candidates ===
Constituency	Conservative	Labour	Lib Dem	Green	UKIP	Respect	CPA	Others
Barnet & Camden	Brian Coleman (47,640, 1st)	Lucy Anderson (36,121, 2nd)	Jonathan Simpson (23,603, 3rd)	Miranda Dunn (11,921, 4th)	Magnus Nielsen (8,685, 5th)	Elisabeth Wheatley (5,150, 6th)		
Bexley & Bromley	Bob Neill (64,246, 1st)	Charlie Mansell (24,848, 4th)	Duncan Borrowman (29,992, 2nd)	Ann Garrett (8,069, 5th)	Heather Bennett (26,703, 3rd)	Alun Morinan (1,673, 7th)	Miranda Suit (3,397, 6th)	
Brent & Harrow	Bob Blackman (39,900, 1st)	Toby Harris (35,214, 2nd)	Havard Hughes (20,782, 3rd)	Mohammad Ali (6,975, 5th)	Daniel Moss (7,199, 4th)	Albert Harriott (4,586, 6th)	Gladstone Macaulay (2,734, 7th)	
City & East	Shafi Choudhury (23,749, 2nd)	John Biggs (38,085, 1st)	Guy Burton (18,255, 4th)	Terry McGrenera (8,687, 6th)	Christopher Pratt (17,997, 5th)	Oliur Rahman (19,675, 3rd)	Christopher Gill (4,461, 7th)	
Croydon & Sutton	Andrew Pelling (52,330, 1st)	Sean Fitzsimons (25,861, 3rd)	Steve Gauge (28,636, 2nd)	Shasha Khan (6,175, 5th)	James Feisenberger (15,203, 4th)	Waqas Hussain (3,108, 7th)	David Campanale (4,234, 6th)	
Ealing & Hillingdon	Richard Barnes (45,230, 1st)	Gurcharan Singh (34,214, 2nd)	Mike Cox (23,440, 3rd)	Sarah Edwards (9,395, 5th)	David Malindine (14,698, 4th)	Salvinder Dhillon (4,229, 7th)	Genevieve Hibbs (3,024, 8th)	Dalawar Chaudhry (Ind) (5,285, 6th)
Enfield & Haringey	Peter Forrest (32,381, 2nd)	Joanne McCartney (33,955, 1st)	Wayne Hoban (19,720, 3rd)	Jayne Forbes (10,310, 5th)	Brian Hall (10,652, 4th)	Sait Akgul (6,855, 6th)	Peter Wolstenholme (2,365, 7th)	
Greenwich & Lewisham	Gareth Bacon (22,168, 2nd)	Len Duvall (36,251, 1st)	Alexander Feakes (19,183, 3rd)	Susan Luxton (11,271, 5th)	Timothy Reynolds (13,454, 4th)	Ian Page (2,825, 7th)	Stephen Hammond (3,619, 6th)	
Havering & Redbridge	Roger Evans (44,723, 1st)	Keith Darvill (28,017, 2nd)	Matthew Lake (13,646, 4th)	Ashley Gunstock (6,009, 6th)	Lawrence Webb (18,297, 3rd)	Abdurahman Jafar (5,185, 7th)	Juliet Hawkins (2,917, 8th)	Malvin Brown (Res. Assoc. London) (6,925, 5th); David Stephens (Nat. Lib.) (2,031, 9th); Peter Thorogood (Ind) (1,597, 10th)
Lambeth & Southwark	Bernard Gentry (17,379, 3rd)	Val Shawcross (36,280, 1st)	Caroline Pidgeon (30,805, 2nd)	Shane Collins (11,900, 4th)	Frank Maloney (8,776, 5th)	Janet Noble (4,930, 6th)	Simisola Lawanson (3,655, 7th)	
Merton & Wandsworth	Elizabeth Howlett (48,295, 1st)	Kathryn Smith (31,417, 2nd)	Andrew Martin (17,864, 3rd)	Roy Vickery (10,163, 4th)	Adrian Roberts (8,327, 5th)	Ruairidh Maclean (4,297, 6th)	Ellen Greco (2,782, 7th)	Rathy Alagaratnam (Ind) (1,240, 8th)
North East	Andrew Boff (23,264, 3rd)	Jennette Arnold (37,380, 1st)	Terry Stacy (24,042, 2nd)	Jon Nott (16,739, 4th)	R. J. Selby (11,459, 5th)	D. R. E. Ryan (11,184, 6th)	A. A. Otchie (3,219, 7th)	J. I. Beavis (CPB) (1,378, 7th)
South West	Tony Arbour (48,858, 1st)	Seema Malhotra (25,225, 3rd)	Dee Doocey (44,791, 2nd)	Judy Maciejowska (9,866, 5th)	A. G. Hindle (12,477, 4th)	O. M. Waraich (3,785, 6th)	P. J. Flower (3,008, 7th)	
West Central	Angie Bray (51,884, 1st)	Ansuya Sodha (21,940, 2nd)	Francesco Fruzza (17,478, 3rd)	Julia Stephenson (10,762, 4th)	Damian Hockney (7,219, 5th)	Kevin Cobham (4,825, 6th)	Jillian McLachlan (1,993, 7th)	
Source: London Elects

=== London-wide lists ===
2004 London Assembly election: Additional members
List	Candidates	Votes	Of total (%)	± from prev.
Conservative	Eric Ollerenshaw, Andrew Boff, Rebekah Gilbert, Victoria Borwick, Bob Blackman, William Norton, Reza Choudhury, Joseph Cormach, Adrian Knowles, Gareth Bacon, Bernard Gentry, Andrew Retter, Tony Cox, Philip Briscoe, Yvonne Rivlin, Lionel Zetter, David Williams, Jonathan Gough, Matthew Laban, Simon Jones, Sean Fear, Darshan Suri	533,696	28.5	▼0.49
Labour	Nicky Gavron, Murad Qureshi, John Biggs, Len Duvall, Jennette Arnold, Val Shawcross, Joanne McCartney, Navin Shah, Ranjit Dheer, Balvinder Saund, Leonie Cooper, Ansuya Sodha, Shafi Khan, Alex Heslop	468,247	25.0	▼5.3
Liberal Democrats	Lynne Featherstone, Graham Tope, Sally Hamwee, Michael Tuffrey, Dee Doocey, Geoff Pope, Duncan Borrowman, Monroe Palmer, Baron Palmer of Childs Hill, Meral Ece, Steven Gauge, Christopher Noyce	316,218	16.9	▲2.1
Green	Jenny Jones, Darren Johnson, Noel Lynch, Keith Magnum, Danny Bates, Shane Collins, Ruth Jenkins, Mischa Borris, Thomas Walsh, Ashley Gunstock	160,445	8.6	▼2.5
UKIP	Damian Hockney, Peter Hulme-Cross, Adrian Roberts, Paul Cronin, Lawrence Webb, Robin Lambert, John Dunford, Ralph Steven Atkinson, Frederick James Rolph, Daniel William Moss, Heather Ann Bennett	156,780	8.4	▲6.3
BNP	Jason Paul Douglas, Barry John Roberts, Julian Peter Leppert, Richard Barnbrook, Mary Teresa Culnane, Clifford John Le May, Alan Herbert Bailey, Anthony Young, Lawrence Rustem, Carlos Cortiglia, Gareth William Jones	90,365	4.8	▲2.0
Respect	Lindsey German, Oliur Rahmanm, Linda Smith, Janet Noble, Sait Akgul, Salvinder Dhillon, Michael Rosen, Gregory Tucker, Tansy Hoskins, Kevin Cobham, Abdurahman Jafar	87,533	4.7	New
CPA	Ram Gidoomal, David Bruno Campanale, Alan Craig, Gladstone Olufemi Macaulay, Peter James Flower, Susan Jane May, Genevieve Mary Hibbs, Juliet Frances Hawkins, Peter Hartley Wolstenholme, Jillian Mary Mclachlan, Ellen Sheila Greco	54,914	2.9	▼0.39
Alliance for Diversity in Community, Uppal	Inder Singh Uppal, Vasudev Kalidas Patel, Pritpal Singh Gahbri	4,968	0.3	New
