= Archway (ward) =

- Former electoral ward for the Haringey London Borough Council
- Borough: Haringey
- County: Greater London

Former electoral ward
- Created: 1978
- Abolished: 2002
- Councillors: 2

Archway was an electoral ward in the London Borough of Haringey from 1978 to 2002. The ward was first used in the 1978 elections and last used for the 1998 elections. It returned councillors to Haringey London Borough Council.

== Haringey council elections ==
There was a very minor adjustment of the ward boundaries on 1 April 1994.

=== 1998 election ===
The election took place on 7 May 1998.

1998 Haringey London Borough Council election: Archway (2)
Party	Candidate	Votes	%	±%
Labour	Judith Bax	891	45.5	−1.0
Labour	Nicky Gavron	868	44.3	−12.6
Conservative	Roderick Allen	644	32.9	+3.6
Conservative	Michael Flynn	605	30.9	+5.1
Liberal Democrats	Jonathan Bloch	283	14.4	−3.8
Liberal Democrats	Roger Mothersdale	240	12.3	N/A
Green	Sally Child	183	9.3	−4.6
Turnout		1,971	37.3	−10.2
Labour hold		Swing		
Labour hold		Swing		

=== 1994 election ===
The election took place on 5 May 1994.

1994 Haringey London Borough Council election: Archway (2)
Party	Candidate	Votes	%	±%
Labour	Nicky Gavron	1,331	46.43	▲12.00
Labour	Derek Wyatt	1,088		
Conservative	Michael D. Cook	685	24.75	▼11.67
Conservative	Nityanand Ragnuth	605		
Liberal Democrats	Rodney J. Rezler	426	16.35	▲6.41
Green	Allison MacDougall	325	12.47	▲0.08
Registered electors		4,937		▲2
Turnout		2,347	47.54	▼4.68
Rejected ballots		6	0.26	▲0.07
Labour hold				
Labour gain from Conservative				

=== 1990 election ===
The election took place on 3 May 1990.

1990 Haringey London Borough Council election: Archway (2)
Party	Candidate	Votes	%	±%
Labour	Nicky Gavron	1,072	34.43	
Conservative	Andrew Broadhurst	1,045	36.42	
Conservative	Helen Roche	1,036		
Labour	David Billingsley	896		
Green	Martin Girven	354	12.39	
Liberal Democrats	Roger Mothersdale	284	9.94	
SDP	David Sargeant	195	6.82	
Registered electors		4,935		
Turnout		2577	52.22	
Rejected ballots		5	0.19	
Labour hold				
Conservative hold				

=== 1986 election ===
The election took place on 8 May 1986.

1986 Haringey London Borough Council election: Archway (2)
Party	Candidate	Votes	%	±%
Labour	Nicky Gavron	1,045	37.2	+10.1
Conservative	Ronald Embleton	986	35.1	−8.4
Labour	Stephen Mackey	972	34.6	+8.4
Conservative	Sarah Whitby	951	33.8	−8.9
Alliance (SDP)	Roger Mothersdale	595	21.2	−4.1
Alliance (Liberal)	Jonathan Hobbs	592	21.1	−2.9
Green	Paul Butler	167	5.9	+2.8
Turnout		2,810	52.3	−1.4
Labour gain from Conservative		Swing		
Conservative hold		Swing		

=== 1982 election ===
The election took place on 6 May 1982.

1982 Haringey London Borough Council election: Archway (2)
Party	Candidate	Votes	%	±%
Conservative	Alistair Burt	1,157	43.5	−4.8
Conservative	Sarah Whitby	1,137	42.7	−5.8
Labour	Rosemary Elworthy	722	27.1	−13.4
Labour	Jeremy Short	696	26.2	−12.9
Alliance (SDP)	Faith Davey	672	25.3	+17.2
Alliance (Liberal)	Elizabeth Harrington	638	24.0	N/A
Ecology	Glenys Parry	82	3.1	N/A
Turnout		2,661	53.7	+8.7
Conservative hold		Swing		
Conservative hold		Swing		

=== 1978 election ===
The election took place on 4 May 1978.

1978 Haringey London Borough Council election: Archway (2)
Party	Candidate	Votes	%	±%
Conservative	Sarah Whitby	1,186	48.5	
Conservative	Antony Franchi	1,179	48.3	
Labour	Willisford Pilgrim	989	40.5	
Labour	David Barlow	954	39.1	
Liberal	Hope Malik	197	8.1	
National Front	Hilda Giddings	34	1.4	
National Front	Paul Vanderstay	27	1.1	
Turnout		2,443	45.0	
Conservative win (new seat)				
Conservative win (new seat)				
