= Steve O'Connell =

British Conservative politician

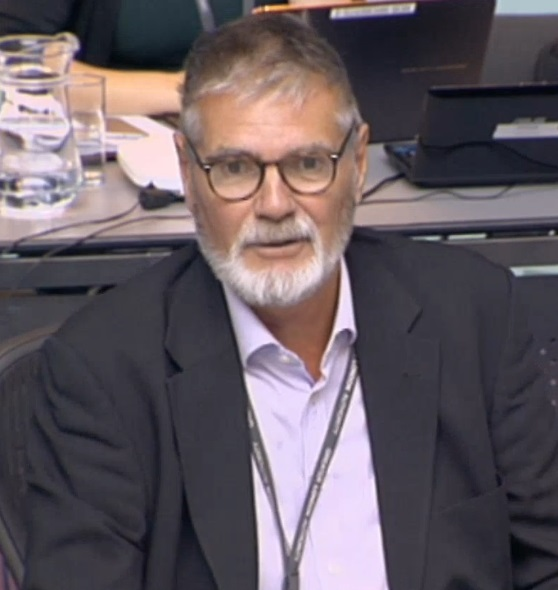

Member of the London Assembly for Croydon and Sutton
- In office 1 May 2008 – 8 May 2021
- Preceded by: Andrew Pelling
- Succeeded by: Neil Garratt
- Majority: 9,418

Personal details
- Born: Stephen O'Connell; 9 September 1956 (age 69) Dulwich, London, England
- Party: Conservative

Stephen O'Connell (born 9 September 1956) is a British Conservative politician. He was a member of the London Assembly for Croydon and Sutton from 2008 until 2021 and a councillor in Croydon for Kenley from 2002 until 2021.

O'Connell grew up in South London and attended Brockley County Grammar School. He qualified as a mortgage broker and financial advisor and worked in banking, including 28 years at Barclays Bank as well as at HSBC and NatWest. He was first elected to Croydon Council in 2002 for Kenley Ward. He served as Deputy Leader of the Conservative Group and when his party took control of the Council in 2006 he became Deputy Leader with responsibility for safety and cohesion.

He was elected to the London Assembly in May 2008. He kept his position in Croydon Council's cabinet but stepped down as Deputy Leader. He was a member of the Metropolitan Police Authority. After its abolition, he was appointed an adviser to Stephen Greenhalgh the Deputy Mayor for Policing and Crime, in the Mayor's Office for Policing and Crime.

He retired from the London Assembly and stood down from Croydon Council in 2021.
