= 1994 Haringey London Borough Council election =

1994 local election in England

- 5 May 1994

All 59 seats up for election to Haringey London Borough Council 30 seats needed for a majority
- Registered: 138,416
- Turnout: 59,790, 43.19% (▼3.41)

	First party	Second party	Third party
Leader	Toby Harris	Unknown	Unknown
Party	Labour	Conservative	Liberal Democrats
Leader since	1987	Unknown	Unknown
Leader's seat	Hornsey Central	Unknown	Unknown
Last election	42 seats, 47.57%	17 seats, 37.02	0 seats, 7.52%
Seats before	43	16	0
Seats won	57	2	0
Seat change	▲14	▼14	Steady
Popular vote	88,253	34,004	18,214
Percentage	60.08%	23.15%	12.40%
Swing	▲12.51	▼13.87	▲4.88
Council control before election
Labour
Council control after election
Labour

The 1994 Haringey Council election took place on 5 May 1994 to elect members of Haringey London Borough Council in London, England. The whole council was up for election and the Labour Party stayed in overall control of the council.

== Election result ==
Haringey London Borough Council Election Result 1994
Party	Seats	Gains	Losses	Net gain/loss	Seats %	Votes %	Votes	+/−
Labour	57	14	0	▲14	96.61	60.08	88,253	▲12.51
Conservative	2	0	14	▼14	3.39	23.15	34,004	▼13.87
Liberal Democrats	0	0	0	Steady	0.00	12.40	18,214	▲4.88
Green	0	0	0	Steady	0.00	4.07	5,970	▼2.40
Independent	0	0	0	Steady	0.00	0.30	443	▲0.16
Total	59						146,884	

== Ward results ==
=== Alexandra ===
Alexandra (3)
Party	Candidate	Votes	%	±%
Labour	Catherine Craig*	1,798	50.2	+12.6
Labour	Mary Neuner*	1,698	47.4	+12.0
Labour	Christakis Zissimos**	1,448	40.4	+4.8
Liberal Democrats	Juliet Solomon	995	27.8	+4.6
Conservative	Anthony Keogh	848	23.7	−10.3
Liberal Democrats	Nigel Bass	827	23.1	+0.7
Conservative	Barry Gibb	823	23.0	−8.5
Liberal Democrats	John Fynaut	801	22.4	+0.8
Conservative	Stephen Bulfield	789	22.0	−9.3
Green	Douglas Hodge	397	11.1	−1.2
Turnout		3,588	56.1	−2.7
Labour hold				
Labour hold				
Labour hold				

Christakis Zissimos was a sitting councillor for Harringay ward.

=== Archway ===
Archway (2)
Party	Candidate	Votes	%	±%
Labour	Felicia Gavron*	1,331	56.9	+15.2
Labour	Derek Wyatt	1,088	46.5	+11.7
Conservative	Michael Cook	685	29.3	−11.3
Conservative	Nityanand Ragnuth	605	25.8	−14.5
Liberal Democrats	Rodney Rezler	426	18.2	+7.2
Green	Allison MacDougall	325	13.9	+0.1
Turnout		2,347	47.5	−4.7
Labour hold				
Labour gain from Conservative				

=== Bowes Park ===
Bowes Park (3)
Party	Candidate	Votes	%	±%
Labour	Vivienne Manheim*	1,984	55.1	+13.4
Labour	Lucinda Arnold	1,946	54.1	+15.0
Labour	Narayanan Sisupalan	1,713	47.6	+15.2
Conservative	Juliet Donnelly*	944	26.2	−17.5
Conservative	Sylvia Skipper*	855	23.8	−18.9
Conservative	Ian Johnston	847	23.5	−16.8
Liberal Democrats	David Beacham	432	12.0	+2.0
Liberal Democrats	Julia Glenn	400	11.1	N/A
Liberal Democrats	Nigel Scott	356	9.9	N/A
Green	James Barty	324	9.0	−4.9
Green	Jeremy Dann	249	6.9	N/A
Turnout		3,608	46.0	−1.4
Labour hold				
Labour gain from Conservative				
Labour gain from Conservative				

=== Bruce Grove ===
Bruce Grove (3)
Party	Candidate	Votes	%	±%
Labour	Stephen Brasher*	1,739	67.8	+18.6
Labour	Seamus Carey*	1,734	67.6	+16.6
Labour	Kyriakos Fiakkas	1,600	62.4	+11.4
Conservative	Colleen Maclaren	320	12.5	−8.6
Green	Rosemary Bridger	312	12.2	−9.1
Conservative	Jace Maclaren	295	11.5	N/A
Conservative	Iain Paston	287	11.2	N/A
Liberal Democrats	Attila Borzak	226	8.8	−2.5
Liberal Democrats	Marjorie Simmons	210	8.2	N/A
Liberal Democrats	Alexander Myles	201	7.8	N/A
Turnout		2,566	37.3	−3.4
Labour hold				
Labour hold				
Labour hold				

=== Coleraine ===
Coleraine (3)
Party	Candidate	Votes	%	±%
Labour	Maureen Dewar*	1,816	58.4	+10.4
Labour	Reginald Rice*	1,653	53.1	+7.7
Labour	George Meehan*	1,633	52.5	+6.8
Liberal Democrats	Alex L'Estrange	1,110	35.7	−1.9
Liberal Democrats	Philip Lewis	893	28.7	−1.5
Liberal Democrats	Mo Chadirchi	866	27.8	−2.1
Green	Peter McAskie	220	7.1	−2.0
Turnout		3,128	43.2	−3.0
Labour hold				
Labour hold				
Labour hold				

=== Crouch End ===
Crouch End (3)
Party	Candidate	Votes	%	±%
Labour	Errol Dickerson	1,585	50.5	+11.7
Labour	Charles Sharp	1,580	50.3	+14.1
Labour	Nigel Willmott	1,545	49.2	+18.2
Conservative	Ronald Aitken*	849	27.0	−15.6
Conservative	Catherine Circus	786	25.0	−15.6
Conservative	Edward Webb	725	23.1	−15.6
Liberal Democrats	Mark Malcolmson	491	15.6	+8.9
Liberal Democrats	Denny John	484	15.4	N/A
Green	Ivan Lambert	463	14.7	−0.3
Liberal Democrats	Marc Thomas	434	13.8	N/A
Turnout		3,140	46.4	−5.7
Labour gain from Conservative				
Labour gain from Conservative				
Labour hold				

=== Fortis Green ===
Fortis Green (3)
Party	Candidate	Votes	%	±%
Labour	Thomas Davidson	1,303	43.2	+9.9
Labour	David Billingsley	1,294	42.9	+10.2
Labour	Mavis Lambie	1,189	39.4	+11.4
Conservative	David Allen	1,018	33.8	−14.8
Conservative	Roger Dix*	1,011	33.5	−15.7
Conservative	Caroline Elderfield**	935	31.0	−16.8
Liberal Democrats	Walter Bealby	569	18.9	+8.8
Liberal Democrats	Frank Heller	527	17.5	+8.3
Green	Peter Budge	440	14.6	−3.1
Turnout		3,020	45.5	−4.5
Labour gain from Conservative				
Labour gain from Conservative				
Labour gain from Conservative				

Caroline Elderfield was a sitting councillor for Crouch End ward.

=== Green Lanes ===
Green Lanes (2)
Party	Candidate	Votes	%	±%
Labour	Neil Cleeveley*	1,265	69.6	+18.0
Labour	Kerry Postlewhite	1,217	67.0	+11.5
Conservative	Jean Farmer	284	15.6	−17.9
Conservative	Leo Salim	218	12.0	−19.0
Green	Peter Corley	193	10.6	−1.1
Liberal Democrats	Susan Traynor	187	10.3	+3.6
Turnout		1,820	37.5	−6.8
Labour hold				
Labour hold				

=== Harringay ===
Harringay (3)
Party	Candidate	Votes	%	±%
Labour	Gina Adamou*	1,913	71.7	+12.5
Labour	Peter Daly	1,852	69.4	+16.3
Labour	Ronald Blanchard*	1,821	68.2	+5.8
Conservative	Doris Berry	392	14.7	−12.2
Conservative	Ann Harvey-Kirkwood	363	13.6	−12.4
Liberal Democrats	Jeanette Jamieson	347	13.0	+4.4
Conservative	Kenneth King	324	12.1	−12.9
Liberal Democrats	Martin Palmer	292	10.9	N/A
Turnout		2,682	40.0	+3.2
Labour hold				
Labour hold				
Labour hold				

=== High Cross ===
High Cross (2)
Party	Candidate	Votes	%	±%
Labour	David Coats**	1,181	67.6	+13.8
Labour	Isidoros Diakides	1,061	60.8	+15.6
Conservative	David Harris	361	20.7	−9.1
Conservative	Andrea Harris	359	20.6	−5.8
Liberal Democrats	Jonathan Perkins	229	13.1	+4.1
Turnout		1,748	37.1	−3.0
Labour hold				
Labour hold				

David Coats was a sitting councillor for Alexandra ward.

=== Highgate ===
Highgate (2)
Party	Candidate	Votes	%	±%
Conservative	Pamela Steele*	918	47.8	−9.4
Conservative	Peter Forrest	904	47.1	−9.9
Labour	Esme Chandler	663	34.5	+9.3
Labour	Paul Sharma	553	28.8	+6.5
Liberal Democrats	Lynne Featherstone	353	18.4	+10.8
Green	Paul Butler	202	10.5	−1.0
Turnout		1,925	42.8	−5.3
Conservative hold				
Conservative hold				

=== Hornsey Central ===
Hornsey Central (2)
Party	Candidate	Votes	%	±%
Labour	Toby Harris*	1,573	62.9	+24.2
Labour	Claire Tikly	1,475	59.0	+13.1
Conservative	Sheila Cheetham	513	20.5	−15.1
Conservative	John Kirk	505	20.2	−14.4
Liberal Democrats	Hikmat Chadirchi	290	11.6	+1.5
Green	Nicholas Connell	287	11.5	−5.9
Turnout		2,507	50.0	−2.6
Labour hold				
Labour hold				

=== Hornsey Vale ===
Hornsey Vale (2)
Party	Candidate	Votes	%	±%
Labour	Josephine Irwin*	1,396	65.4	+8.2
Labour	Simon Horne	1,357	63.6	+17.4
Liberal Democrats	Samantha Bowring	304	14.3	+8.9
Liberal Democrats	Robert Curry	265	12.4	N/A
Green	Dennis Bury	262	12.3	−6.8
Conservative	Paul Walker	258	12.1	−14.1
Conservative	David Grant	251	11.8	−13.1
Turnout		2,136	47.3	−4.0
Labour hold				
Labour hold				

=== Muswell Hill ===
Muswell Hill (3)
Party	Candidate	Votes	%	±%
Labour	Elaine Thompson	1,772	44.5	+9.7
Labour	Charles Keal	1,588	41.0	+7.0
Labour	Craig Turton	1,577	40.8	+8.7
Conservative	Blair Greaves*	1,240	32.0	−13.9
Conservative	Kenneth Mansfield	1,233	31.9	−14.5
Conservative	Alan Saggerson	1,196	30.9	−14.0
Liberal Democrats	Lindsay Northover	681	17.6	+8.1
Liberal Democrats	Ian Jardin	655	16.9	N/A
Liberal Democrats	Roderick Benziger	654	16.9	+7.3
Green	Pearl Cantile	473	12.2	−8.5
Turnout		3,877	51.3	−2.0
Labour gain from Conservative				
Labour gain from Conservative				
Labour gain from Conservative				

=== Noel Park ===
Noel Park (3)
Party	Candidate	Votes	%	±%
Labour	Alan Dobbie*	1,929	61.5	+19.9
Labour	Martyn Appadoo*	1,903	60.6	+18.7
Labour	Narendra Makanji*	1,803	57.5	+20.0
Conservative	Barbara Banfield	665	21.2	−20.7
Conservative	David Douglas	633	20.2	−19.8
Conservative	Patricia Mansfield	590	18.8	−18.1
Liberal Democrats	David Green	359	11.4	+3.7
Green	Jonathan Pinkney-Baird	334	10.6	−0.2
Independent	Michael Brosnan	179	5.7	−0.4
Independent	Denzil Rose	136	4.3	N/A
Turnout		3,148	42.7	−5.1
Labour hold				
Labour hold				
Labour gain from Conservative				

=== Park ===
Park (2)
Party	Candidate	Votes	%	±%
Labour	Ray Dodds*	1,094	57.6	+8.8
Labour	Sheila Peacock	1,064	56.1	+7.1
Conservative	Brendan Clifford-Walsh	458	24.1	−8.2
Liberal Democrats	Karen Hetherington	315	16.6	+9.1
Conservative	Anthony Savva	260	13.7	−14.4
Liberal Democrats	Jennifer Perkins	257	13.5	N/A
Turnout		1,899	39.0	−2.4
Labour hold				
Labour hold				

=== Seven Sisters ===
Seven Sisters (2)
Party	Candidate	Votes	%	±%
Labour	Frederick Knight*	1,306	76.1	+11.1
Labour	Dhiren Basu	1,232	71.8	+14.6
Conservative	Iain Dewar	206	12.0	−11.5
Liberal Democrats	Pamela Palmer	179	10.4	+4.6
Liberal Democrats	Peter Floyd	175	10.2	N/A
Conservative	Osei Akoto	173	10.1	−10.1
Turnout		1,720	35.3	−7.5
Labour hold				
Labour hold				

=== South Hornsey ===
South Hornsey (2)
Party	Candidate	Votes	%	±%
Labour	Sally Billot	1,528	72.1	+11.2
Labour	Philip Jones*	1,380	65.2	+11.4
Green	Jayne Forbes	334	15.8	−3.7
Liberal Democrats	Audrey Stern	264	12.5	+3.0
Conservative	Benjamin Hall	216	10.2	−7.7
Conservative	Aeronwy Harris**	203	9.6	−7.1
Turnout		2,124	46.5	−3.5
Labour hold				
Labour hold				

Harris was a sitting councillor for the Muswell Hill ward.

=== South Tottenham ===
South Tottenham (2)
Party	Candidate	Votes	%	±%
Labour	Ian Willmore*	1,197	72.3	+22.6
Labour	Liz Singleton	1,191	71.9	+16.1
Conservative	Roger Kirkwood	404	24.4	−9.1
Conservative	Rosemary Richards	391	23.6	−9.1
Turnout		1,668	36.8	−5.2
Labour hold				
Labour hold				

=== Tottenham Central ===
Tottenham Central (3)
Party	Candidate	Votes	%	±%
Labour	Bob Harris**	1,784	66.3	+2.3
Labour	Bernice Vanier	1,693	62.9	+10.5
Labour	Scott Reeve	1,570	58.3	+7.2
Liberal Democrats	Denzil Brider	384	14.3	−1.3
Conservative	Judith Flynn	359	13.3	−12.7
Conservative	Doris Morrison	342	12.7	−12.1
Conservative	Ross Kirkwood	335	12.4	−10.2
Liberal Democrats	Errington Simmons	297	11.0	N/A
Liberal Democrats	Michael Protopapa	293	10.9	N/A
Green	Martha Brett	264	9.8	−9.4
Turnout		2,697	37.6	−2.1
Labour hold				
Labour hold				
Labour hold				

Bob Harris was a sitting councillor for High Cross ward.

=== West Green ===
West Green (3)
Party	Candidate	Votes	%	±%
Labour	Peter Jones	1,804	60.3	+11.6
Labour	Rahman Khan	1,678	56.1	+14.8
Labour	Erline Prescott*	1,649	55.1	+9.4
Conservative	Michael Flynn	719	24.0	−14.3
Conservative	Ada Gang-Devi	639	21.3	−14.2
Conservative	Joseph Smith	604	20.2	−14.1
Green	Lilias Cheyne	308	10.3	−4.7
Liberal Democrats	Joan Lewis	294	9.8	+1.4
Liberal Democrats	Ian Macpherson	243	8.1	N/A
Liberal Democrats	Edgar Rowe	211	7.0	N/A
Independent	George Silcott	128	4.3	N/A
Turnout		3,001	40.8	−3.2
Labour hold				
Labour hold				
Labour hold				

=== White Hart Lane ===
White Hart Lane (3)
Party	Candidate	Votes	%	±%
Labour	Jean Brown	1,412	52.5	+8.9
Labour	Alfred Airende*	1,285	47.8	+5.5
Labour	Jayanti Patel	1,146	42.6	+5.2
Conservative	Philip Murphie*	931	34.6	−5.5
Conservative	Sybil James	856	31.8	−6.0
Conservative	Roger Smethurst	794	29.5	−8.1
Green	Elizabeth Adams	255	9.5	−1.7
Liberal Democrats	Roberta Mehmed	186	6.9	−0.5
Liberal Democrats	Mustafa Mehmed	181	6.7	N/A
Liberal Democrats	Winnie Zambra	71	2.6	N/A
Turnout		2,704	41.3	−2.1
Labour hold				
Labour hold				
Labour gain from Conservative				

=== Woodside ===
Woodside (3)
Party	Candidate	Votes	%	±%
Labour	James Gardner*	1,699	62.3	+20.4
Labour	Rafaat Mughal	1,524	55.9	+16.3
Labour	Abul Nuruzzaman	1,441	52.8	+14.0
Conservative	Dorothy Cowan	778	28.5	−16.4
Conservative	Mavis Spencer	756	27.7	−12.2
Conservative	John Warren	751	27.5	−11.9
Green	Simon House	328	12.0	−1.0
Turnout		2,737	41.7	−8.3
Labour hold				
Labour gain from Conservative				
Labour gain from Conservative				

== By-elections ==
=== 1994-1998 ===
Archway by-election, 24 October 1996
Party	Candidate	Votes	%	±%
Labour	Judith M. Bax	698	48.6	+2.1
Conservative	Ronald A. Aitken	503	35.0	+5.7
Liberal Democrats	June A. Anderson	163	11.3	−6.9
Green	Gillian A. Nicholas	73	5.1	−8.8
Majority		195	13.6	
Turnout		1,437	28.4	
Labour hold		Swing		

The by-election was called following the resignation of Cllr Derek Wyatt.

South Tottenham by-election, 24 October 1996
Party	Candidate	Votes	%	±%
Labour	Michael T. Green	801	78.5	+6.2
Conservative	Roger S. Kirkwood	172	16.8	−7.6
Liberal Democrats	Mo Chadirchi	48	4.7	N/A
Majority		629	61.7	
Turnout		1,021	22.1	
Labour hold		Swing		

The by-election was called following the resignation of Cllr Ian Willmore.

Green Lanes by-election, 1 May 1997
Party	Candidate	Votes	%	±%
Labour	Brian A. Haley	2,039	68.2	+1.2
Conservative	Michael Flynn	602	20.1	+4.5
Green	Lilias R. H. Cheyne	348	11.6	+1.0
Majority		1,437	48.1	
Turnout		2,989	58.0	
Labour hold		Swing		

The by-election was called following the resignation of Cllr Kerry Postlewhite.

Hornsey Central by-election, 1 May 1997
Party	Candidate	Votes	%	±%
Labour	Robert I. Binney	1,988	56.4	−2.6
Conservative	David A. Allen	741	21.0	+0.5
Liberal Democrats	Mo Chadirchi	494	14.1	+2.5
Green	David H. Burns	299	8.5	−3.0
Majority		1,247	35.4	
Turnout		3,522	68.7	
Labour hold		Swing		

The by-election was called following the resignation of Cllr Claire Tikly.

South Hornsey by-election, 1 May 1997
Party	Candidate	Votes	%	±%
Labour	Neil Garrod	1,946	60.6	−4.6
Conservative	Ronald A. Aitken	434	13.5	+3.3
Green	Jayne E. Forbes	418	13.0	−2.8
Liberal Democrats	Sam Ghibaldan	415	12.9	+0.4
Majority		1,512	47.1	
Turnout		3,213	62.5	
Labour hold		Swing		

The by-election was called following the death of Cllr Philip Jones.
