= Peter Hulme-Cross =

British politician

Member of the London Assembly as an additional member
- In office 10 June 2004 – 1 May 2008
- Preceded by: Eric Ollerenshaw
- Succeeded by: Gareth Bacon

Personal details
- Party: UKIP (1994-2005); One London (2005-2008)
- Other political affiliations: Veritas (2005)

Peter Hulme-Cross is a British politician who was a Member of the London Assembly (AM) as an additional member from 2004 to 2008. He was also a member of the London Fire and Emergency Planning Authority.

== Career ==
He was one of the United Kingdom Independence Party's first two members of the London Assembly, having been elected to that body in the 2004 Assembly elections on the UKIP party list. On 31 January 2005 it was announced that he was defecting to the breakaway Veritas, along with fellow UKIP Assembly member Damian Hockney, although Hulme-Cross did not leave UKIP. Later that year, following a disappointing showing for Veritas in the 2005 General Election, Hockney and Hulme-Cross renamed their group on the London Assembly "Veritas-UKIP". However, UKIP complained that this had been done without their consent and refused to renew Hulme-Cross's membership.

Hulme-Cross and Hockney founded the One London Party on 1 September 2005 and renamed the London Assembly group One London.

In November 2005 he was rapporteur on the London Assembly Transport Committee report into the Public Carriage Office entitled "Where to, Guv?"

In October 2006 he was rapporteur on the London Assembly Environment Committee report into the provision of allotments in London entitled "A Lot to Lose - London's disappearing allotments". He subsequently launched an official GLA website detailing all allotment provision in London.

In March 2008 he was rapporteur on the London Assembly Transport Committee report into rogue minicabs entitled "Tackling taxi touting in London". He and Hockney failed to keep their seats in the May 2008 elections.

Hulme-Cross has been a longstanding member of the Sylvan Debating Club.
