= Joanne McCartney =

Deputy Mayor of London

Joanne McCartney AM
- McCartney in 2024

7th Deputy Mayor of London
- Incumbent
- Assumed office 9 May 2016
- Mayor: Sadiq Khan
- Preceded by: Roger Evans

Member of the London Assembly for Enfield and Haringey
- Incumbent
- Assumed office 10 June 2004
- Preceded by: Nicky Gavron
- Majority: 46,102 (28.1%)

Personal details
- Party: Labour Co-operative
- Children: 3
- Occupation: Barrister, politician

Joanne McCartney is a British barrister and Labour and Co-operative Party politician. Since 2004, she has served as a member of the London Assembly, representing Enfield & Haringey. Following the election of Sadiq Khan as Mayor of London in 2016, McCartney has served as Statutory Deputy Mayor of London.

== Legal career ==
Prior to her career in politics, Joanne McCartney worked as a barrister specialising in employment law. She also worked as an adjudicator for the Housing Ombudsman dealing with disputes between landlords and tenants.

== Political career ==
McCartney was elected councillor in the London Borough of Enfield in 1998, representing Edmonton and then Palmers Green.

She was elected to the London Assembly for Enfield and Haringey in the 2004 Assembly Elections and stood down as a councillor at the 2006 local elections. Subsequently, she has retained her seat at the 2008, 2012, 2016, 2021 and 2024 elections.

McCartney won re-election in 2008 by approximately 1,400 votes. In the 2012 election, she increased her margins to 36,741 votes. In the 2016 election, she broke records by winning by a margin of 51,152 votes.

She was a member of the Metropolitan Police Authority. She currently sits on the London Assembly's Environment Committee, Oversight Committee and Transport Committee.

Since the election of Sadiq Khan as Mayor of London in 2016, McCartney has served as Statutory Deputy Mayor of London. As Deputy Mayor, McCartney has led work on the Mayor of London's universal free school meals programme and on the Young Londoners fund and worked to create "Early Years Hubs" for disadvantaged children. As an Assembly Member, she has campaigned on rail devolution upgrades to the Piccadilly Line and child poverty.

== Personal life ==
McCartney has three children, and was chair of governors at her local primary school.
