= Neil Garratt =

British politician

Neil Garratt AM
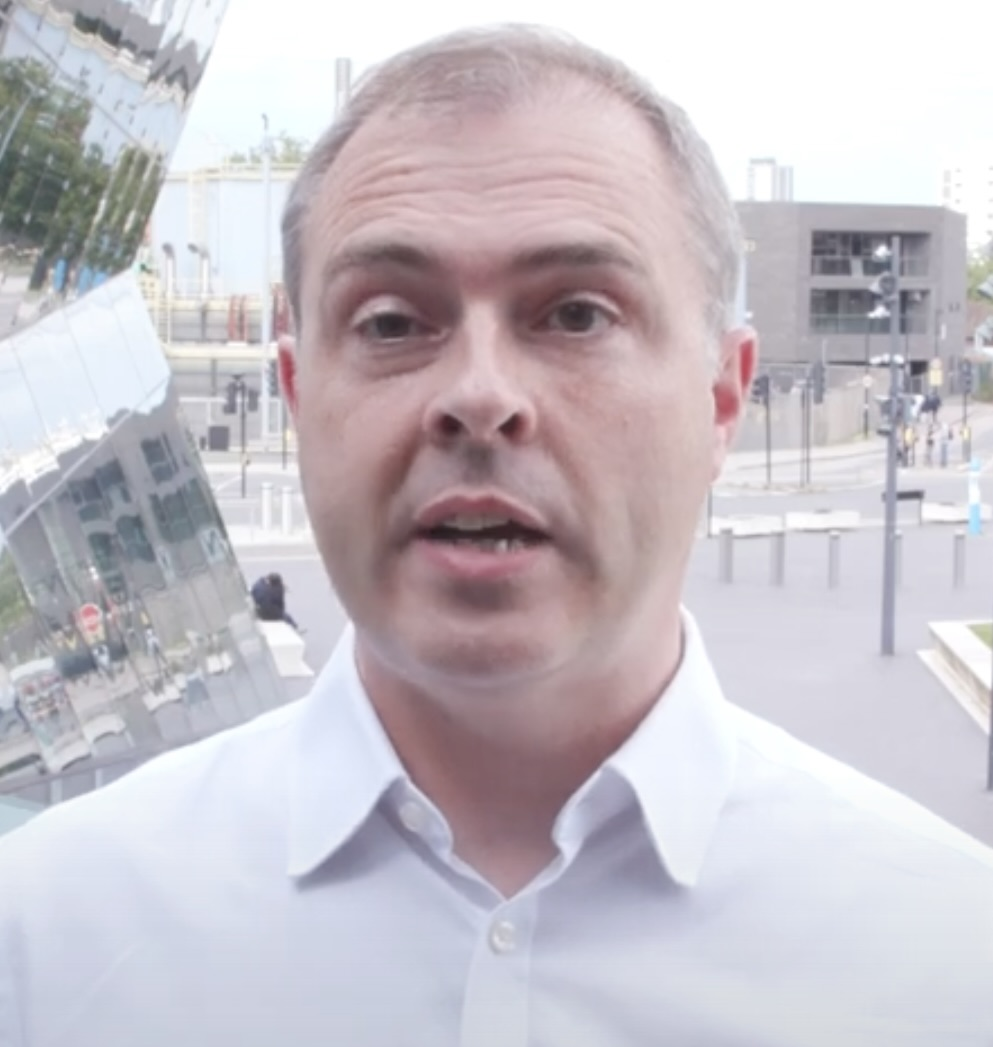
- Garratt in 2024

Leader of the Conservative Party in the London Assembly
- In office 2 May 2023 – 2 May 2025
- Deputy: Emma Best
- Preceded by: Susan Hall
- Succeeded by: Susan Hall

Member of the London Assembly for Croydon and Sutton
- Incumbent
- Assumed office 8 May 2021
- Preceded by: Steve O'Connell
- Majority: 10,294 (5.6%)

Councillor for Belmont on Sutton London Borough Council
- In office 25 October 2018 – 7 May 2026
- Preceded by: Patrick McManus
- Succeeded by: Chandra Alapati

Councillor for Beddington South on Sutton London Borough Council
- In office 23 May 2014 – 3 May 2018
- Preceded by: Malcolm Brown
- Succeeded by: Mo Saqib

Personal details
- Born: Neil Robert Garratt
- Party: Conservative

Neil Robert Garratt is a British politician, who has served as Member of the London Assembly (AM) for Croydon and Sutton since 2021. Between 2023 and 2025, he served as leader of the Conservative Party in the London Assembly.

== Political career ==
He was a member of Sutton London Borough Council, serving the Belmont ward. He was re-elected for Belmont in the 2022 local elections.

At the 2021 London Assembly election, Garratt was elected to represent the Croydon and Sutton constituency.

In May 2023, Garratt was elected as Leader of the London Assembly Conservative Group, succeeding Susan Hall.

He retained his Assembly seat at the 2024 election, though with a reduced vote share.

With effect from 2 May 2025, Garratt was replaced as leader of the Conservatives in the London Assembly by his predecessor Hall.

In the 2026 Sutton London Borough Council election, he lost his council seat to the Liberal Democrats.
