= Belmont (Sutton ward) =

Electoral ward in London, England

- Electoral ward for the Sutton London Borough Council
- Borough: London Borough of Sutton
- County: Greater London
- Population: 12,082 (2021)
- Major settlements: Belmont, Sutton
- Area: 2.475 km²

Current electoral ward
- Created: 1965
- Seats: 3 (since 2002); 2 (until 2002)

Belmont is an electoral ward in the London Borough of Sutton. The ward was first used in the 1964 elections and elects three councillors to Sutton London Borough Council.

== Geography ==
The ward is named after the suburb of Belmont, Sutton.

== Councillors ==
Election	Councillors		
2022	David Hicks (Conservative)	Neil Garratt (Conservative)	Jane Pascoe (Conservative)

== Elections ==
=== 2022 election ===
The election took place on 5 May 2002.

2022 Sutton London Borough Council election: Belmont
Party	Candidate	Votes	%	±%
Conservative	David Hicks	1,537	46.5	
Conservative	Neil Garratt	1,531	46.3	
Conservative	Jane Pascoe	1,414	42.8	
Liberal Democrats	Samantha Bourne	1,244	37.6	
Liberal Democrats	Dean Juster	1,182	35.7	
Liberal Democrats	Samuel Weatherlake	1,005	30.4	
Labour	Gale Blears	586	17.7	
Labour	Alan Aylward	535	16.2	
Labour	Marian Wingrove	474	14.3	
Green	Duncan Lambe	411	12.4	
Turnout				
Conservative hold				
Conservative hold				
Conservative hold				

=== 2018 by-election ===
The by-election took place on 25 October 2018, following the resignation of Patrick McManus.

2018 Belmont by-election
Party	Candidate	Votes	%	±%
Conservative	Neil Garratt	1,328	46.7	▼9.6
Liberal Democrats	Dean Juster	1,069	37.6	▲10.7
Labour	Marian Wingrove	303	10.7	▼6.1
Green	Claire Jackson-Prior	63	2.2	▲2.2
UKIP	John Bannon	50	1.8	▲1.8
CPA	Ashley Dickenson	30	1.1	▲1.1
Majority		259	9.1	
Turnout		2,843		
Conservative hold		Swing		

== See also ==
- List of electoral wards in Greater London
