= Len Duvall, Baron Duvall =

British politician (born 1961)

The Right Honourable The Lord Duvall OBE AM
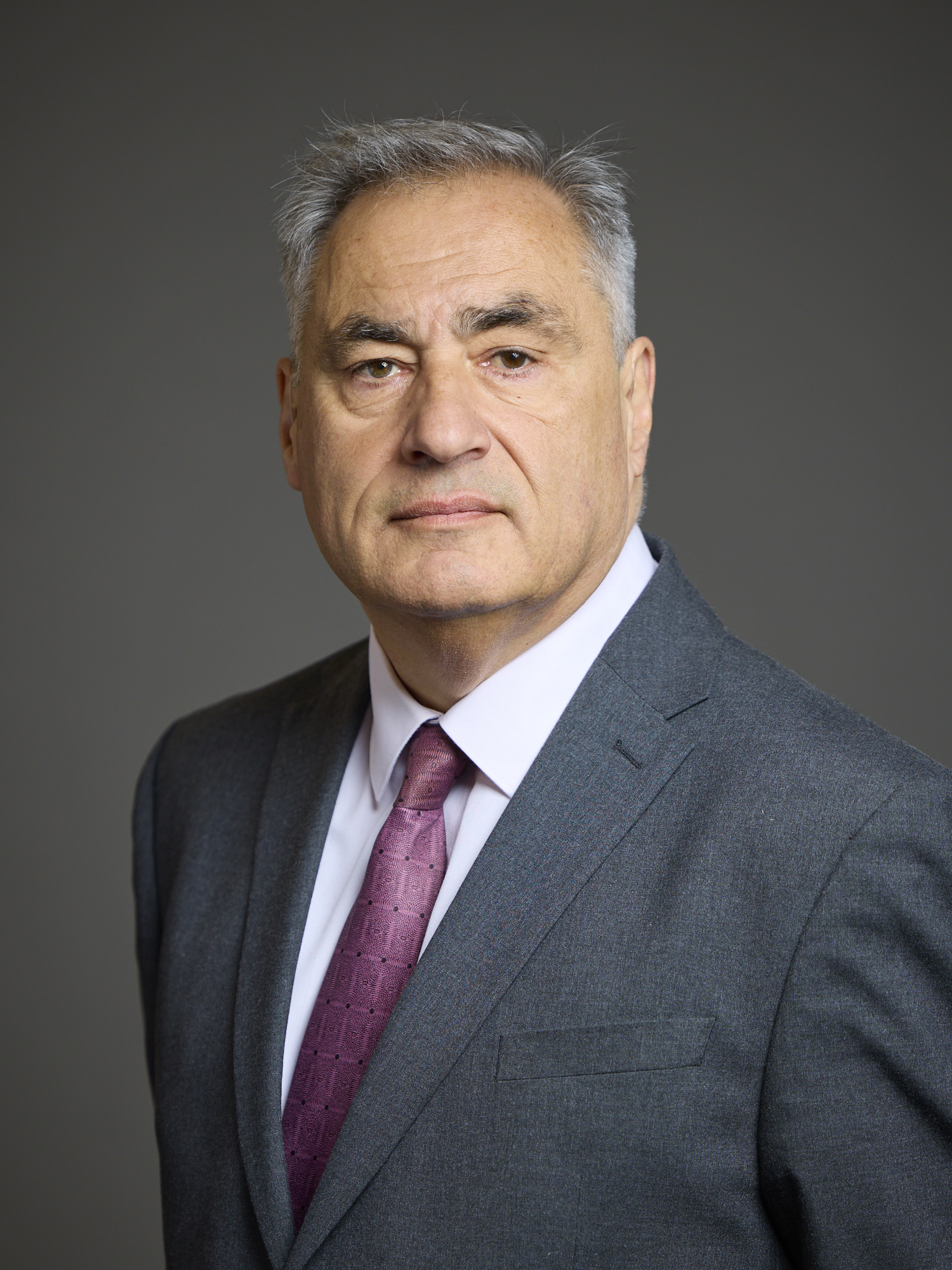
- Official portrait, 2026

Chair of the London Assembly
- In office 6 May 2025 – 11 May 2026
- Deputy: Andrew Boff
- Preceded by: Andrew Boff
- Succeeded by: Andrew Boff

Deputy Chair of the London Assembly
- Incumbent
- Assumed office 11 May 2026
- Preceded by: Andrew Boff
- In office 10 May 2024 – 6 May 2025
- Preceded by: Onkar Sahota
- Succeeded by: Andrew Boff

Leader of the Labour Group in the London Assembly
- Incumbent
- Assumed office 2004
- Leader: Tony Blair; Gordon Brown; Ed Miliband; Jeremy Corbyn; Keir Starmer; Andy Burnham
- Preceded by: Toby Harris

Chair of the London Labour Party
- In office 2002–2019
- Preceded by: Chris Robbins
- Succeeded by: Jim Kelly

Member of the London Assembly for Greenwich and Lewisham
- Incumbent
- Assumed office 4 May 2000
- Preceded by: Office Created
- Majority: 51,807 (32.1%)

Member of the House of Lords
- Lord Temporal
- Life peerage 8 January 2026

Personal details
- Born: 26 September 1961 (age 65) Woolwich, London, England
- Party: Labour Co-op
- Profession: Politician

Leonard Lloyd Duvall, Baron Duvall, OBE (born 26 September 1961) is a British Labour and Co-operative politician who has been chair of the London Assembly since May 2025, having previously served as deputy chair from 2024. Additionally, Duvall has been serving as the Leader of the Labour Group in the London Assembly since 2004, and has been the Member of the London Assembly (AM) for Greenwich and Lewisham since 2000. Duvall is a former chair of both the Metropolitan Police Authority and the London Labour Party Regional Board.

== Early life and career ==
Duvall was born and raised in Woolwich. He suffered from ill health as a child and attended a special school for ten years. After leaving school aged 16 he became a youth worker and later worked in local government.

== Early political career ==
Duvall was a councillor in the London Borough of Greenwich from 1990 until 2001, during which time he was deputy leader of the council, until 1992, when he became leader, a position he held until his election to the London Assembly. He was one of the founders of the New Local Government Network, chair of the Thames Gateway London Partnership, chair of the Improvement and Development Agency for Local Government, vice-chair of the Local Government Information Unit, a non–executive Director of Millennium Experience Ltd, deputy chair of the Association of London Government, a member of the Council of Europe and Chamber of the Regions, chair of the Commonwealth Local Government Forum (1998–2005), and in 1998 he was appointed an OBE for "services to Local Government in London and to the Thames Gateway Partnership".

== London Assembly ==
He was first elected as an AM in 2000, and retained his Greenwich and Lewisham seat in the 2004, 2008, 2012, 2016, 2021, 2024 elections. Duval is the only remaining London Assembly member to have served continuously since the London Assembly was established in May 2000. He is leader of the Labour Group on the London Assembly, chair of both the EU Exit Working Group and the GLA Oversight Committee, and Deputy Chair of the Budget and Performance Committee and the Budget and Monitoring Sub-Committee.

Outside the London Assembly, he was a non-executive director of Tilfen Land, a property development company and a board member of the Royal Artillery Museums Trust, his father and grandfather having served as gunners in the Royal Artillery. From 2015 to 2025 he was chair of the Royal Greenwich Heritage Trust. During his time as chair Charlton House was placed on the Historic England at risk register.

== Daniel Morgan Inquiry ==
In 2021 Duvall was praised by the Panel investigating the unsolved 1987 murder of Daniel Morgan for giving effective direction while chair of the Metropolitan Police authority.

== House of Lords ==
Duvall was nominated for a life peerage as part of the 2025 Political Peerages to sit in the House of Lords as a Labour peer; he was created as Baron Duvall, of Woolwich in the Royal Borough of Greenwich on 8 January 2026.

== Personal life ==
His partner is Jackie Smith, who is a councillor in the London Borough of Greenwich and became Deputy Leader in May 2026.

Party political offices
Preceded by Chris Robbins	Chair of the London Labour Party; 2002–2019	Succeeded by Jim Kelly
