= Dee Doocey =

British politician and businesswoman

The Right Honourable The Baroness Doocey OBE
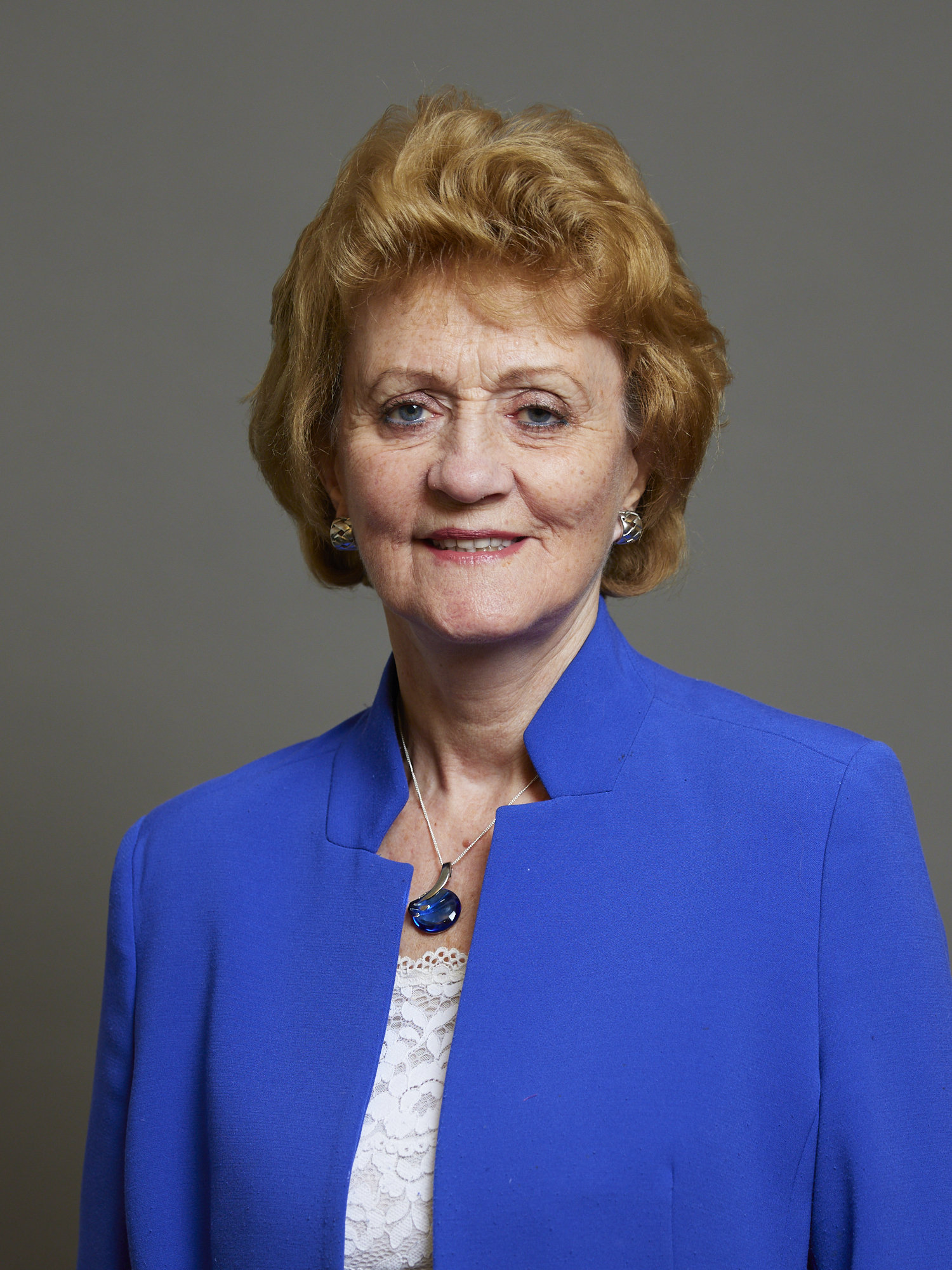
- Official portrait, 2022

Member of the House of Lords
- Lord Temporal
- Life peerage 21 December 2010

Member of the London Assembly as an additional member
- In office 10 June 2004 – 3 May 2012
- Preceded by: Trevor Phillips
- Succeeded by: Tom Copley

Personal details
- Born: Elizabeth Deirdre O'Keefe; 2 May 1948 (age 78) Drumcondra, County Dublin, Ireland
- Party: Liberal Democrats
- Spouse: Jim Doocey
- Children: 1

Elizabeth Deirdre Doocey, Baroness Doocey, OBE (née O'Keefe; born 2 May 1948) is a British Liberal Democrat politician and businesswoman. A former chair of the London Assembly, she was created a life peer in 2010 and is now the inaugural chair of the House of Lords Finance Committee.

== Early political and business career ==
Prior to her election to the London Assembly, she ran a management consulting business, DD Enterprises. During the late 1970s and early 1980s, Dee Doocey was the Director of Finance at Liberal Party headquarters. She served as a Liberal councillor in the London Borough of Richmond upon Thames from 1986 to 1994, and was chair of the council's Housing Committee. She served as election agent for Vince Cable in her home constituency of Twickenham from 1992 to 2015.

== London politics ==
Doocey was a member of the London Assembly from 2004 to 2012. She was originally elected as the fifth person on the Liberal Democrat party list, as a London-wide member of the Assembly. She was re-elected for a second term in 2008 but did not contest the 2012 election. She was chair of the London Assembly from 2010 to 2011, and Deputy Chair from 2011 to 2012. From 2004 to 2010 and again from 2011 to 2012, she was chair of the Assembly's Economic Development, Culture, Sport & Tourism Committee (renamed the Economy, Culture and Sport Committee in May 2011), which was the lead Committee monitoring preparations for the 2012 Summer Olympics and 2012 Summer Paralympics in London.

From 2005–12, Doocey was a member of the Metropolitan Police Authority, which oversaw the Metropolitan Police. She chaired the MPA's Finance & Resources Committee from 2011 to 2012, and also chaired the MPA's Olympic & Paralympic sub-committee. She represented the Mayor of London on the Home Office Olympic Security Board from 2008 to 2012.

== Peerage ==
Dee Doocey was created a life peer on 21 December 2010, as Baroness Doocey, of Hampton in the London Borough of Richmond upon Thames and sits on the Liberal Democrat benches in the House of Lords. In 2016, the House of Lords appointed her as the inaugural chair of its new Finance Committee. The Committee controls the House of Lords' internal budgets, commissioning the House's annual financial plan and monitoring expenditure. As Chair of the Committee, Baroness Doocey is a member of the House of Lords Commission, which provides high-level strategic and political direction for the House Administration. The Commission and the Finance Committee arose from recommendations of the Lords Leader's Group on Governance, of which Baroness Doocey was a member.

During the 2010–2015 Parliament, she was the Coalition Government's representative on the Criminal Justice Board. She was also a member of the Joint Committee on the Draft Modern Slavery Bill [1], which comprised members of both the House of Commons and House of Lords, and which took written and oral evidence and made recommendations in a report to both Houses. She was a member of the House of Lords Refreshment Committee 2012 to 2015. In 2012, she was a member of the Draft Enhanced Terrorism Prevention and Investigation Measures Bill (Joint Committee).

== Personal life ==
Born Elizabeth Deirdre O'Keefe in Drumcondra, Dublin, she married Jim Doocey and they have one son.

Orders of precedence in the United Kingdom
Preceded by The Baroness Shackleton of Belgravia	Ladies; Baroness Doocey	Followed by The Baroness Kramer
