= Nicky Gavron =

British politician (1941–2024)

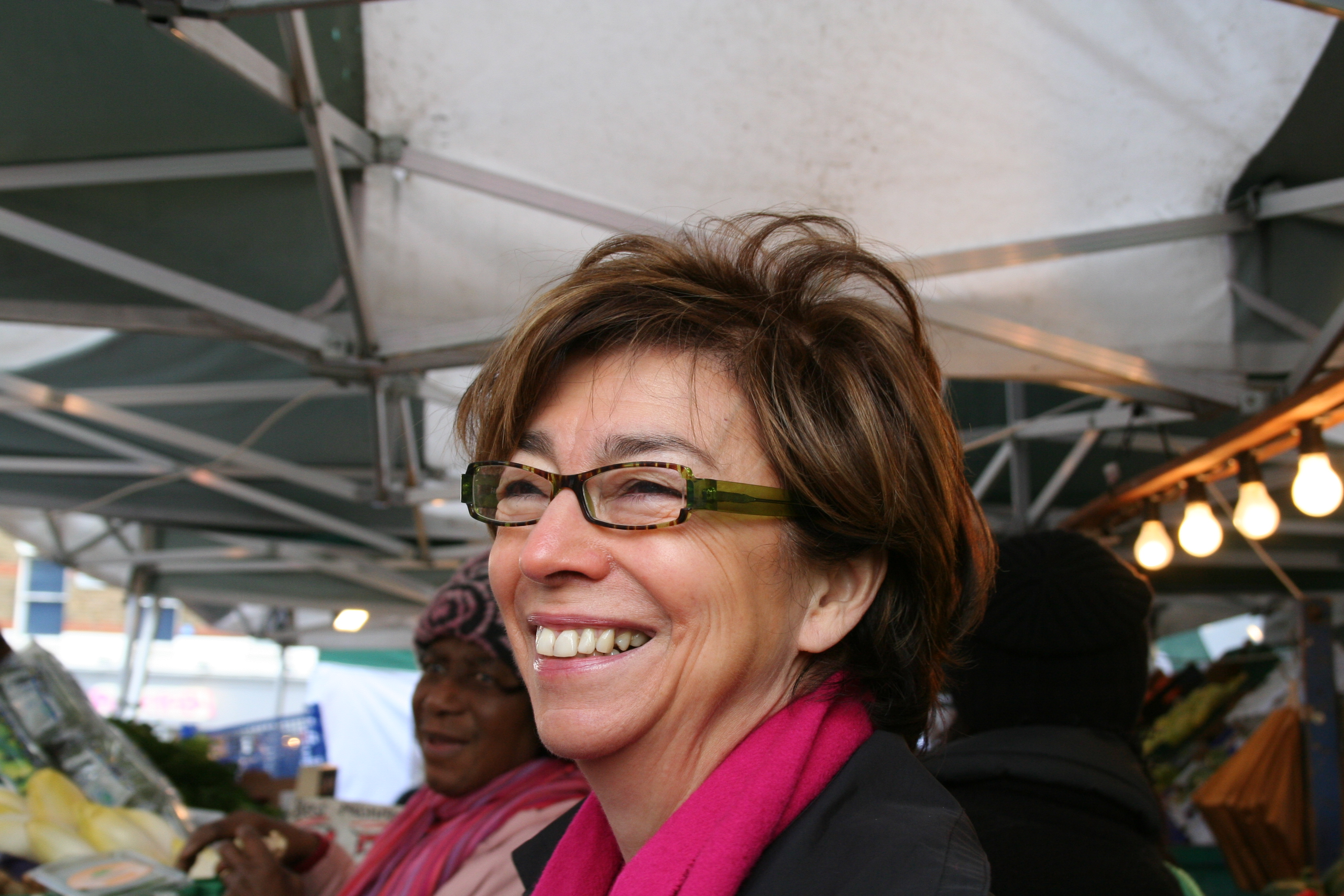
- Gavron in 2008

1st and 3rd Deputy Mayor of London
- In office 14 June 2004 – 4 May 2008
- Mayor: Ken Livingstone
- Preceded by: Jenny Jones
- Succeeded by: Richard Barnes
- In office 16 May 2000 – 16 May 2003
- Mayor: Ken Livingstone
- Preceded by: Office established
- Succeeded by: Jenny Jones

Member of the London Assembly
- In office 10 June 2004 – 8 May 2021
- Constituency: Additional member
- In office 4 May 2000 – 10 June 2004
- Preceded by: Constituency created
- Succeeded by: Joanne McCartney
- Constituency: Enfield and Haringey

Personal details
- Born: Felicia Nicolette Coates; 24 November 1941 Worcester, Worcestershire, England
- Died: 30 August 2024 (aged 82) London, England
- Party: Labour Co-operative
- Spouse: Bob Gavron (divorced)
- Children: 4
- Education: Courtauld Institute
- Occupation: Politician
- Profession: Lecturer

Felicia Nicolette Gavron (née Coates, 24 November 1941 – 30 August 2024) was a British politician who was deputy mayor of London under Ken Livingstone from 2000 to 2003 and 2004 to 2008. She was a member of the London Assembly from 2000 to 2021 and was the former Labour candidate for the 2004 London mayoral election.

== Early life and education ==
Gavron was born in Worcester on 24 November 1941, the daughter of a German Jew who had fled from Nazi Germany in 1936. In March 2008, she claimed that her mother had been chosen to dance before Hitler in the opening ceremony of the 1936 Summer Olympics in Berlin, until the authorities discovered that she was Jewish.

She studied at Worcester Girls' Grammar School, then went on to study art history at the Courtauld Institute in London. She then gained a job as a lecturer at the Camberwell School of Art in South London.

== Political career ==
Gavron became involved in politics in the 1970s when she campaigned against the widening of the Archway Road in London. In an interview with The Guardian she said, "It was in the days when everyone thought road widening was the answer, but the penny dropped for me that it was part of the problem."

In 1986, following the abolition of the Greater London Council, she was elected as a Labour councillor for Archway ward in the London Borough of Haringey. She was the leader of the London Planning Advisory Committee from 1994 until it was absorbed into the Greater London Authority. She was elected London Assembly member for Enfield and Haringey in the 2000 London Assembly election and was deputy mayor of London from May 2000 until June 2003, when the mayor, Ken Livingstone, appointed Jenny Jones of the Green Party to succeed her.

Although she was selected as Labour's mayoral candidate for the 2004 elections, she stepped aside when Livingstone was readmitted to the party. In the 2004 London Assembly election she was re-elected as a London-wide Labour Assembly member on the party list. Shortly after the election, Livingstone once again appointed her to the position of deputy mayor. She was supposed to take up a position as acting mayor during Livingstone's suspension for four weeks from 1 March 2006, but a High Court order froze the suspension, allowing him to remain in office.

Gavron stood for the Barnet and Camden London Assembly seat in the 2008 GLA elections against the Conservative incumbent, Brian Coleman. Although she was unsuccessful in this contest she increased the Labour share of the vote in the constituency and was also re-elected to the Assembly on the London-wide list vote.

Gavron ceased to be deputy mayor on 4 May 2008 following Boris Johnson's victory in the 2008 London mayoral election. She was subsequently the chair of the London Assembly's housing and planning committee and a deputy chair of the planning committee. She was also the London Assembly Labour Group's lead spokesperson on planning matters.

Gavron was a onetime member of the Safer London Committee and the Metropolitan Police Authority. She was a member of the Mayor's Advisory Cabinet, holding the portfolio for spatial development and strategic planning. In this capacity, she was the driving force behind much of the mayor's environment and planning policy, overseeing the London Plan.

In January 2019, Gavron announced her intention to stand down at the 2020 London Assembly election.

== Environmental policy ==
Gavron was internationally recognised for her environmental expertise. She was a key figure in the establishment of the London Climate Change Agency and the C40 – a worldwide climate change action group made up of the world's largest cities. In 2006, Business Week Magazine cited her, along with Ken Livingstone, as one of the 20 most important people in the world in the battle against greenhouse gas emissions. The magazine said, "[She aims] to turn London into a model of a sustainable future for all the world's great cities."

In the same year she called for a new Clean Air Act – a Low Carbon Act to fight climate change. She envisioned low carbon zones being rolled out across the country in the same way that smokeless zones had been in the 1950s.

Gavron criticised patio heaters, calling them "an indulgence too far". In an article for the Guardian's Comment is Free section she asked, "Why not wear a jumper and enjoy fresh air, not a cocktail of carbon dioxide, carbon monoxide and goodness knows what else."

== Personal life and death ==
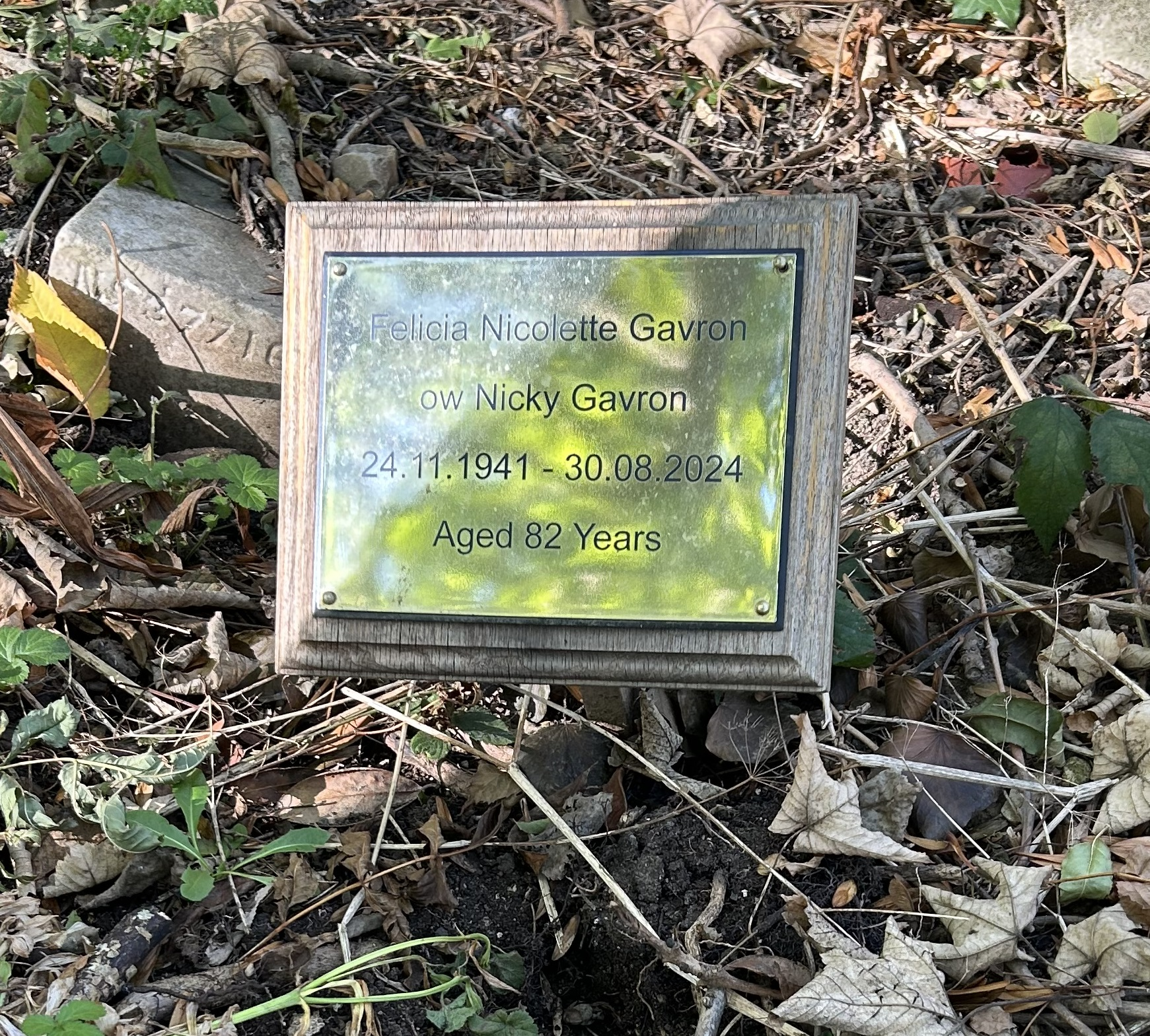
Grave of Nicky Gavron in Highgate Cemetery

In 1967, she married the publishing tycoon Robert Gavron (later Lord Gavron), a widower with two children. They had two daughters together, Jessica, now a lawyer, and Sarah, a film director. They divorced in 1987 and he died in 2015.

Gavron died at her home on 30 August 2024, at the age of 82. She was buried on the eastern side of Highgate Cemetery.

Political offices
New office	Deputy Mayor of London; 2000–2003	Succeeded by Jenny Jones
Preceded by Jenny Jones	Deputy Mayor of London; 2004–2008	Succeeded by Richard Barnes
