= 2000 London mayoral election =

Inaugural London mayoral election

- 4 May 2000
- Registered: 1,752,303
- Turnout: 34.43%
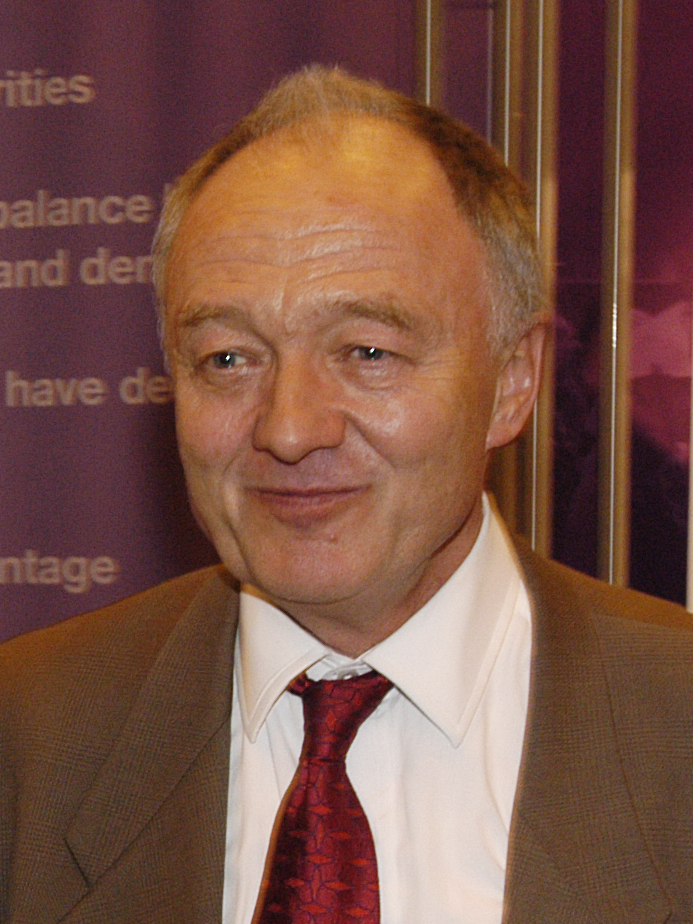

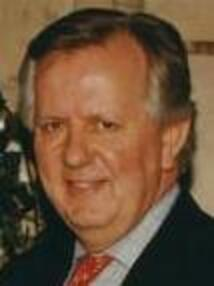

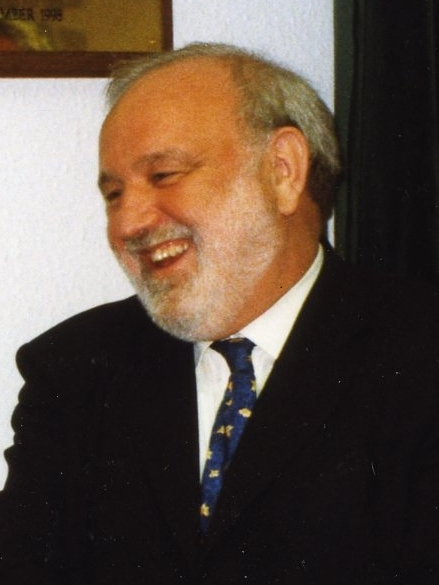

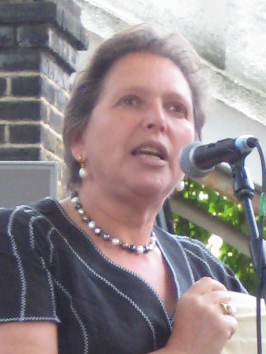
Candidate	Ken Livingstone	Steven Norris
Party	Independent	Conservative
First round vote	667,877	464,434
Percentage	39.0%	27.1%
Second round vote	776,427	564,137
Percentage	57.9%	42.1%
Candidate	Frank Dobson	Susan Kramer
Party	Labour	Liberal Democrats
First round vote	223,884	203,452
Percentage	13.1%	11.9%
Second round vote	Eliminated	Eliminated
Percentage	Eliminated	Eliminated
- First preference votes by London Assembly constituency. Blue constituencies are those with most first preference votes for Steven Norris and grey those for Ken Livingstone
Mayor before election
Position established
Elected mayor
Ken Livingstone
Independent

The 2000 London mayoral election was held on 4 May 2000 to elect the Mayor of London. It was the first election to the office established that year; the idea of a mayor of a Greater London Authority (GLA) had been included in Labour's 1997 election manifesto, and after their election, a referendum in London was scheduled for May 1998, in which there was a 72% "yes" vote with a 34% turnout.

Ken Livingstone was elected the first Mayor of London, running as an independent after losing the selection for the Labour Party. He beat Steven Norris of the Conservative Party by 57.9% to 42.1% of first and second-preference votes. The Labour Party candidate Frank Dobson was eliminated at the first round, with 13.1% of votes.

As Livingstone had previously been leader of the Greater London Council from 1981 to 1986 before it was abolished, he started his acceptance speech with "As I was saying before I was so rudely interrupted 14 years ago..."

== Electoral system ==
The election used a supplementary vote system, in which voters express a first and a second preference for candidates.

- If a candidate receives more than 50% of the first preference vote, that candidate wins.
- If no candidate receives more than 50% of first preference votes, the top two candidates proceed to a second round, and all other candidates are eliminated.
- The first preference votes for the remaining two candidates stand in the final count.
- Voters' ballots whose first and second preference candidates have both been eliminated are discarded.
- Voters whose first preference candidates have been eliminated and whose second preference candidate is one of the top two have their second preference votes added to that candidate's count.

This means that the winning candidate has the support of a majority of voters who expressed a preference among the top two.

== Candidates ==
- Geoffrey Ben-Nathan stood as a PRO-MaSS (Pro-motorist and Small Shop) candidate, campaigning on a platform of stopping the use of motorists as "wallets on wheels".
- Geoffrey Clements ran for the Natural Law Party, of which he was the leader. A doctor of physics from the University of Sussex, he also trained as a teacher in the techniques of Maharishi Mahesh Yogi.
- Frank Dobson (born 15 March 1940), the Labour Party candidate, was the MP for Holborn and St Pancras and Secretary of State for Health.
- Ram Gidoomal, a businessman and author originally from British East Africa, ran for the Christian Peoples Alliance.
- Damian Hockney was a leading member of the UK Independence Party (UKIP). He has since been a member of Veritas and the leader of One London.
- Darren Johnson (born 1966) was a leading member of the Green Party of England and Wales who was elected to the London Assembly in 2000.
- Susan Kramer (born 22 July 1950) was the candidate for the Liberal Democrats. She was later elected MP for Richmond Park and is now a life peer.
- Ken Livingstone (born 17 June 1945) had been leader of the Greater London Council and MP for Brent East, both for the Labour Party.
- Michael Newland was the candidate for the British National Party, at the time serving as the party's national treasurer. Previously associated with the National Front, he subsequently joined the Freedom Party.
- Steven Norris (born 24 May 1945) had served the Conservative Party as MP for Oxford East and Epping Forest.
- Ashwinkumar Tanna, who had been a candidate for UKIP in the 2000 Tottenham by-election, ran on an independent ticket with a range of policies including opposing privatisation of London Underground, local involvement in policing, and the establishment of a citywide business forum.

== Candidate selection ==
=== Labour ===
With the first mayoral election scheduled for May 2000, Ken Livingstone stated his intention to stand as a potential Labour candidate for the position in March 1998. Tony Blair did not want Livingstone as London Mayor, claiming the latter was one of those who "almost knocked [the party] over the edge of the cliff into extinction" during the 1980s. He and the Labour spin doctors organised a campaign against Livingstone to ensure that he was not selected, with Alastair Campbell and Sally Morgan unsuccessfully attempting to get Oona King to denounce Livingstone. They failed to convince Mo Mowlam to stand for the mayorship and instead encouraged the reluctant Frank Dobson to stand. Recognising that a 'one member, one vote' election within the London Labour Party would probably see Livingstone selected over Dobson, Blair ensured that a third of the votes would come from the rank-and-file members, a third from the trades unions, and a third from Labour MPs and MEPs, the latter two of which he could pressure into voting for his own preferred candidate, something that Dobson was deeply uncomfortable with.

Information on the Blairite campaign against Livingstone became public, costing Dobson much support; nevertheless, while Livingstone won amongst party members (60% to Dobson's 40%) and among affiliated unions (72% to Dobson's 28%, a more than 2:1 vote), Dobson's landslide victory (173:27 in ratio) amongst MPs, MEPS and GLA candidates saw him win narrowly overall: forming a simple electoral college outcome of 51.5% to 48.5%. Livingstone proclaimed Dobson to be "a tainted candidate" and stated his intention to run for the Mayoralty as an independent candidate. Aware that this would result in his expulsion from Labour, he publicly stated that "I have been forced to choose between the party I love and upholding the democratic rights of Londoners."

First round
Candidate	Elected members (33.3%)	Individual members (33.3%)	Affiliated supporters (33.3%)	Total
Frank Dobson	86.5%	35.3%	26.9%	49.6%
Ken Livingstone	12.2%	54.9%	71.0%	46.0%
Glenda Jackson	1.4%	9.8%	2.1%	4.4%

Second round
Candidate	Elected members (33.3%)	Individual members (33.3%)	Affiliated supporters (33.3%)	Total
Frank Dobson ✓	86.5%	40.1%	28.0%	51.5%
Ken Livingstone	13.5%	59.9%	72.0%	48.5%

=== Conservatives ===
Steven Norris had lost the original selection ballot for the Conservative candidate to Jeffrey Archer, but Archer stood down as a candidate when a newspaper printed a story accusing him of committing perjury during a 1987 libel trial (he was later convicted and imprisoned).

First round
Candidate	Votes	%
Jeffrey Archer ✓	15,716	71.2%
Steven Norris	6,350	28.8%

Re-run
Candidate	Votes	%
Steven Norris ✓	12,903	73.3%
Andrew Boff	4,712	26.7%

== Results ==
Mayor of London election 4 May 2000
Party	Candidate	1st round		2nd round			1st round votesTransfer votes, 2nd round
Party	Candidate	Total	Of round	Transfers	Total	Of round	1st round votesTransfer votes, 2nd round
Independent	Ken Livingstone	667,877	39.0%	108,550	776,427	57.9%	
Conservative	Steven Norris	464,434	27.1%	99,703	564,137	42.1%	
Labour	Frank Dobson	223,884	13.1%				
Liberal Democrats	Susan Kramer	203,452	11.9%				
CPA	Ram Gidoomal	42,060	2.4%				
Green	Darren Johnson	38,121	2.2%				
BNP	Michael Newland	33,569	2.0%				
UKIP	Damian Hockney	16,324	1.0%				
Pro-Motorist Small Shop	Geoffrey Ben-Nathan	9,956	0.6%				
Independent	Ashwin Tanna	9,015	0.5%				
Natural Law	Geoffrey Clements	5,470	0.3%				
Independent win							

- Turnout: 1,752,303 (34.43%)
- As the ballot papers are counted electronically, totals for all second preferences are available, even though some did not contribute to the final result.
