= One London =

- Leader: Damian Hockney
- Founded: 1 September 2005
- Dissolved: 17 November 2008
- Headquarters: 109-110 Bolsover Street; London; W1W 5NT
- Ideology: Euroscepticism
- Colours: Black and White with Red

One London was a small British political party formed on 15 September 2005 by Damian Hockney and Peter Hulme-Cross. They were elected to the London Assembly in June 2004 as United Kingdom Independence Party representatives, but in February 2005 announced the formation of the Veritas group at the Assembly. With the disintegration of Veritas after its poor showing in the 2005 general election, Hockney and Hulme-Cross formed One London, with Hockney as leader.

One London became a registered party in November 2005 and de-registered in November 2008.

== 2008 London Mayoral and Assembly election ==
In February 2008 the party announced that Hockney would be its candidate in the 2008 Mayoral election, promising to reverse the erstwhile mayor's anti-motorist policies and to halve the GLA portion of the council tax over the four-year mayoral term.

On 27 March 2008 Hockney pulled out of the race to become the mayor of London. He cited a lack of media opportunities for the candidates representing smaller parties as the reason but confirmed that the party would still contest the Assembly election.

The party received just 0.14% of the London-wide list vote, coming last in overall votes and losing both its Assembly seats.

== Ideology and policies ==
Although UK withdrawal from the European Union was a central policy objective, One London concentrated its efforts on the democratic deficit within London governance and the discrepancy between levels of taxation and public spending in London compared to the rest of the United Kingdom. It also called for the abolition of the London congestion charge and claimed to be the first party to have predicted that the cost of the 2012 London Olympics would exceed £10 billion.

== Controversy ==
The naming of the party as 'One London' caused some comment as the Mayor of London, Ken Livingstone, had just started a public campaign under that name as an attempt to build closer relations between ethnic communities following the 7 July 2005 London bombings.
