= Damian Hockney =

British politician

Leader of One London
- In office September 1, 2005 – November 17, 2008
- Preceded by: Party established
- Succeeded by: Party dissolved

Deputy leader of Veritas
- In office 30 January 2005 – 29 July 2005
- Leader: Robert Kilroy-Silk
- Preceded by: Party established
- Succeeded by: Howard Martin

Member of the London Assembly as an additional member
- In office 10 June 2004 – 1 May 2008
- Preceded by: Noel Lynch
- Succeeded by: Richard Barnbrook

Personal details
- Party: UKIP (1997–2005); Veritas (2005); One London (2005–2008)
- Other political affiliations: Referendum Party (1997); Conservative (before 1997)

Nicholas Richard Alexander Damian Hockney is a British former politician who was the leader of the One London party from 2005 to 2008. He was a member of the London Assembly (AM) as an additional members list, and was also a member of the Metropolitan Police Authority from 2004 to 2008.

== Political background ==
Previously a member of the Conservative Party, Hockney contested the constituency of Pendle for the Referendum Party at the 1997 general election, narrowly losing his deposit. He then moved to UKIP, for which he stood in Kensington and Chelsea at the 1999 by-election and the 2001 general election. He was the UKIP London Mayoral candidate in 2000, and in June 2004 he was elected as a London-wide Member of the London Assembly for UKIP.

On 30 January 2005, he announced that he was defecting to Veritas, the new party founded by ex-UKIP MEP Robert Kilroy-Silk. It was subsequently announced that he would serve as deputy leader of Veritas. On 29 July 2005, following the resignation of Kilroy-Silk, Hockney announced his resignation as deputy leader.

In September 2005, Hockney founded the One London Party with fellow London Assembly Member Peter Hulme-Cross.

In February 2008, the One London Party announced that Hockney would be its candidate in the 2008 Mayoral election. However, on 27 March 2008, Hockney announced that he was pulling out of the race to become the Mayor of London. He cited a lack of media opportunities for the candidates representing smaller parties as the reason, but confirmed that the party would still contest the Assembly election. One London won no seats, and he was not re-elected; the party was wound up later that year.

By profession, Hockney is a magazine publisher. He also once entered A Song for Europe, the UK preliminary round of the Eurovision Song Contest.

Hockney is distantly related to artist David Hockney.
