= List of female members of the London Assembly =

This is a list of women who are or have been members of the London Assembly.

== List of female members of the London Assembly ==
Party	Name	Constituency	Start	End	Reason	Ref
Labour	Jennette Arnold	Additional member	2000	2004	Changed constituency	
Labour	Jennette Arnold	North East	2004	2021	Retired	
Liberal Democrats	Louise Bloom	Additional member	2000	2002	Resigned	
Conservative	Angie Bray (Note: Also served as a Member of Parliament (MP).)	West Central	2000	2008	Retired	
Conservative	Pamela Chesters	Additional member	2000	2004	Retired	
Liberal Democrats	Lynne Featherstone (Note: Also served as a Member of the House of Lords.)	Additional member	2000	2005	Resigned	
Labour	Nicky Gavron	North East	2000	2004	Changed constituency	
Labour	Nicky Gavron	Additional member	2004	2021	Retired	
Liberal Democrats	Sally Hamwee	Additional member	2000	2008	Retired	
Labour	Samantha Heath	Additional member	2000	2004	Defeated	
Labour	Meg Hillier	North East	2000	2004	Retired	
Conservative	Elizabeth Howlett	Merton and Wandsworth	2000	2008	Retired	
Green	Jenny Jones	Additional member	2000	2016	Retired	
Labour	Val Shawcross	Lambeth and Southwark	2000	2016	Retired	
Labour	Diana Johnson	Additional member	2003	2004	Retired	
Liberal Democrats	Dee Doocey	Additional member	2004	2012	Retired	
Labour	Joanne McCartney	Enfield and Haringey	2004	present	Serving	
Conservative	Victoria Borwick	Additional member	2008	2015	Resigned	
Liberal Democrats	Caroline Pidgeon	Additional member	2008	2024	Retired	
Labour	Fiona Twycross	Additional member	2012	2020	Resigned	
Conservative	Kemi Badenoch	Additional member	2015	2017	Resigned	
Green	Siân Berry	Additional member	2016	2024	Resigned	
Labour	Leonie Cooper	Merton and Wandsworth	2016	present	Serving	
Labour	Florence Eshalomi	Lambeth and Southwark	2016	2021	Retired	
Green	Caroline Russell	Additional member	2016	present	Serving	
Conservative	Susan Hall	Additional member	2017	present	Serving	
Labour	Marina Ahmad	Lambeth and Southwark	2021	present	Serving	
Labour	Elly Baker	Additional member	2021	present	Serving	
Conservative	Emma Best	Additional member	2021	present	Serving	
Liberal Democrats	Hina Bokhari	Additional member	2021	present	Serving	
Labour	Sem Moema	North East	2021	present	Serving	
Labour	Sakina Sheikh	Additional member	2021	2024	Defeated	
Green	Zoë Garbett	Additional member	2024	2026	Resigned	

== See also ==
- All-women shortlist
- Parliament (Qualification of Women) Act 1918
- Widow's succession
