= Victor Anderson =

Victor Anderson may refer to:

- Victor C. Anderson (1882–1937), American painter
- Victor Anderson (Nebraska politician) (1902–1962), American politician, Governor of Nebraska
- Victor Henry Anderson (1917–2001), American priest and poet
- Victor Anderson (Georgia politician) (born 1967), American politician
- Victor Anderson (British politician), member of the London Assembly, 2000–2003
- Victor Anderson (Emmerdale), character in the British TV soap opera Emmerdale

== See also ==
- Victor Andersson (born 2004), Swedish footballer
