= AFC Wimbledon league record by opponent =

AFC Wimbledon's rapid rise through the English football league system between 2002–2019. It took the club just 14 years to progress from the 9th tier to the 3rd.

AFC Wimbledon is an English professional association football club, based in Wimbledon, Greater London. The club was formed on 30 May 2002 by a group of supporters of Wimbledon Football Club, led by Kris Stewart, Marc Jones and Trevor Williams who strongly opposed the decision of an independent commission appointed by the FA to allow the relocation of Wimbledon F.C. to Milton Keynes, who were subsequently reformed as Milton Keynes Dons in 2004.

AFC Wimbledon was accepted into the Premier Division of the Combined Counties League for the 2002–03 season. The club's average home attendance at league fixtures for their first season exceeded 3,000 – higher than the average attendance in the same season of Wimbledon F.C., who were still playing in the First Division (now the EFL Championship). AFC Wimbledon have also broken the record for the longest run of unbeaten league games at any level of senior football in the United Kingdom. The club remained unbeaten for 78 league matches between 26 February 2003 (a 3–1 away win at Chessington United) and 27 November 2004 (a 2–1 away win at Bashley).

The club went on to achieve 5 promotions in 9 years, ensuring that they were the first club to be formed in the 21st century to make it into the Football League and making them the youngest of the 72 Football League clubs by some distance. On 30 May 2016, AFC Wimbledon achieved their 6th promotion to Football League One after victory in the 2016 Football League Two play-off final, exactly 14 years to the day since the club's formation.

To date, AFC Wimbledon has played more than 800 league fixtures against 168 opponents, maintaining an unbeaten winning record against 42 of them. AFC Wimbledon have faced Oxford United more than any other team in league fixtures, with 22 matches between the sides to date.

== Key ==
- The records include the results of all non-league matches played in the Combined Counties League (2002–2004), the Isthmian League (2004–2008) and the Football Conference (2008–2011), as well as all professional league matches played in Football League Two (2011–2016) and Football League One (2016–present).
- All teams are listed under the names by which they originally played AFC Wimbledon in a league match; if they have subsequently changed their name then this is indicated with pink highlighting and explained in the notes section.
- † Teams with this background and symbol in the "Club" column are competing in 2021–22 EFL League One alongside AFC Wimbledon.
- ‡ Teams with this background and symbol in the "Club" column are either now defunct or have had a subsequent change of name since they last played a league match against AFC Wimbledon. Details are in the notes section.
- Teams with this background in the "Win %" column indicates that AFC Wimbledon have maintained an unbeaten record against that opponent.
- Teams with this background in the "Win %" column indicates that AFC Wimbledon have never won a league fixture against that opponent.
- ∅ Teams with this background and symbol in the "Notes" column indicates that a league game was cancelled as a result of the COVID-19 pandemic in the United Kingdom, which brought the 2019–20 EFL League One season to a premature end. The season was decided on a points per game average.
- P = matches played; W = matches won; D = matches drawn; L = matches lost; GF = Goals scored; GA = Goals conceded; Win% = percentage of total league matches won

== All-time league record ==
Statistics correct as of matches played through 18 September 2021.

AFC Wimbledon League Record By Opponent
Club	P	W	D	L	P	W	D	L	P	W	D	L	GF	GA	GD	Win %	First Match	Latest Match	Notes	Ref(s)
Club	Home				Away				Total							Win %	First Match	Latest Match	Notes	Ref(s)
Accrington Stanley †	8	1	4	3	8	2	0	6	16	3	4	9	20	28	–8	18.75	10 December 2011	10 April 2021		
Aldershot Town	2	0	1	1	2	1	1	0	4	1	2	1	4	4	0	25.00	10 September 2011	16 March 2013		
Altrincham	2	1	1	0	2	2	0	0	4	3	1	0	8	2	+6	75.00	22 August 2009	26 February 2011		
Ash United	2	2	0	0	2	2	0	0	4	4	0	0	14	9	+5	100.00	26 August 2002	7 February 2004		
Ashford Town (Kent) ‡	1	1	0	0	1	1	0	0	2	2	0	0	9	2	+7	100.00	14 August 2004	11 December 2004	^{[A]}	
Ashford Town (Middlesex)	2	2	0	0	2	2	0	0	4	4	0	0	10	4	+6	100.00	26 September 2006	12 April 2008		
Banstead Athletic	1	1	0	0	1	1	0	0	2	2	0	0	5	1	+4	100.00	24 August 2004	25 March 2005		
Barnet	3	1	1	1	3	1	1	1	6	2	2	2	6	8	–2	33.33	5 November 2011	20 February 2016		
Barnsley	1	0	0	1	1	0	1	0	2	0	1	1	1	4	–3	0.00	18 August 2018	19 January 2019		
Barrow	2	1	0	1	2	0	1	1	4	1	1	2	4	6	–2	25.00	14 November 2009	2 April 2011		
Bashley	1	0	1	0	1	1	0	0	2	1	1	0	2	1	+1	50.00	27 November 2004	29 January 2005		
Basingstoke Town	1	1	0	0	1	1	0	0	2	2	0	0	2	0	+2	100.00	23 August 2008	10 April 2009		
Bath City	2	2	0	0	2	0	2	0	4	2	2	0	11	6	+5	50.00	30 August 2008	25 January 2011		
Bedfont ‡	2	2	0	0	2	2	0	0	4	4	0	0	21	3	+18	100.00	2 October 2002	21 February 2004	^{[B]}	
Billericay Town	3	2	1	0	3	0	1	2	6	2	2	2	9	11	–2	33.33	8 October 2005	5 April 2008		
Bishop's Stortford	1	1	0	0	1	1	0	0	2	2	0	0	5	1	+4	100.00	18 October 2008	27 January 2009		
Blackburn Rovers	1	0	0	1	1	1	0	0	2	1	0	1	1	3	–2	50.00	16 September 2017	27 February 2018		
Blackpool	4	2	2	0	4	0	1	3	8	2	3	3	4	6	–2	25.00	2 September 2017	6 March 2021		
Bognor Regis Town	1	1	0	0	1	1	0	0	2	2	0	0	8	2	+6	100.00	16 August 2008	3 January 2009		
Bolton Wanderers †	4	0	3	1	1	0	1	0	5	0	4	1	7	8	–1	0.00	13 August 2016	14 August 2021		
Boreham Wood	2	0	1	1	2	0	1	1	4	0	2	2	1	3	–2	0.00	26 August 2006	29 January 2008		
Bradford City	5	3	0	2	5	2	1	2	10	5	1	4	16	16	0	50.00	24 September 2011	4 May 2019		
Braintree Town	2	1	1	0	2	1	1	0	4	2	2	0	7	2	+5	50.00	7 February 2006	24 January 2009		
Bristol Rovers	9	2	3	4	9	2	1	6	18	4	4	10	16	27	–11	22.22	6 August 2011	13 March 2021		
Bromley	4	3	1	0	4	1	2	1	8	4	3	1	14	10	+4	50.00	13 November 2004	13 April 2009		
Burgess Hill Town	1	1	0	0	1	1	0	0	2	2	0	0	5	1	+4	100.00	15 February 2005	30 April 2005		
Burton Albion †	7	3	2	2	7	0	3	4	14	3	5	6	19	22	–3	21.42	26 November 2011	9 March 2021		
Bury ‡	4	2	1	1	4	1	1	2	8	3	2	3	14	12	+2	37.50	23 November 2013	5 May 2018	^{[C]}	
Cambridge United †	4	1	1	2	4	2	2	0	8	3	3	2	13	8	+5	37.50	12 September 2009	2 January 2016		
Carlisle United	2	1	0	1	2	0	2	0	4	1	2	1	7	8	–1	25.00	6 September 2014	23 February 2016		
Carshalton Athletic	2	2	0	0	2	2	0	0	4	4	0	0	8	1	+7	100.00	19 August 2006	24 March 2008		
Charlton Athletic †	4	1	2	1	4	1	0	3	8	2	2	4	10	14	–4	25.00	17 September 2016	20 March 2021		
Chelmsford City	4	1	0	3	4	1	0	3	8	2	0	6	11	12	–1	25.00	19 November 2005	31 January 2009		
Cheltenham Town †	4	2	1	1	4	0	2	2	8	2	3	3	12	11	+1	25.00	17 September 2011	2 May 2015		
Chessington United ‡	2	2	0	0	2	2	0	0	4	4	0	0	23	4	+19	100.00	7 December 2002	14 February 2004	^{[D]}	
Chessington & Hook United	2	2	0	0	2	2	0	0	4	4	0	0	16	4	+12	100.00	2 November 2002	24 April 2004		
Chester City ‡	0	0	0	0	1	0	0	1	1	0	0	1	1	3	–2	0.00	31 October 2009	31 October 2009	^{[E]}	
Chesterfield	3	2	1	0	3	0	1	2	6	2	2	2	4	6	–2	33.33	18 August 2012	21 January 2017		
Chipstead	2	0	1	1	2	2	0	0	4	2	1	1	7	4	+3	50.00	21 August 2002	3 March 2004		
Cobham	2	2	0	0	2	2	0	0	4	4	0	0	18	1	+17	100.00	26 October 2002	6 March 2004		
Corinthian Casuals	1	0	1	0	1	1	0	0	2	1	1	0	4	1	+3	50.00	29 September 2004	26 February 2005		
Cove	2	2	0	0	2	2	0	0	4	4	0	0	17	3	+14	100.00	24 August 2002	21 April 2004		
Coventry City	2	0	2	0	3	0	2	1	5	0	4	1	5	6	–1	0.00	28 September 2016	17 September 2019	∅	
Crawley Town	4	2	1	1	4	1	1	2	8	3	2	3	11	14	–3	37.50	22 September 2009	16 April 2016		
Cray Wanderers	1	1	0	0	1	0	0	1	2	1	0	1	3	2	+1	50.00	4 December 2004	23 April 2005		
Crewe Alexandra †	2	0	0	2	2	0	2	0	4	0	2	2	6	9	–3	0.00	15 October 2011	23 January 2021		
Croydon	1	0	1	0	1	1	0	0	2	2	0	0	6	0	+6	100.00	11 September 2004	12 February 2005		
Croydon Athletic ‡	1	0	1	0	1	1	0	0	2	1	1	0	5	3	+2	50.00	18 August 2004	18 December 2004	^{[F]}	
Dagenham & Redbridge	5	2	2	1	5	3	0	2	10	5	2	3	11	10	+1	50.00	13 August 2011	19 April 2016		
Darlington ‡	1	0	0	1	1	0	1	0	2	0	1	1	0	2	–2	0.00	30 October 2010	8 January 2011	^{[G]}	
Doncaster Rovers †	4	3	1	0	4	1	1	2	8	4	2	2	11	8	+3	50.00	26 August 2017	7 August 2021	∅	
Dorchester Town	1	1	0	0	1	0	1	0	2	1	1	0	3	1	+2	50.00	13 January 2009	14 March 2009		
Dorking	1	1	0	0	1	1	0	0	2	2	0	0	5	0	+5	100.00	27 December 2004	28 March 2005		
Dulwich Hamlet	1	1	0	0	1	1	0	0	2	2	0	0	3	0	+3	100.00	20 November 2004	22 January 2005		
Eastbourne Borough	2	2	0	0	2	1	0	1	4	3	0	1	8	3	+5	75.00	11 August 2009	28 December 2010		
Eastleigh	1	0	0	1	1	0	0	1	2	0	0	2	1	4	–3	0.00	2 December 2008	28 March 2009		
East Thurrock United	3	2	0	1	3	1	1	1	6	3	1	2	13	6	+7	50.00	3 September 2005	21 March 2008		
Ebbsfleet United	1	1	0	0	1	0	1	0	2	1	1	0	5	2	+3	50.00	19 September 2009	24 November 2009		
Exeter City	4	3	1	0	4	1	0	3	8	4	1	3	14	12	+2	50.00	6 November 2012	28 December 2015		
Farnham Town	2	1	1	0	2	2	0	0	4	3	1	0	9	1	+8	75.00	19 October 2002	24 January 2004		
Feltham ‡	2	1	0	1	2	1	0	1	4	2	0	2	5	2	+3	50.00	20 November 2002	31 January 2004	^{[H]}	
Fisher Athletic ‡	2	2	0	0	2	2	0	0	4	4	0	0	8	0	+8	100.00	22 October 2005	1 January 2009	^{[I]}	
Fleet Town	1	1	0	0	1	1	0	0	2	2	0	0	6	1	+5	100.00	2 November 2004	8 January 2005		
Fleetwood Town †	8	3	1	4	8	2	4	2	16	5	5	6	12	15	–3	31.25	20 October 2012	5 April 2021		
Folkestone Invicta	3	2	1	0	3	1	0	2	6	3	1	2	11	5	+6	50.00	20 August 2005	19 January 2008		
Forest Green Rovers	2	1	1	0	2	1	1	0	4	2	2	0	8	3	+5	50.00	10 October 2009	25 April 2011		
Frimley Green	2	2	0	0	2	2	0	0	4	4	0	0	13	1	+12	100.00	28 September 2002	23 March 2004		
Gateshead	2	2	0	0	2	1	0	1	4	3	0	1	5	1	+4	75.00	5 December 2009	28 January 2011		
Gillingham †	8	4	1	3	7	3	3	1	15	7	4	4	25	20	+5	46.67	1 October 2011	17 August 2021		
Godalming & Guildford ‡	2	2	0	0	2	2	0	0	4	4	0	0	13	3	+10	100.00	5 October 2002	13 March 2004	^{[J]}	
Grays Athletic	1	0	0	1	1	1	0	0	2	1	0	1	4	4	0	50.00	31 August 2009	13 April 2010		
Grimsby Town	1	1	0	0	1	0	0	1	2	1	0	1	3	3	0	50.00	5 March 2011	30 April 2011		
Hampton & Richmond Borough	3	0	1	2	3	0	1	2	6	0	2	4	3	11	–8	0.00	11 October 2005	18 April 2009		
Harlow Town	1	0	0	1	1	1	0	0	2	1	0	1	4	3	+1	50.00	27 October 2007	19 April 2008		
Harrow Borough	3	2	0	1	3	3	0	0	6	5	0	1	12	6	+6	83.33	21 March 2006	9 February 2008		
Hartlepool United	3	2	0	1	3	0	0	3	6	2	0	4	6	8	–2	33.33	22 October 2013	25 March 2016		
Hartley Wintney	2	2	0	0	2	1	0	1	4	3	0	1	11	3	+8	75.00	31 August 2002	28 February 2004		
Hastings United	2	2	0	0	2	1	1	0	4	3	1	0	11	3	+8	75.00	25 September 2004	1 March 2008		
Havant & Waterlooville	1	1	0	0	1	0	1	0	2	1	1	0	3	0	+3	50.00	21 October 2008	28 February 2009		
Hayes & Yeading United	3	3	0	0	3	0	1	2	6	3	1	2	11	4	+7	50.00	20 September 2008	1 March 2011		
Hendon	3	3	0	0	3	2	0	1	6	5	0	1	12	6	+6	83.33	10 December 2005	8 March 2008		
Hereford United ‡	1	0	1	0	1	0	0	1	2	0	1	1	2	3	–1	0.00	20 August 2011	3 March 2012	^{[K]}	
Heybridge Swifts	3	2	1	0	3	1	1	1	6	3	2	1	6	4	+2	50.00	1 October 2005	23 February 2008		
Histon	2	2	0	0	2	2	0	0	4	4	0	0	13	1	+12	100.00	26 September 2009	16 April 2011		
Horley Town	1	1	0	0	1	1	0	0	2	2	0	0	6	2	+4	100.00	16 December 2003	31 March 2004		
AFC Hornchurch	1	1	0	0	1	0	1	0	2	1	1	0	2	1	+1	50.00	10 November 2007	26 April 2008		
Horsham	2	0	1	1	2	1	1	0	4	1	2	1	5	5	0	25.00	2 December 2006	29 March 2008		
Hull City	1	0	0	1	1	0	0	1	2	0	0	2	0	4	–4	0.00	20 October 2020	27 February 2021		
Ipswich Town †	2	1	1	0	3	0	2	1	5	1	3	1	6	4	+2	20.00	20 August 2019	28 August 2021		
Kettering Town	2	1	0	1	2	2	0	0	4	3	0	1	8	6	+2	75.00	15 August 2009	21 November 2010		
Kidderminster Harriers	2	0	0	2	2	1	0	1	4	1	0	3	2	5	–3	25.00	3 October 2009	12 March 2011		
Leatherhead	1	0	1	0	1	0	1	0	2	0	2	0	3	3	0	0.00	14 September 2004	5 February 2005		
Leyton ‡	3	2	1	0	3	2	1	0	6	4	2	0	2	3	–1	66.67	3 December 2005	16 February 2008	^{[L]}	
Leyton Orient	1	1	0	0	1	0	1	0	2	1	1	0	2	1	+1	50.00	28 November 2015	23 April 2016		
Lincoln City †	2	0	1	1	1	0	1	0	3	0	2	1	2	3	–1	0.00	2 November 2019	9 May 2021	∅	
Luton Town	5	2	2	1	5	2	1	2	10	4	3	3	13	13	0	40.00	8 August 2009	23 April 2019		
Macclesfield Town	1	1	0	0	1	0	0	1	2	1	0	1	2	5	–3	50.00	27 August 2011	24 January 2012		
Maidenhead United	1	1	0	0	1	1	0	0	2	2	0	0	7	1	+6	100.00	13 September 2008	17 January 2009		
Maidstone United	1	1	0	0	1	1	0	0	2	2	0	0	4	1	+3	100.00	6 October 2007	5 January 2008		
Maldon Town ‡	1	1	0	0	1	1	0	0	2	2	0	0	5	0	+5	100.00	23 August 2005	5 November 2005	^{[M]}	
Mansfield Town	5	3	1	1	5	2	1	2	10	5	2	3	15	9	+6	50.00	16 January 2010	16 January 2016		
Margate	3	1	1	1	3	1	2	0	6	2	3	1	5	4	+1	33.33	11 February 2006	26 February 2008		
Merstham	2	2	0	0	2	2	0	0	4	4	0	0	12	2	+10	100.00	9 November 2002	17 April 2004		
Metropolitan Police	1	1	0	0	1	0	1	0	2	1	1	0	2	1	+1	50.00	23 October 2004	9 April 2005		
Millwall	1	0	1	0	1	0	1	0	2	0	2	0	2	2	0	0.00	22 November 2016	2 January 2017		
Milton Keynes Dons †	3	1	0	2	4	0	2	2	7	1	2	4	4	8	–4	14.29	10 December 2016	30 January 2021	∅	
Molesey	1	1	0	0	1	1	0	0	2	2	0	0	5	0	+5	100.00	7 December 2004	5 March 2005		
Morecambe †	5	2	1	2	6	2	2	2	11	4	3	4	16	20	–4	45.45	8 October 2011	11 September 2021		
Newport (Isle of Wight)	1	1	0	0	1	1	0	0	2	2	0	0	7	1	+6	100.00	26 January 2005	12 March 2005		
Newport County	5	3	2	0	5	2	2	1	10	5	4	1	22	15	+7	50.00	30 August 2010	7 May 2016		
North Greenford United	2	2	0	0	2	2	0	0	4	4	0	0	15	6	+9	100.00	21 September 2002	27 April 2004		
Northampton Town	8	1	3	4	8	1	4	3	16	2	7	7	12	23	–11	12.50	13 September 2011	27 March 2021		
Notts County	1	1	0	0	1	1	0	0	2	2	0	0	4	1	+3	100.00	19 September 2015	23 January 2016		
Oldham Athletic	2	0	2	0	2	0	2	0	4	0	4	0	2	2	0	0.00	12 November 2016	21 April 2018		
Oxford United †	12	5	1	6	11	1	2	8	23	6	3	14	19	37	–18	26.08	29 August 2009	4 September 2021		
Peterborough United	5	3	2	0	5	1	1	3	10	4	3	3	10	11	–1	40.00	22 October 2016	20 February 2021		
Plymouth Argyle †	9	1	4	4	8	4	1	3	17	5	5	7	20	23	–3	29.41	16 August 2011	18 September 2021		
Portsmouth †	7	3	0	4	7	1	1	5	14	4	1	9	13	19	–6	28.57	16 November 2013	1 May 2021		
Port Vale	3	2	1	0	3	1	0	2	6	3	1	2	11	10	+1	50.00	3 September 2011	1 April 2017		
Ramsgate	2	1	1	0	2	0	2	0	4	1	3	0	4	2	+2	25.00	22 August 2006	22 December 2007		
Raynes Park Vale	2	2	0	0	2	2	0	0	4	4	0	0	20	3	+17	100.00	21 April 2003	3 May 2004		
Reading Town	2	1	1	0	2	2	0	0	4	3	1	0	9	3	+6	75.00	14 September 2002	6 May 2004		
Redbridge	1	1	0	0	1	1	0	0	2	2	0	0	8	0	+8	100.00	20 September 2005	22 November 2005		
Rochdale	7	2	3	2	6	4	2	0	13	6	5	2	21	18	+3	46.15	15 September 2012	27 April 2021	∅	
Rotherham United †	4	1	0	3	4	0	1	3	8	1	1	6	7	12	–5	12.50	17 December 2011	15 February 2020		
Rushden & Diamonds ‡	2	1	0	1	2	1	0	1	4	2	0	2	2	2	0	50.00	29 September 2009	26 March 2011	^{[N]}	
Salisbury City ‡	1	1	0	0	1	1	0	0	2	2	0	0	6	0	+6	100.00	18 August 2009	1 December 2009	^{[O]}	
Sandhurst Town	2	2	0	0	2	2	0	0	4	4	0	0	10	5	+5	100.00	17 August 2002	10 January 2004		
Scunthorpe United	4	1	1	2	4	2	2	0	8	3	3	2	12	11	+1	37.50	24 August 2013	30 March 2019		
Sheffield United	1	0	0	1	1	0	0	1	2	0	0	2	2	7	–5	0.00	10 September 2016	4 February 2017		
Sheffield Wednesday †	0	0	0	0	0	0	0	0	0	0	0	0	0	0	0	0.00				
Shrewsbury Town †	7	1	3	3	6	0	3	3	13	1	6	6	10	15	–5	7.69	29 October 2011	2 March 2021	∅	
Slough Town	2	1	1	0	2	1	1	0	4	2	2	0	13	2	+11	50.00	27 August 2005	31 March 2007		
Southall	2	1	1	0	2	1	1	0	4	2	2	0	10	4	+6	50.00	3 September 2002	27 March 2004		
Southend United	8	2	2	4	8	5	0	3	16	7	2	7	16	21	–5	43.75	31 December 2011	1 January 2020		
Southport	1	1	0	0	1	1	0	0	2	2	0	0	6	0	+6	100.00	14 August 2010	22 January 2011		
St Albans City	1	1	0	0	1	0	1	0	2	1	1	0	4	1	+3	50.00	10 March 2009	25 April 2009		
Staines Town	3	0	3	0	3	2	1	0	6	2	4	1	12	6	+6	33.33	29 August 2005	29 December 2007		
Stevenage	3	0	0	3	3	0	2	1	6	0	2	4	4	10	–6	0.00	28 December 2009	30 April 2016		
Sunderland †	2	0	0	2	4	0	1	3	6	0	1	5	3	11	–8	0.00	25 August 2018	21 August 2021	∅	
Swindon Town	3	1	2	0	3	1	1	1	6	2	3	1	6	4	+2	33.33	19 November 2011	17 April 2021		
Tamworth	2	1	0	1	2	1	1	0	4	2	1	1	10	5	+5	50.00	5 September 2009	19 February 2011		
Team Bath ‡	1	1	0	0	1	1	0	0	2	2	0	0	4	1	+3	100.00	6 December 2008	4 April 2009	^{[P]}	
Thurrock	1	1	0	0	1	1	0	0	2	2	0	0	3	1	+2	100.00	12 August 2008	21 February 2009		
Tonbridge Angels	2	0	1	1	2	1	1	0	4	1	2	1	9	8	+1	25.00	18 November 2006	26 January 2008		
Tooting & Mitcham United	1	0	1	0	1	0	1	0	2	0	2	0	3	3	0	0.00	30 October 2004	16 April 2005		
Torquay United	3	1	0	2	3	1	1	1	6	2	1	3	6	10	–4	33.33	25 October 2011	11 January 2014		
Tranmere Rovers	1	0	1	0	2	0	1	1	3	0	2	1	3	4	–1	0.00	25 October 2014	21 December 2019	∅	
Viking Greenford ‡	1	1	0	0	1	1	0	0	2	2	0	0	9	0	+9	100.00	1 December 2002	19 April 2003	^{[Q]}	
AFC Wallingford ‡	2	1	1	0	2	1	0	1	4	2	1	1	6	7	–1	100.00	23 November 2002	8 May 2004	^{[R]}	
Walsall	2	1	0	2	3	2	0	1	6	3	0	3	8	9	–1	50.00	6 August 2016	12 February 2019		
Walton Casuals	2	2	0	0	2	2	0	0	4	4	0	0	16	2	+14	100.00	21 December 2002	12 April 2004		
Walton & Hersham	3	3	0	0	3	1	1	1	6	4	1	1	11	8	+3	66.67	28 August 2004	30 December 2006		
Wealdstone	2	1	1	0	2	2	0	0	4	3	1	0	14	4	+10	75.00	4 October 2005	19 February 2008		
Welling United	1	0	0	1	1	0	1	0	2	0	1	1	2	3	–1	0.00	15 November 2008	21 March 2009		
Westfield (Surrey)	2	2	0	0	2	2	0	0	4	4	0	0	15	0	+15	100.00	8 February 2003	3 April 2004		
Weston-super-Mare	1	0	1	0	1	0	1	0	2	0	2	0	2	2	0	0.00	6 September 2008	7 March 2009		
Whyteleafe	1	0	0	1	1	1	0	0	2	1	0	1	2	2	0	50.00	30 August 2004	1 January 2005		
Wigan Athletic †	2	0	1	1	2	1	1	0	4	1	2	1	5	8	–3	25.00	16 December 2017	16 March 2021		
Windsor & Eton ‡	1	0	1	0	1	1	0	0	2	1	1	0	5	1	+4	50.00	29 October 2005	18 February 2006	^{[S]}	
Withdean 2000 ‡	2	1	0	1	2	1	0	1	4	2	0	2	10	6	+4	50.00	7 September 2002	10 April 2004	^{[T]}	
Worcester City	1	1	0	0	1	0	0	1	2	1	0	1	4	3	+1	50.00	4 October 2008	24 February 2009		
Worthing	1	0	1	1	2	1	1	0	4	1	2	1	5	4	+1	25.00	17 September 2005	17 March 2007		
Wrexham	1	0	1	1	2	1	0	1	4	1	1	2	4	4	0	25.00	23 January 2010	22 February 2011		
Wycombe Wanderers †	6	2	4	0	5	4	0	1	11	6	4	1	14	8	+6	54.55	22 September 2012	31 August 2019	∅	
Yeovil Town	1	0	0	1	1	0	1	0	2	0	1	1	3	4	–1	0.00	12 September 2015	30 January 2016		
York City	6	4	0	2	6	4	0	2	12	8	0	4	20	18	+2	66.67	21 November 2009	19 March 2016		

== Overall record ==
Statistics correct as of matches played on 3 May 2025.

AFC Wimbledon overall league record by division
Competition	P	W	D	L	P	W	D	L	P	W	D	L	GF	GA	GD	Win%
Competition	Home				Away				Total							Win%
Football League One (2016–2022)	133	35	47	49	133	29	40	64	266	64	87	115	285	374	−89	24.06
Football League Two (2011–2016) (2022−present)	184	74	49	61	184	52	55	77	368	126	104	138	451	467	−16	34.24
Conference National (2009–2011)	45	25	8	12	45	20	11	14	90	45	19	26	144	94	+50	50.00
Conference South (2008–2009)	21	17	2	2	21	9	8	4	42	26	10	6	86	36	+50	61.90
Isthmian League Premier Division (2005–2008)	63	32	18	13	63	33	17	13	126	65	35	26	224	120	+104	51.58
Isthmian League Division One (2004–2005)	21	15	5	1	21	14	5	2	42	29	10	3	91	33	+58	69.04
Combined Counties League Premier Division (2002–2004)	46	38	5	3	46	40	2	4	92	78	7	7	305	77	+228	84.78
Total	421	205	102	114	421	177	110	134	842	382	212	248	1,369	980	+389	45.37

== Notes ==
A. Ashford Town went to administration at the end of 2010, having been suspended from competitive football on account of failure to pay loan fees of more than £2,000 to Ebbsfleet United. The club were believed to have debts over £500,000 when faced with a winding-up order by HM Revenue and Customs. When the club eventually folded, former Ashford Town Director Tony Betteridge subsequently reformed the club as Ashford United in 2011, which became a founding member of the Kent Invicta Football League.
B. Bedfont folded in May 2010 after informing the Combined Counties League that they would be unable to participate the following season on account of financial difficulties. In May 2012 the club merged with Feltham in order to form Bedfont & Feltham, which joined the Combined Counties League Division One for the 2013/14 season.
C. Bury were expelled from Football League One on 27 August 2019, having spent 125 years in the Football League. The club was forced into liquidation for unpaid debts amounting to £5 million after a takeover agreement could not be reached.
D. Chessington United merged with Predators and Fetcham Park United in the summer of 2005, to form Mole Valley Predators. The club competed in the Combined Counties League during the 2005/06 season, but subsequently resigned and disbanded in the summer of 2006.
E. Chester City were expelled from the Conference National on 26 February 2010 for failing to pay off debts believed to be more than £200,000, having already received a 25-point deduction. As a result of this expulsion, Chester City were unable to fulfill their remaining fixtures of the season, meaning that the reverse fixture against AFC Wimbledon (scheduled for 17 April 2010) was never played. On 8 March 2010, it was announced that Chester City would have their league record (P28 W5 D7 L16 GF23 GA42 Pts–3) expunged. On 10 March 2010 the 126-year-old club was officially wound up at a High Court hearing in London.
F. Croydon Athletic were handed a £7,500 fine and a 10-point deduction after a case of financial irregularities was proven on 8 December 2011. A Football Association statement confirmed that the Isthmian League Premier Division club had been charged with 24 breaches of FA Rule E1(b) regarding the payment of players under written contract in relation to the 2009/10 season. All players and management resigned amidst the scandal, leaving the club unable to fulfill a league match against Ramsgate on 10 December 2011. The club was officially wound up on 18 December 2011 after a new buyer could not be found to pay off the club's £100,000 debt. A new club, dubbed AFC Croydon Athletic was subsequently reformed by fans, joining the Combined Counties League Division One for the 2012/13 season.
G. Darlington went into administration for the third time in their history on 3 January 2011, with owner Raj Singh stating ongoing financial losses as the reason for his deciding to end his involvement with the club. The club was handed an automatic 10-point deduction and informed that they could be relegated from the Conference National at the end of the 2011/12 season unless they were able to pay their creditors in full. On 18 January 2012, the club was only saved from immediate liquidation thanks to a last-minute injection of £50,000 worth of funding from supporter's group "Darlington FC 1883 Ltd." Administrators gave the fans group until 30 April to raise the £750,000 they need to buy the club. Darlington FC 1883 Ltd. purchased some of the assets of Darlington from Administrators on 3 May 2012. Despite the best efforts of supporters, however, the club failed to pay off its debts in the allocated time, and were subsequently relegated four divisions, to the Northern League Division One, on the recommendation of The Football Association. In line with its policy of not allowing clubs that go into administration to continue without paying debts, The Football Association decree that when a creditors voluntary agreement (CVA) is not agreed and a club has to be liquidated, then that club cannot continue to operate under its original name. The club was subsequently reformed by supporters as Darlington 1883 following the demise of the 129-year-old Darlington F.C. on 21 June 2012.
H. Feltham agreed to merge with Bedfont in May 2012 in order to form Bedfont & Feltham. However, as Feltham had already registered to compete in the FA Vase and Combined Counties League Division One for the 2012/13 season, it wasn't until the following season that the two clubs were able to amalgamate fully. Bedfont & Feltham competed in the Combined Counties League Division One for the 2013/14 season.
I. Fisher Athletic were officially wound up at a High Court hearing in London on 13 May 2009 after failing to pay off substantial debts. The winding-up order for unpaid income tax had officially been handed down on 13 March 2009, adjourned for 49 days until 22 April, and then adjourned for a further 21 days to 13 May 2009. It transpired that the club hadn't been paying players since November 2008. On 28 May 2009, a supporters trust was formed to help create a new club, dubbed Fisher which would compete in the Kent Football League Premier Division in the 2009/10 season.
J. Godalming & Guilford opted to revert to their original name of Godalming Town at the end of the 2004/05 season. The club registered to compete in the Combined Counties League Premier Division during the 2005/06 season.
K. Hereford United were expelled from the Conference National on 10 June 2014 due to financial irregularities. It was revealed a week later that the club's debts ran as high as £1,300,000. The club was accepted into the Southern League Premier Division for the 2014/15 season on 19 June 2014. On 10 December 2014, after failing to fully and properly comply with obligations to respond to questions coming from an Independent Regulatory Commission, the FA suspended Hereford United from all forms of football activity with immediate effect, until the order of the Independent Regulatory Commission was complied with to the full satisfaction of the Commission. The club was wound-up in the High Court in December 2014. Following the winding up of Hereford United on 19 December 2014, the Hereford United Supporters Trust (HUST) vowed to start a new phoenix club. On 22 December 2014, Hereford was unveiled.
L. Leyton were suspended from the Isthmian League Premier Division on 14 January 2011 due to non-payment of a £700 debt on league subscriptions. The Club Chairmen and Secretary then resigned, followed by the team management and players upon learning of the disastrous state of the club's finances. Unable to continue playing first team football, the club's remaining director, Louise Sophocleous, was forced to withdraw Leyton from the league and what remained of the club was disbanded.
M. In September 2009, Maldon Town were taken over by Tiptree United chairman Ed Garty in a move which saw both clubs form under a single umbrella of control. Maldon boss Stuart Nethercott was removed as manager and Tiptree manager Colin Wallington took his place. Both teams would play from Maldon's Park Drive ground while both teams completed their respective seasons. It was announced in April 2010 that Maldon Town would be rebranded as Maldon & Tiptree, with Tiptree United withdrawing from the Essex Senior League. In an effort preserve Tiptree United's name and history, the club were incorporated into Maldon Town, while a new blue and red striped kit was revealed ahead of the 2010–11 season.
N. Rushden & Diamonds were expelled from the Conference National on 11 June 2011. This decision was made due to their unstable financial position, meaning they could not guarantee being able to complete all their fixtures in the 2011–12 season. The club faced a winding up petition on behalf of HMRC in the week commencing 13 June 2011, with reported debts of £750,000. The club subsequently tried to register as a member of the Southern Football League but also failed to convince officials that they would be able to fulfill their fixtures list, ultimately entering administration on 7 July 2011. Fans announced their desire to create a new fan-owned club called AFC Rushden & Diamonds that would go on to compete in the United Counties Football League Division One for the 2012–13 season, having missed the FA deadline for registration for the 2011-12 season.
O. Salisbury City were demoted to the Conference South on 13 June 2014 after missing a deadline to clear outstanding debts, believed to be in the region of £150,000. On 18 September 2014, the club was placed into administration after an application through creditors was granted by the High Court. On 4 December 2014, however, a new company under the name of Salisbury FC Ltd was incorporated and created by a consortium of five (David Phillips, Ian Ridley, Jeremy Harwood, Graeme Mundy, and Steve Claridge). After buying the remaining assets of predecessor club Salisbury City from the administrators, they started the task of creating a football club from scratch. In May 2015, the FA placed Salisbury in the Wessex League Premier Division.
P. On 9 April 2009, Team Bath announced their withdrawal from the Conference South after the Football Conference notified the club that as they were not a limited company, but rather an affiliation to the University of Bath, that they would be henceforth ineligible for further promotions and would no longer be allowed to compete in the FA Cup. The club opted to resign from the Conference at the end of the season rather than restructure.
Q. Viking Greenford competed in the Combined Counties League Premier Division but folded at the end of the 2002-03 season after finishing bottom of the league with a lack of future financial backing.
R. AFC Wallingford had a change of name to Wallingford Town in 2013.
S. Windsor & Eton were officially wound-up by the High Court on 3 February 2011 due to an unpaid tax bill of £240,000. The fans had a strong desire to ensure that football would be continued to play in Windsor, however, and the following day a new company dubbed WFC Football Community Development Ltd was created with the aim of achieving that objective. A new club, Windsor, joined the Combined Counties League Premier Division for the 2011-12 season.
T. Despite finishing as Champions of the 2002-03 Combined Counties League Premier Division, Withdean 2000 were denied promotion to the Isthmian League as their playing facilities were deemed to be inadequate, and in the close season of 2003 their wealthy backer Alan Pook and many of the best players left for then Isthmian League team Worthing. The following season was a year of struggle with the club finishing 21st in the league. Being unable to finance their existence any longer, the club folded at the end of the 2003-04 season.
