= 2000 London Assembly election =

Inaugural elections to the London Assembly

- 4 May 2000

All 25 seats in the London Assembly 13 seats needed for majority
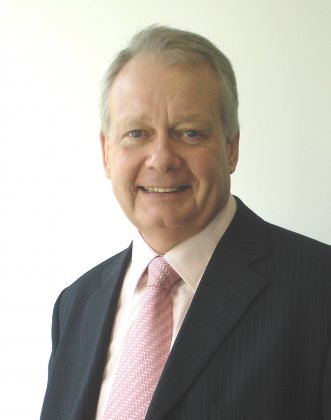

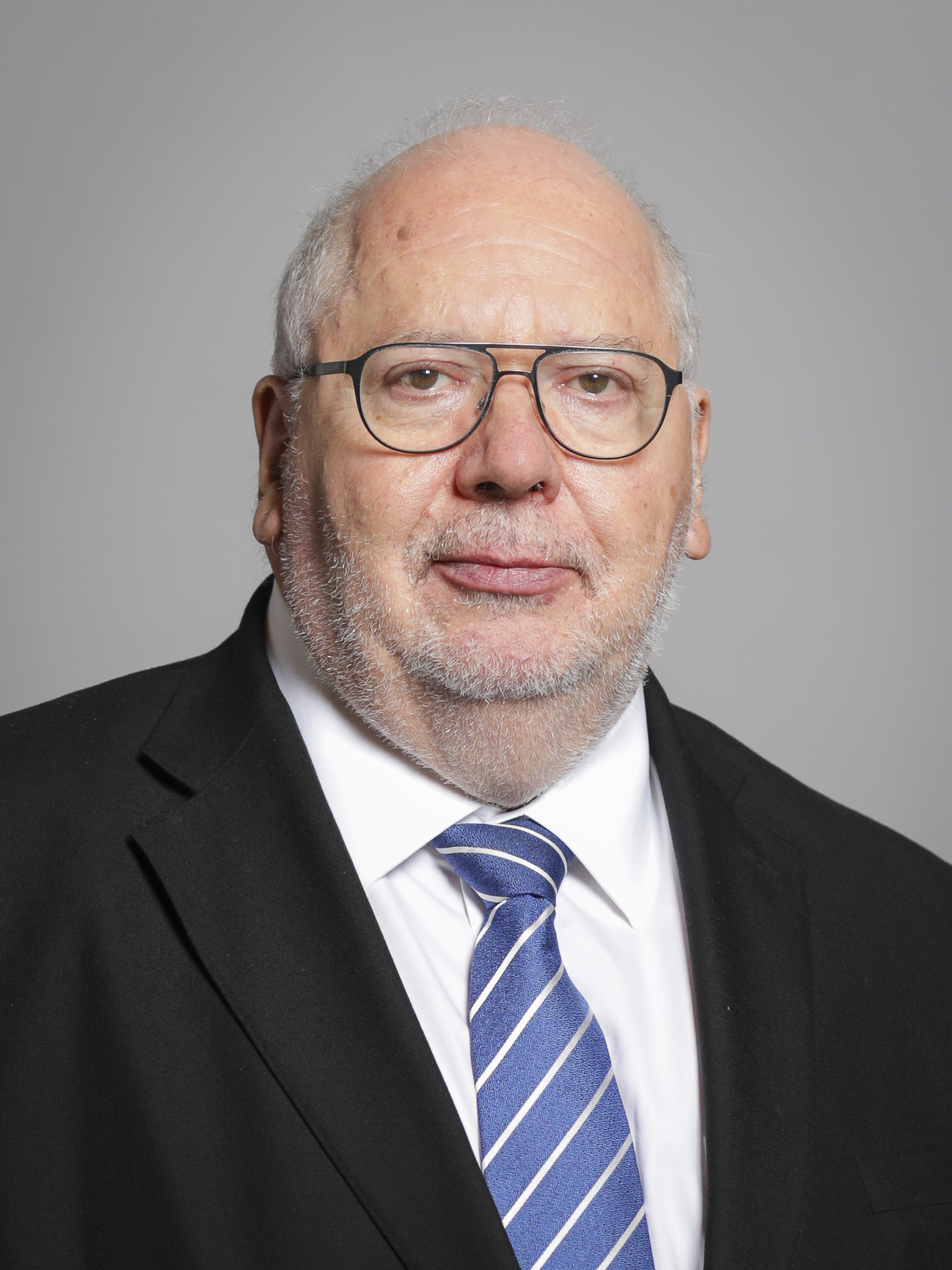

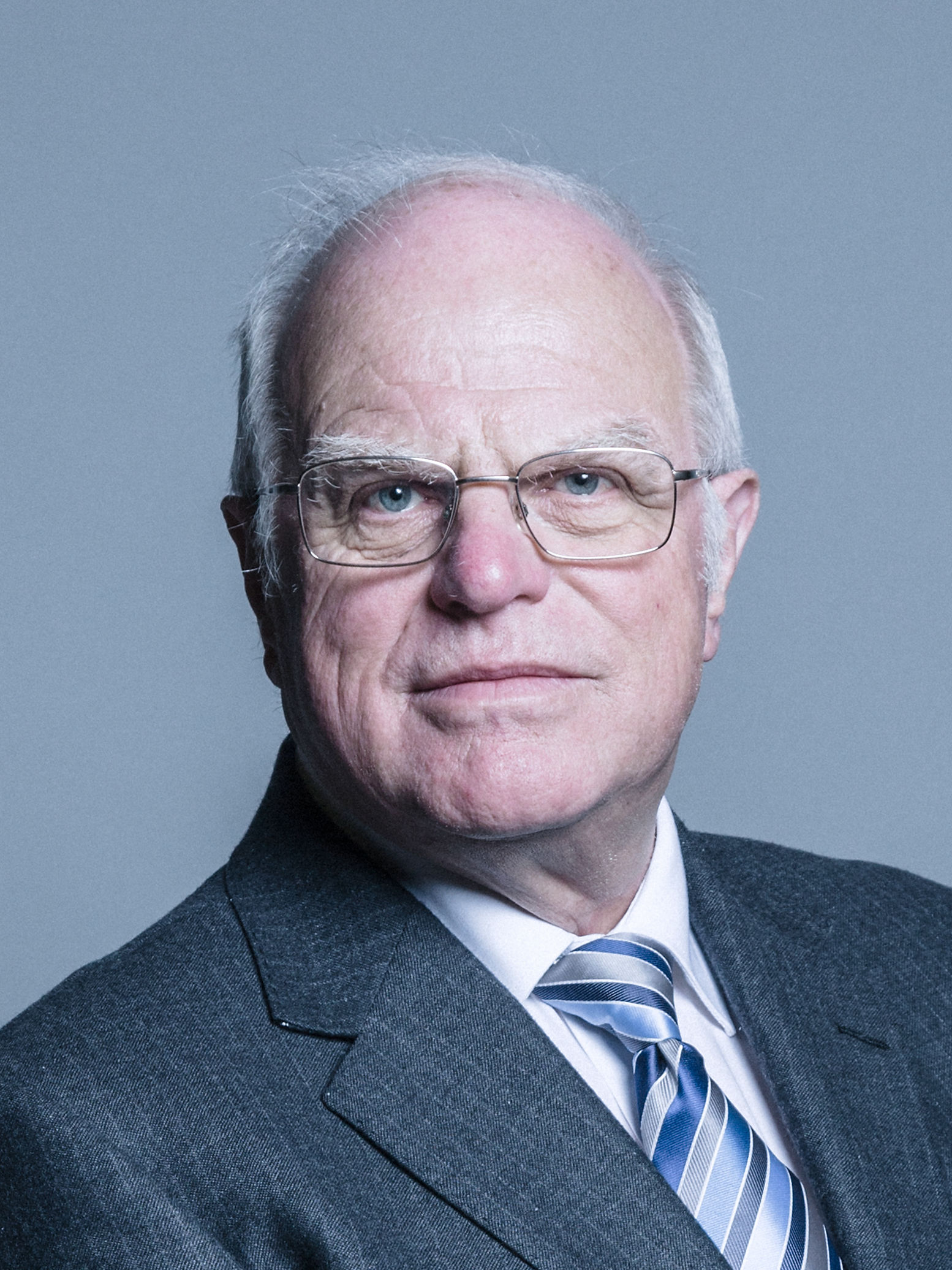

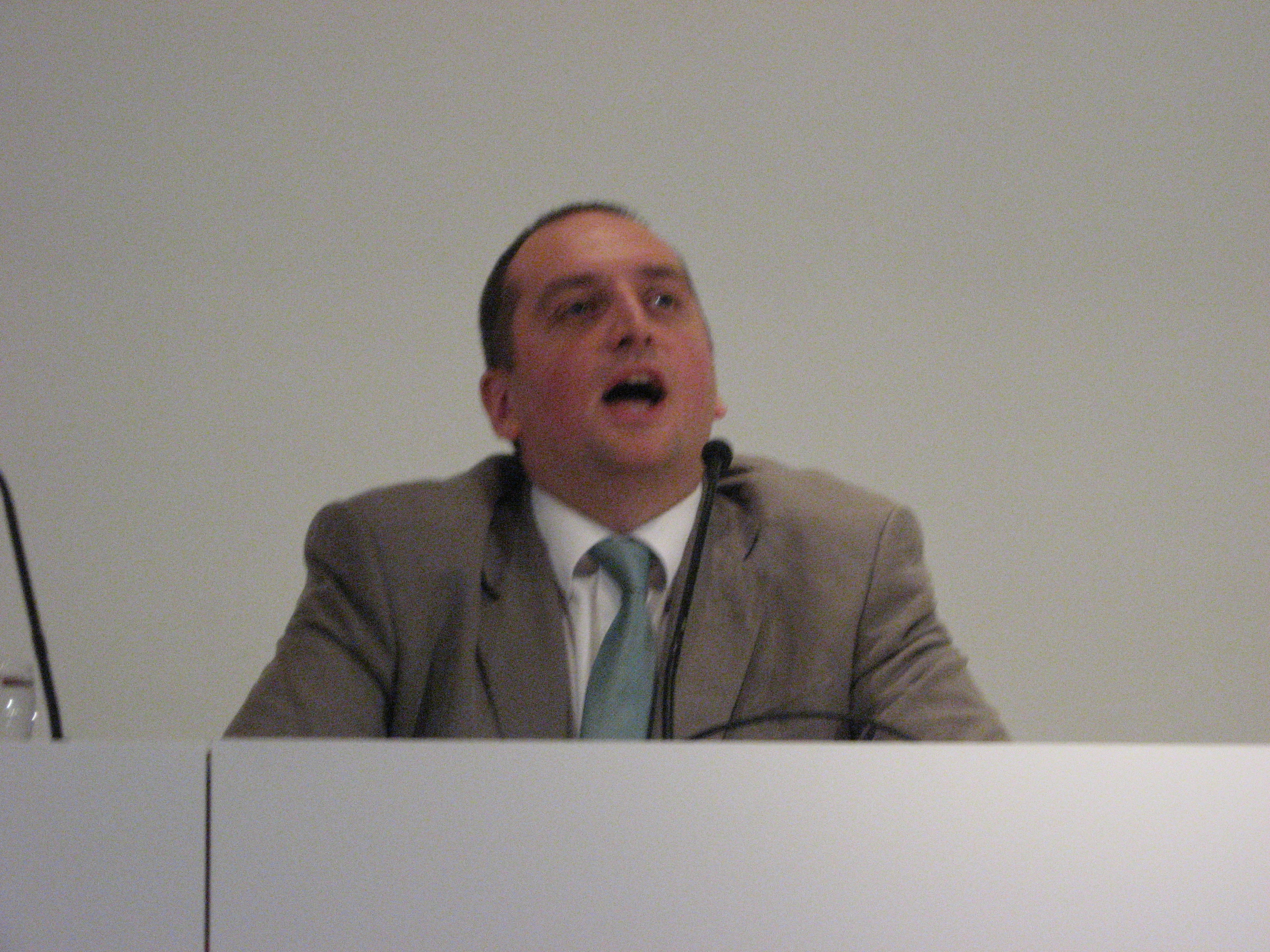
	First party	Second party
Leader	Eric Ollerenshaw	Toby Harris
Party	Conservative	Labour
Leader's seat	Additional member	Brent and Harrow
Seats won	9	9
Constituency vote	526,422	501,296
Percentage	33.2%	31.6%
Party vote	481,053	502,874
Percentage	29.0%	30.3%
	Third party	Fourth party
Leader	Graham Tope	Darren Johnson
Party	Liberal Democrats	Green
Leader's seat	Additional member	Additional member
Seats won	4	3
Constituency vote	299,998	162,457
Percentage	18.9%	10.2%
Party vote	245,555	183,910
Percentage	14.8%	11.1%

The first elections for members of the London Assembly were held on 4 May 2000, alongside the first mayoral election.

The assembly elections used the additional member system, a form of mixed member proportional representation, with 14 directly elected constituencies and 11 London-wide top-up seats.

== Results ==

2000 London Assembly election
Parties	Additional member system										Total seats		
Parties	Constituency					Region					Total seats		
Parties	Votes	%	+/−	Seats	+/−	Votes	%	+/−	Seats	+/−	Total	+/−	%
Labour	501,296	31.6		6		502,874	30.3		3		9		36.0
Conservative	526,422	33.2		8		481,053	29.0		1		9		36.0
Liberal Democrats	299,998	18.9		0		245,555	14.8		4		4		16.0
Green	162,457	10.2		0		183,910	11.1		3		3		12.0
CPA	-	-		-		55,192	3.3		0		0		-
BNP	-	-		-		47,670	2.9		0		0		-
UKIP	2,115	0.1		0		34,054	2.1		0		0		-
London Socialist	46,530	2.9		0		27,073	1.6		0		0		-
Independent - Peter Tatchell	-	-		-		22,862	1.4		0		0		-
Campaign Against Tube Privatisation	-	-		-		17,401	1.0		0		0		-
Socialist Labour	-	-		-		13,690	0.8		0		0		-
Pro-Motorist Small Shop	-	-		-		13,248	0.8		0		0		-
Natural Law	-	-		-		7,559	0.5		0		0		-
Communist	-	-		-		7,489	0.5		0		0		-
Independent	31,195	2.0		0		-	-		-		-		-
Havering Residents Association	12,831	0.8		0		-	-		-		-		-
Humanist	1,261	0.1		0		-	-		-		-	-	-
Reform 2000	1,144	0.1		0		-	-		-		-		-
Communist League	536	0.0		0		-	-		-		-		-
Total	1,585,785			14		1,659,630			11		25		

Constituency Vote
Conservative	33.2%
Labour	31.6%
Liberal Democrats	18.9%
Green	10.2%
Others	6.1%

London wide Vote
Labour	30.3%
Conservative	29.0%
Liberal Democrats	14.8%
Green	11.1%
Others	14.8%

Assembly seats
Labour	36.0%
Conservative	36.0%
Liberal Democrats	16.0%
Green	12.0%

== Constituency candidates ==
Constituency	Conservative	Labour	Lib Dems	Green	LSA	Others
Barnet & Camden	Brian Coleman (41,583, 1st)	Helen Gordon (41,032, 2nd)	Jonathan Davies (22,295, 3rd)	Miranda Dunn (14,768, 4th)	Candy Udwin (3,488, 5th)	Magnus Nielsen (UKIP) (2,115, 6th); Diane Derksen (Maharishi) (1,081, 7th)
Bexley & Bromley	Bob Neill (64,879, 1st)	Charlie Mansell (30,320, 2nd)	Duncan Borrowman (29,710, 3rd)	Ian Jardin (11,124, 4th)	Jean Kysow (1,403, 5th)	
Brent & Harrow	Bob Blackman (32,295, 2nd)	Toby Harris (36,675, 1st)	Chris Noyce (17,161, 3rd)	Simone Aspis (8,756, 4th)	Austin Burnett (2,546, 5th)	
City & East	Syed Kamall (19,266, 2nd)	John Biggs (45,387, 1st)	Janet Ludlow (18,300, 3rd)	Peter Howell (11,939, 4th)	Kambiz Boomla (3,908, 5th)	
Croydon & Sutton	Andrew Pelling (48,421, 1st)	Maggie Mansell (29,514, 3rd)	Anne Gallop (30,614, 2nd)	Peter Hickson (8,884, 4th)	Mark Steel (1,823, 5th)	
Ealing & Hillingdon	Richard Barnes (44,850, 1st)	Gurcharan Singh (38,038, 2nd)	Mike Cox (22,177, 3rd)	Graham Lee (11,788, 4th)	Nick Grant (2,977, 5th)	
Enfield & Haringey	Peter Forrest (31,207, 2nd)	Nicky Gavron (34,509, 1st)	Sean Hooker (14,319, 3rd)	Peter Budge (10,761, 5th)	Weyman Bennett (3,671, 6th)	Richard Course (Ind) (12,581, 4th)
Greenwich & Lewisham	Rhodri Harris (22,401, 2nd)	Len Duvall (40,386, 1st)	David Buxton (16,290, 3rd)	Terry Liddle (11,839, 4th)	Ian Page (3,981, 5th)	
Havering & Redbridge	Roger Evans (40,919, 1st)	Chris Robbins (32,650, 2nd)	Geoffrey Seeff (14,028, 3rd)	Ashley Gunstock (6,803, 5th)	George Taylor (1,744, 6th)	Ian Wilkes (HRA) (12,831, 4th)
Lambeth & Southwark	Irene Kimm (19,238, 3rd)	Val Shawcross (37,985, 1st)	Peter Facey (22,492, 2nd)	Storm Poorun (13,242, 4th)	Theresa Bennett (6,231, 5th)	Tony Robinson (Humanist) (1,261, 6th); Jonathan Silberman (Comm. League) (536, 7th)
Merton & Wandsworth	Elizabeth Howlett (45,023, 1st)	Maggie Cosin (32,438, 2nd)	Siobhan Vitelli (12,496, 3rd)	Rajeev Thacker (8,491, 5th)	Sarbani Mazumdar (1,450, 7th)	Mark Thompson (Ind Lab) (11,918, 4th); Syed Manzoor (Ind) (1,465, 6th); Terence Sullivan (Ind) (1,049, 8th)
North East	Eric Ollerenshaw (20,975, 3rd)	Meg Hillier (42,459, 1st)	Paul Fox (24,856, 2nd)	Yen Chit Chong (18,382, 4th)	Cecelia Prosper (8,269, 5th)	Paul Shaer (Ind) (1,501, 6th); Erol Basarik (Reform 2000) (1,144, 7th)
South West	Tony Arbour (48,248, 1st)	Jagdish Sharma (31,065, 3rd)	Geoff Pope (41,189, 2nd)	Judy Maciejowska (13,426, 4th)	Danny Faith (2,319, 5th)	
West Central	Angie Bray (47,117, 1st)	Kate Green (28,838, 2nd)	Jon Burden (14,071, 3rd)	Julia Stephenson (12,254, 4th)	Christine Blower (2,720, 5th)	Stephen Smith (Homeless) (1,600, 6th)
Source: London Elects

== London-wide list candidates ==
2000 London Assembly election: Additional members
List	Candidates	Votes	Of total (%)	± from prev.
Labour	Trevor Phillips, Samantha Heath, David Lammy, Jennette Arnold, Joe Docherty, Diana Johnson, Abdul Asad, Pam Wharfe, Talal Karim, Katy Thorne, Navin Shah	502,874	30.30	New
Conservative	Bob Neill, Eric Ollerenshaw, Syed Kamall, Rhodri Harris, Roger Evans, Tony Arbour, Andrew Pelling, Irene Kimm, Elizabeth Howlett, Lurline Champagnie, Richard Barnes, Victoria Borwick, Bernard Gentry, Michael Flynn, Patti Komlosty Bob Blackman, Peter Forrest, Diane Henry, Robert Moreland, Harry Stokes, Piers Wauchope, David Williams, Cheryl Potter	481,053	29.0	New
Liberal Democrats	Sally Hamwee, Graham Tope, Lynne Featherstone, Louise Bloom, Mike Tuffrey, Geoff Pope, Meher Khan, Duncan Borrowman, Chris Noyce, Monroe Palmer, Meral Ece	245,555	14.8	New
Green	Darren Johnson,Victor Anderson, Jenny Jones, Noel Lynch, Shane Collins, Hilary Jago, Ashley Gunstock, John Street, Jayne Forbes, Simone Aspis, Catherine Mukhopadhyay	183,910	11.1	New
CPA	Balram Gidoomal, David Bruno Campanale, Susan Jane May, Andrew Kenneth Farmer, Ellen Sheila Greco, Deepak Mahtani, Nigel John Graydon Poole, Mrs. Phillipa Jane Berry, Stuart Charles MacPherson, Timothy John Conisbee Ward, Peter Hartley Wolstenholme	55,192	3.3	New
BNP	David Hill, Peter Hart, Ken Francis, Michael Davidson, Paul Ferguson,Frank Walsh	47,670	2.87	New
UKIP	Damian Hockney, Christopher Pratt, Anthony van der Elst, Anthony Scholefield, Gregory Sylsz, John de Roeck, Robert Bryant, Gerald Roberts, James Feisenberger, Mark Lester, Penelope Weald	34,054	2.05	New
London Socialist	Paul Foot, Greg Tucker, Janine Booth, Christine Blower, Theresa Bennett, Anne Murphy, Kate Ford, Tobias Abse, Jean Kysow, George Taylor, Mark Steel	27,073	1.63	New
Independent	Peter Tatchell	17,401	1.4	New
Campaign Against Tube Privatisation	Patrick William Sikorski, Oliver Edgley New, Catherine Effer, Robert Alan Law, Pamela Leah Slinger, Enoh Itejere, Brian Munro, Arwyn Huw Thomas, Lewis Peacock, Graham Michael Campbell, David Lyons	17,401	1.05	New
Socialist Labour	Arthur Scargill, Amanda May Rose, Harpal Brar, Margaret Mary Sharkey, Hardev Singh Dhillon, Nicola Jane Hoarau, Geoff Palmer, Novjot Brar, Robert John Siggins, Eloisa Joan Rule, John David Hayball	13,690	0.8	New
Pro-Motorist Small Shop	Geoffrey Maurice Ben-Nathan, Brian Bartle, Russell Stephen Conway, Joseph Pronckus	13,248	0.80	New
Natural Law	Richard Peter Johnson, Judith Muriel Thomas, Alexander Maurice Alers Hankey, Gerard Joseph Valente, Jean Livesley, Juliette Taylor-Elwes, Jonathan Robert Hinde, Michael Leslie Mears	7,559	0.46	New
Communist	Nick Wright, Sandra Lusk, James Beavis, Monty Goldman, Anita Halpin, Anita Wright Kevin Halpin, Richard Maybin	7,489	0.45	New

== London Assembly representation ==
- Labour - 9
- Conservative - 9
- Liberal Democrat - 4
- Green Party - 3

== Party leaders in 2000 ==
- Labour: Tony Blair
- Conservative: William Hague
- Liberal Democrats: Charles Kennedy
- Green: Mike Woodin and Margaret Wright

== See also ==
- London Assembly
