= Merton and Wandsworth (London Assembly constituency) =

- Territorial constituency for the London Assembly
- Merton and Wandsworth shown within London
- Created: 2000
- Number of members: One
- Member: Leonie Cooper
- Party: Labour
- Last election: 2024
- Next election: 2028

Merton and Wandsworth is a constituency in the London Assembly. Since the 2016 election, it has been represented by Labour's Leonie Cooper.

As its name suggests, the constituency consists of the combined area of the London Borough of Merton and the London Borough of Wandsworth.

== Constituency profile ==
Created in 2000, Merton and Wandsworth had elected only Conservative AMs until 2016, when current AM Leonie Cooper of the Labour Party was elected.

It has also proved to be a bellwether, voting for the winning Mayoral candidate in every election since the post was contested in 2000.

== Assembly members ==
Election	Member	Party
2000	Elizabeth Howlett	Conservative
2008	Richard Tracey	Conservative
2016	Leonie Cooper	Labour

== Assembly election results ==
=== Elections in the 2020s ===
2024 London Assembly election: Merton and Wandsworth
Party	Candidate	Constituency			List		
Party	Candidate	Votes	%	±%	Votes	%	±%
Labour	Leonie Cooper (Note: Incumbent member for this constituency)	77,235	43.97	▲2.30	70,995	40.39	▲3.14
Conservative	Ellie Cox	49,812	28.36	▼5.30	44,769	25.47	▼5.34
Liberal Democrats	Sue Wixley	21,418	12.19	▲1.80	19,372	11.02	▲2.24
Green	Pippa Maslin	19,124	10.89	▼1.70	19,473	11.08	▼1.58
Reform	Tania Marszalek	8,063	4.59	▲2.89	7,247	4.12	▲3.34
Rejoin EU					4,622	2.63	▲0.71
Animal Welfare					2,842	1.62	▼0.02
SDP					1,457	0.83	▲0.56
Britain First					1,396	0.79	New
CPA					1,339	0.76	▼0.13
Independent	Laurence Fox				876	0.50	New
Communist					568	0.32	▲0.07
Independent	Farah London				380	0.22	New
Heritage					369	0.21	▼0.23
Independent	Gabe Romualdo				69	0.04	New
Majority		27,423	15.5	▲7.5			
Valid votes		175,652			175,774		
Invalid votes		1,171			1,071		
Turnout		176,823	46.0	▼1.0	176,845	46.0	
Registered electors		387,795					
Labour hold		Swing		▲3.8			

2021 London Assembly election: Merton and Wandsworth
Party	Candidate	Constituency			List		
Party	Candidate	Votes	%	±%	Votes	%	±%
Labour	Leonie Cooper	75,468	41.67	▼0.04	67,251	37.25	▼0.08
Conservative	Louise Calland	60,968	33.66	▼5.73	55,625	30.81	▼4.93
Green	Pippa Maslin	22,793	12.58	▲4.66	22,852	12.66	▲4.78
Liberal Democrats	Sue Wixley	18,818	10.39	▲4.60	15,860	8.78	▲2.82
Women's Equality					3,985	2.21	▼1.82
Rejoin EU					3,460	1.92	New
Reform	Roger Gravett	3,080	1.70	New	1,421	0.79	New
Animal Welfare					2,959	1.64	▲0.67
CPA					1,608	0.89	▼0.05
UKIP					1,184	0.66	▼3.56
London Real					1,018	0.56	New
Let London Live					851	0.47	New
Heritage					802	0.44	New
SDP					482	0.27	New
Communist					462	0.26	New
TUSC					362	0.20	New
Londependence					251	0.14	New
National Liberal					130	0.07	New
Majority		14,500	8.00	▲5.7			
Valid votes		181,127			180,563		
Invalid votes		2,417			2,992		
Turnout		183,544	47.0	▼3.0	183,555	47.3	
Registered electors		387,795					
Labour hold		Swing		▲2.8			

=== Elections in the 2010s ===
2016 London Assembly election: Merton and Wandsworth
Party	Candidate	Constituency			List		
Party	Candidate	Votes	%	±%	Votes	%	±%
Labour	Leonie Cooper	77,340	41.71	▲5.17	69,230	37.32	▲1.75
Conservative	David Dean	73,039	39.39	▼3.75	66,276	35.73	▼4.79
Green	Esther Obiri-Darko	14,682	7.92	▲0.44	14,607	7.88	▼0.69
Liberal Democrats	Adrian Hyyrylainen-Trett	10,732	5.79	▼2.09	11,068	5.97	▼0.57
UKIP	Elizabeth Jones	8,478	4.57	▲2.11	7,822	4.22	▲0.97
Women's Equality					7,467	4.03	New
Respect					2,027	1.09	New
Britain First					1,919	1.03	New
Animal Welfare					1,800	0.97	New
CPA					1,750	0.94	▼0.87
Independent	Thamilini Kulendran	1,142	0.62	▼0.99			
BNP					766	0.41	▼0.93
The House Party					750	0.40	▲0.05
Majority		4,301	2.3	N/A			
Valid votes		185,413			185,482		
Invalid votes		2,042			1,982		
Turnout		187,455	50.0	▲0.2	187,464	50.1	▲0.2
Registered electors		374,133					
Labour gain from Conservative		Swing		▲4.5			

2012 London Assembly election: Merton and Wandsworth
Party	Candidate	Constituency			List		
Party	Candidate	Votes	%	±%	Votes	%	±%
Conservative	Richard Tracey	65,197	43.1	▼1.8	61,476	40.5	Steady
Labour	Leonie Cooper	55,216	36.5	▲7.3	53,978	35.6	▲8.4
Liberal Democrats	Lisa Smart	11,904	7.9	▼2.4	9,925	6.5	▼3.2
Green	Roy Vickery	11,307	7.5	▼1.0	12,990	8.6	▼0.9
UKIP	Mazhar Manzoor	3,717	2.5	▼0.1	4,927	3.2	▲2.0
CPA					2,744	1.8	▼0.8
Independent	Thamilini Kulendran	2,424	1.6	New			
BNP					2,038	1.3	▼1.9
Socialist (GB)	Bill Martin	1,343	0.9	New			
English Democrat					1,021	0.7	▼0.1
TUSC					904	0.6	New
The House Party					536	0.4	New
Independent	Rathy Alagratnam				428	0.3	Steady
Independent	Ijaz Hayat				383	0.3	New
National Front					368	0.2	New
Majority		9,981	6.6	▼9.1			
Valid votes		151,108			151,718		
Invalid votes		2,677			2,131		
Turnout		153,785	40.9	▼5.3	153,849	40.9	▼5.4
Registered electors		376,365					
Conservative hold		Swing		▼4.6			

=== Elections in the 2000s ===
2008 London Assembly election: Merton and Wandsworth
Party	Candidate	Constituency			Lis		
Party	Candidate	Votes	%	±%	Votes	%	±%
Conservative	Richard Tracey	75,103	44.9	▲8.1	68,075	40.5	▲7.0
Labour	Leonie Cooper	48,810	29.2	▲5.2	45,675	27.2	▲1.1
Liberal Democrats	Shas Sheehan	17,187	10.3	▼3.3	16,285	9.7	▼4.9
Green	Roy Vickery	14,124	8.4	▲0.7	15,859	9.4	▼0.4
BNP					5,437	3.2	
UKIP	Strachen McDonald	4,286	2.6	▼3.8	2,143	1.3	▼4.8
CPA	Ellen Greco	4,053	2.4	▲0.3	4,427	2.6	▼0.4
Abolish the Congestion Charge					4,049	2.4	New
Respect					2,445	1.5	▼2.0
English Democrat	Steve Scott	2,160	1.3	New	1,351	0.8	New
Left List	Kris Stewart	1,714	1.0	New	1,251	0.7	New
Independent	Rathy Alagaratnam				409	0.2	New
Unity for Peace & Socialism					349	0.2	New
One London					187	0.1	New
Majority		26,293	15.7	▲2.2			
Valid votes		167,437			167,942		
Invalid votes		6,649			5,377		
Turnout		170,962	47.2	▲8.6	170,841	46.3	
Registered electors		362,542					
Conservative hold		Swing		▲1.5			

2004 London Assembly election: Merton and Wandsworth
Party	Candidate	Constituency			List		
Party	Candidate	Votes	%	±%	Votes	%	±%
Conservative	Elizabeth Howlett	48,295	38.8	–0.7	42,984	33.5	+0.5
Labour	Kathryn Smith	31,417	25.3	–3.0	33,428	26.1	–3.5
Liberal Democrats	Andrew Martin	17,864	14.4	+3.5	18,760	14.6	+2.3
Green	Roy Vickery	10,163	8.2	+0.8	12,619	9.8	–2.0
UKIP	Adrian Roberts	8,327	6.7	New	7,785	6.1	+4.2
Respect	Ruairidh Maclean	4,297	3.4	New	4,439	3.5	New
BNP					4,200	3.3	+1.4
CPA	Ellen Greco	2,782	2.2	New	3,795	3.0	–0.5
Independent	Rathy Alagaratnam	1,240	1.0	New			
Alliance for Diversity in Community					228	0.2	New
Majority		16,878	13.5	+2.3			
Valid votes		124,379			128,238		
Invalid votes		6,993			3,134		
Turnout		131,372	38.6	+2.1			
Registered electors		340,792					
Conservative hold		Swing					

2000 London Assembly election: Merton and Wandsworth
Party	Candidate	Constituency		List	
Party	Candidate	Votes	%	Votes	%
Conservative	Elizabeth Howlett	45,023	39.5	38,122	33.0
Labour	Maggie Cosin	32,438	28.3	34,167	29.6
Liberal Democrats	Siobhan Vitelli	12,496	10.9	14,199	12.3
Independent Labour	Mark Thompson	11,918	10.4		
Green	Rajeev Thacker	8,491	7.4	13,631	11.8
CPA				3,969	3.4
BNP				2,176	1.9
UKIP				2,122	1.8
Independent	Peter Tatchell			1,703	1.5
Independent	Syed Manzoor	1,465	1.3		
London Socialist	Sarbani Mazumdar	1,450	1.3	1,264	1.1
Campaign Against Tube Privatisation				1,393	1.2
Independent	Terence Sullivan	1,049	0.9		
Socialist Labour				863	0.8
Pro-Motorist Small Shop				843	0.7
Natural Law				494	0.4
Communist				441	0.4
Majority		12,870	11.2		
Turnout		114,615	34.1	115,387	34.3
Registered electors		335,934			
Conservative win (new seat)					

== Mayoral election results ==
Below are the results for the candidate which received the highest share of the popular vote in the constituency at each mayoral election.

Year	Party	Candidate
2000	Independent	Ken Livingstone
2004	Labour	Ken Livingstone
2008	Conservative	Boris Johnson
2012	Conservative	Boris Johnson
2016	Labour	Sadiq Khan
2021	Labour	Sadiq Khan
2024	Labour	Sadiq Khan

2024 London mayoral election (Merton and Wandsworth)
Party	Candidate	Votes	%	±%
Labour	Sadiq Khan	84,725	48.1	N/A
Conservative	Susan Hall	50,976	28.9	N/A
Liberal Democrats	Rob Blackie	13,153	7.46	N/A
Green	Zoë Garbett	9,646	5.47	N/A
Reform	Howard Cox	4,495	2.55	N/A
Independent	Natalie Campbell	3,439	1.95	N/A
SDP	Amy Gallagher	2,192	1.24	N/A
Animal Welfare	Femy Amin	2,018	1.14	N/A
Count Binface for Mayor of London	Count Binface	1,889	1.07	N/A
Independent	Andreas Michli	1,359	0.771	N/A
Independent	Tarun Ghulati	1030	0.584	N/A
Britain First	Nick Scanlon	961	0.545	N/A
London Real	Brian Rose	376	0.213	N/A
Turnout		176,930	46%	−1.4%
Rejected ballots		671		
Registered electors		384,678		+0.804%

2021 London mayoral election (Merton and Wandsworth)
Party	Candidate	1st round		2nd round			1st round votesTransfer votes, 2nd round
Party	Candidate	Total	Of round	Transfers	Total	Of round	1st round votesTransfer votes, 2nd round
Labour	Sadiq Khan	76,403	42.9%				
Conservative	Shaun Bailey	59,460	33.3%				
Green	Siân Berry	14,050	7.88%				
Liberal Democrats	Luisa Porritt	9,445	5.3%				
Reclaim	Laurence Fox	3,334	1.87%				
Independent	Niko Omilana	2,202	1.23%				
Rejoin EU	Richard Hewison	1,870	1.05%				
London Real	Brian Rose	1,869	1.05%				
Count Binface for Mayor of London	Count Binface	1,865	1.05%				
Women's Equality	Mandu Reid	1,535	0.861%				
Let London Live	Piers Corbyn	1,090	0.611%				
Animal Welfare	Vanessa Hudson	1,057	0.593%				
UKIP	Peter John Gammons	644	0.361%				
Independent	Farah London	607	0.34%				
Heritage	David Kurten	568	0.319%				
Independent	Max Fosh	512	0.287%				
Renew	Kam Balayev	509	0.285%				
Independent	Nims Obunge	479	0.269%				
SDP	Steve Kelleher	478	0.268%				
Burning Pink	Valerie Brown	325	0.182%				
Turnout		183,776	47.4%				
Registered electors		387,795					

2016 London mayoral election (Merton and Wandsworth)
Party	Candidate	1st round		2nd round			1st round votesTransfer votes, 2nd round
Party	Candidate	Total	Of round	Transfers	Total	Of round	1st round votesTransfer votes, 2nd round
Labour	Sadiq Khan	80,291	43.4%				
Conservative	Zac Goldsmith	72,952	39.4%				
Green	Siân Berry	9,865	5.33%				
Liberal Democrats	Caroline Pidgeon	7,723	4.17%				
UKIP	Peter Whittle	4,096	2.21%				
Women's Equality	Sophie Walker	3,822	2.07%				
Respect	George Galloway	1,706	0.922%				
Britain First	Paul Golding	1,425	0.77%				
Cannabis is Safer than Alcohol	Lee Eli Harris	1,232	0.666%				
Independent	Prince Zylinski	1,045	0.565%				
BNP	David Furness	631	0.341%				
One Love	Ankit Love	227	0.123%				
Turnout		187,588	50.1%				
Registered electors		374,133					

2012 London mayoral election (Merton and Wandsworth)
Party	Candidate	1st round		2nd round			1st round votesTransfer votes, 2nd round
Party	Candidate	Total	Of round	Transfers	Total	Of round	1st round votesTransfer votes, 2nd round
Conservative	Boris Johnson	77,360	51%				
Labour	Ken Livingstone	51,144	33.7%				
Independent	Siobhan Benita	7,597	5.01%				
Green	Jenny Jones	6,359	4.19%				
Liberal Democrats	Brian Paddick	5,909	3.89%				
UKIP	Lawrence Webb	2,102	1.39%				
BNP	Carlos Cortiglia	1,297	0.855%				
Turnout		154,018	40.9%				
Registered electors		376,365					

2008 London mayoral election (Merton and Wandsworth)
Party	Candidate	1st round		2nd round			1st round votesTransfer votes, 2nd round
Party	Candidate	Total	Of round	Transfers	Total	Of round	1st round votesTransfer votes, 2nd round
Conservative	Boris Johnson	77,236	46%				
Labour	Ken Livingstone	60,636	36.1%				
Liberal Democrats	Brian Paddick	16,167	9.63%				
Green	Siân Berry	5,850	3.49%				
BNP	Richard Barnbrook	2,883	1.72%				
Christian Choice	Alan Craig	2,363	1.41%				
UKIP	Gerard Batten	1,056	0.629%				
Left List	Lindsey German	872	0.519%				
English Democrat	Matt O'Connor	510	0.304%				
Independent	Winston McKenzie	286	0.17%				
Turnout		170,156	46.9%				
Registered electors		362,542					

2004 London mayoral election (Merton and Wandsworth)
Party	Candidate	1st round		2nd round			1st round votesTransfer votes, 2nd round
Party	Candidate	Total	Of round	Transfers	Total	Of round	1st round votesTransfer votes, 2nd round
Labour	Ken Livingstone	51,182	40%				
Conservative	Steve Norris	40,423	31.6%				
Liberal Democrats	Simon Hughes	16,847	13.2%				
UKIP	Frank Maloney	5,810	4.54%				
Green	Darren Johnson	4,200	3.28%				
Respect	Lindsey German	2,910	2.27%				
CPA	Ram Gidoomal	2,740	2.14%				
BNP	Julian Leppert	2,737	2.14%				
Independent	Tammy Nagalingam	566	0.442%				
Independent Working Class Action	Lorna Reid	531	0.415%				
Turnout		131,371	38.5%				
Registered electors		340,792					

2000 London mayoral election (Merton and Wandsworth)
Party	Candidate	1st round		2nd round			1st round votesTransfer votes, 2nd round
Party	Candidate	Total	Of round	Transfers	Total	Of round	1st round votesTransfer votes, 2nd round
Independent	Ken Livingstone	46,216	38.4%				
Conservative	Steve Norris	36,237	30.1%				
Labour	Frank Dobson	14,436	12%				
Liberal Democrats	Susan Kramer	13,752	11.4%				
CPA	Ram Gidoomal	3,162	2.63%				
Green	Darren Johnson	2,713	2.26%				
BNP	Michael Newland	1,468	1.22%				
UKIP	Damian Hockney	979	0.814%				
Pro-Motorist Small Shop	Geoffrey Ben-Nathan	502	0.417%				
Independent	Ashwin Kumar	496	0.412%				
Natural Law	Geoffrey Clements	325	0.27%				
Turnout		122,540	36.5%				
Registered electors		335,934					
