= Richard Tracey =

British politician and presenter (1943–2020)

Richard Tracey JP

Under-Secretary of State for Sport
- In office September 1985 – June 1987
- Prime Minister: Margaret Thatcher
- Preceded by: Neil Macfarlane
- Succeeded by: Colin Moynihan

Member of the London Assembly for Merton and Wandsworth
- In office 1 May 2008 – 6 May 2016
- Preceded by: Elizabeth Howlett
- Succeeded by: Leonie Cooper

Member of Parliament Surbiton
- In office 9 June 1983 – 8 April 1997
- Preceded by: Nigel Fisher
- Succeeded by: Ed Davey (Kingston and Surbiton)

Personal details
- Born: Richard Patrick Tracey; 8 February 1943 Stratford-upon-Avon
- Died: 19 March 2020 (aged 77)
- Party: Conservative
- Spouse: Katharine Gardner
- Children: 4
- Education: King Edward VI School, Stratford-upon-Avon
- Alma mater: University of Birmingham

Richard Patrick Tracey, JP (8 February 1943 – 19 March 2020), was a British Conservative Party politician, BBC news presenter, and public relations consultant. He was the Member of Parliament for Surbiton from 1983 to 1997, and served as Minister for Sport and Civil Society between 1985 and 1987. He was a Conservative Association campaigner across south-west London from 1978 and a leading figure for the party in the capital, representing the constituency of Merton and Wandsworth on the London Assembly from 2008 until his retirement in 2016. In his later years, he served as the Mayor of London's Ambassador for the River (from 2008), member of the Metropolitan Police Authority (2008–10), vice-chairman of the London Fire and Emergency Planning Authority (2010–2012), and chairman of the London Waste and Recycling Board (2012–16).

== Early life and education ==
Tracey was born in Stratford-upon-Avon as a son of Percival, a corn merchant, and Hilda née Timms. His father died from disabling injuries shortly after World War II and Tracey was raised by his mother. He was educated at the King Edward VI Grammar School in Stratford-upon-Avon from 1954 to 1961, and studied law at the University of Birmingham, graduating with an LLB (Hons) degree in 1964. He joined the Young Conservatives as a student at Birmingham.

== Media career and writing ==
From 1964 to 1966, Tracey was a leader and feature writer for the Beaverbrook Newspapers' titles Daily Express and Evening Citizen. From 1966 to 1978, he worked as a presenter and reporter for the BBC on major TV and radio current affairs programmes and documentaries, including The World at One, Today, 24 Hours and The Money Programme, as well as You and Yours and Wheelbase.

He was the author of World of Motor Sport (with Richard Hudson-Evans), published in 1971, and Hickstead – The First Twelve Years (with Michael Clayton), published in 1972.

He ran the public affairs consultancy Tracey Communications between 1978 and 1983 (its activities included training senior bank executives, industrialists and Crown Agents for media appearances), and another public relations consultancy between 1997 and 2008.

== Political career ==
=== Conservative Party in London ===
Tracey unsuccessfully contested Northampton North in October 1974. Following his departure from the BBC in 1978, he was elected chairman of the Conservative Association in Putney and dedicated himself to campaigning for the party in south-west London. He led the Conservatives' successful 1978 election campaign for the Wandsworth London Borough Council, which subsequently became the party's model for local government, based on lowering the council tax.

He was the deputy chairman of the Greater London Area of the Conservative Party from 1981 to 1983, and at various times the president of the Conservative Association in Tooting. He joined the policy group on the abolition of the Greater London Council.

=== Parliament ===
Tracey was Member of Parliament (MP) for Surbiton from 1983 until 1997, when the constituency was abolished owing to boundary changes. In his maiden speech, he defended the United States president Ronald Reagan's Strategic Defense Initiative, describing national security as "the cornerstone of all our other freedoms". He later urged the prosecution of the 1984–1985 miners' strike leader Arthur Scargill for incitement and unsuccessfully voted to restore capital punishment. He was made parliamentary private secretary by Geoffrey Pattie, the minister of state at the Department of Trade and Industry. Tracey's defence of the activities of the Special Branch against left-wing critics in the Greater London Council won him the favour of Prime Minister Margaret Thatcher.

From 1985 to 1987, he served as the Under-Secretary of State for Sport in Margaret Thatcher's second government, combatting football hooliganism and opposing sports sponsorship by tobacco companies. He was sacked following the 1987 general election over his conflict with the tobacco industry at the instigation of the PM's confidant Nicholas Ridley.

As a backbencher, he served on the Select Committee for Televising the House from 1987 to 1989, and on the Public Accounts Committee from 1993 to 1997. He chaired the London Conservative MPs Group from 1990 to 1997, and was a main supporter of the National Lottery from 1991 to 1992. At the 1997 general election, he unsuccessfully contested the newly created constituency of Kingston and Surbiton, losing to Ed Davey by 56 votes, which represented a 16.5% drop in support compared to the 1992 election.

=== London Assembly ===
Following his electoral defeat, Tracey joined the executive committee of the Association of Former Members of Parliament. He chaired the Conservative Association in Wandsworth from 2003 to 2008. In the 2006 local elections, he helped his party win the Tooting ward.

In 2008, he was elected a member of the London Assembly representing Merton and Wandsworth, and in 2009 became the deputy leader of the Conservative Group and the Conservative lead on transport. He campaigned to outlaw strikes on the London transport system and celebrated the completion of the Overground rail line to Clapham Junction as well as striving to reduce pollution from buses and HGVs in Putney High Street and elsewhere. He also worked on extending the Wimbledon Tramlink to Morden and St Helier. He was Vice-Chairman of the London Fire and Emergency Planning Authority (2010–2012), and Member of the Metropolitan Police Authority (2008–10). In 2008, he was appointed Mayor's Ambassador for the River by Mayor Boris Johnson, in which he pushed successfully to extend the fast river transport service upstream to Putney in 2013 and got new piers at Vauxhall, Battersea Reach and Battersea Power Station. He was Chairman of the London Waste and Recycling Board from 2012 to 2016, with strategies to increase London recycling. He retired in 2016, and his former Merton and Wandsworth seat was then won by Labour's Leonie Cooper.

Tracey was a Freeman of the City of London from 1984 onwards, a Freeman of the Company of Watermen and Lightermen, President of Kingston Regatta and Kingston Rugby Football Club, a Justice of the Peace in Wimbledon from 1977, and a Fellow of the Industry and Parliament Trust from 1985.

=== Controversies ===
The role and extent of non-party organisations in social media advertising during the UK general election of 2019 was examined by BBC journalist Rory Cellan-Jones. Tracey was identified as the sponsor of a Facebook advert that opposed the Jeremy Corbyn-led Labour Party's 2019 pledge to remove charitable status and tax exemptions from private schools in the United Kingdom.

== Personal life ==
He was a resident of Battersea. His wife Katharine Tracey, née Gardner, whom he married in 1974, worked as a telecoms employee, served as a senior councillor on Wandsworth London Borough Council for 29 years, and received the OBE for services to education. They had four children (Simon, Nicola, Emma and Polly) and nine grandchildren.

Tracey died peacefully at home on 19 March 2020, aged 77. Kathy Tracey died in 2021.

Parliament of the United Kingdom
Preceded by Nigel Fisher	Member of Parliament for Surbiton; 1983–1997	Constituency abolished
Political offices
Preceded by Neil Macfarlane	Minister for Sport; 1985–1987	Succeeded by Colin Moynihan
