= Nigel Fisher =

British politician (1913–1996)

Sir Nigel Thomas Loveridge Fisher, MC (14 July 1913 – 9 October 1996) was a British Conservative Party politician.

== Early life ==
Son of naval officer Sir Thomas Fisher and Aimée Constance, daughter of Walter Loveridge, of Oaken, Staffordshire, Fisher was educated at Eton College and Trinity College, Cambridge. He was in the Welsh Guards of the British Army during World War II, serving as a major in northwest Europe. He was awarded the Military Cross on the field in 1945. He became a partner in a London firm of surveyors.

== Parliamentary career ==
Fisher contested Chislehurst in 1945. He was Member of Parliament for Hitchin from 1950 to 1955, and for Surbiton from 1955 to 1983 – preceding Richard Tracey. He was parliamentary private secretary to Gwilym Lloyd George from 1951 and a junior minister for the Colonies from 1962 to 1963, and for Commonwealth Relations and the Colonies from 1963 to 1964.

Fisher wrote in 1973 the first biography of his close friend, the Tory statesman, Iain Macleod. Like Macleod, Fisher was on the liberal wing of the Tory party, opposing capital punishment and supporting homosexual law reform. He was one of two Conservative MPs who refused to vote for the Commonwealth Immigrants Act 1962 and one of fifteen who voted against the Commonwealth Immigrants Act 1968.

== Family ==
In 1935, Fisher married Lady Gloria Vaughan, daughter of Ernest Vaughan, 7th Earl of Lisburne, and had two children. Their son Mark Fisher was a Labour Party MP. He and his first wife divorced in 1952, and in 1956 he married erstwhile Ulster Unionist Party MP Patricia Ford. He was knighted in the 1974 New Year Honours "for political and public services." By his mother's second marriage to the Liberal politician Sir Geoffrey Shakespeare, 1st Baronet, Fisher was half-brother of the medical practitioner Sir William Geoffrey Shakespeare, 2nd Baronet, whose son is the sociologist and bioethicist Tom Shakespeare.

Parliament of the United Kingdom
Preceded by Philip Asterley Jones	Member of Parliament for Hitchin; 1950 – 1955	Succeeded by Martin Maddan
New constituency	Member of Parliament for Surbiton; 1955 – 1983	Succeeded by Richard Tracey
Political offices
Preceded by Hugh Fraser	Under-Secretary of State for the Colonies; 1962–1964; With: Richard Hornby 1963 – 1964	Succeeded by Eirene White; Lord Taylor
