= Surbiton (constituency) =

Parliamentary constituency in the United Kingdom, 1955–1997

- Former borough constituency for the House of Commons
- Boundary of Surbiton in Greater London for the 1983 general election
- County: Surrey (Pre 1965); Greater London (Post 1965)
- Major settlements: Chessington and Surbiton

1955–1997
- Seats: one
- Created from: Kingston-upon-Thames; Esher; Epsom
- Replaced by: Kingston and Surbiton

Surbiton was a borough constituency created for the 1955 general election and abolished for the 1997 general election, in Surrey until 1965 and thereafter in outer south-west London. It returned one Member of Parliament (MP) to the House of Commons of the Parliament of the United Kingdom by the first past the post system of election.

== History ==
This was in the safe/marginal seat spectrum irrefutably a safe Conservative seat during its 32-year lifetime. The party positioned in second position was also unchanged until it changed once in the course of the seat's history. The election when this change took place was the 1983 United Kingdom general election. The narrowest majority was the General Election 1966 at 15.7%.

== Boundaries ==
1955–1974: The Municipal Borough of Surbiton.

1974–1983: The London Borough of Kingston upon Thames wards of Berrylands, Chessington, Hook and Southborough, St Mark's and Seething Wells, Surbiton Hill, Tolworth East, Tolworth South, and Tolworth West.

1983–1997: The London Borough of Kingston upon Thames wards of Berrylands, Chessington North, Chessington South, Hook, St Mark's, Surbiton Hill, Tolworth East, Tolworth South, and Tolworth West.

The constituency was made up of the eastern part of the Royal Borough of Kingston upon Thames in south-west London, centred on the area of Surbiton. In 1997, it was absorbed into the new and larger Kingston and Surbiton constituency after the Boundary Commission for England recommended that a seat be lost in the twinned boroughs of Kingston and Richmond.

== Members of Parliament ==
Election	Member	Party	Notes
1955	Sir Nigel Fisher	Conservative	Member for Hitchin (1950–1955)
1983	Richard Tracey	Conservative	Minister for Sport (1985–1987); Contested Kingston and Surbiton following redistribution
1997	constituency abolished: see Kingston and Surbiton		

== Election results ==
=== Elections in the 1950s ===
General election 1955: Surbiton
Party	Candidate	Votes	%
Conservative	Nigel Fisher	22,863	64.9
Labour	S Gordon Richards	12,380	35.1
Majority		10,483	29.7
Turnout		35,243	79.5
Registered electors		44,331	
Conservative win (new seat)			

General election 1959: Surbiton
Party	Candidate	Votes	%	±%
Conservative	Nigel Fisher	24,058	67.4	+2.5
Labour	Arthur Imisson	11,633	32.6	–2.5
Majority		12,425	34.8	+5.1
Turnout		35,691	79.0	–0.5
Registered electors		45,165		
Conservative hold		Swing	+2.5	

=== Elections in the 1960s ===
General election 1964: Surbiton
Party	Candidate	Votes	%	±%
Conservative	Nigel Fisher	20,499	60.6	–6.8
Labour	D Eric Heather	13,337	39.4	+6.8
Majority		7,162	21.2	–13.6
Turnout		33,836	75.4	–3.6
Registered electors		44,846		
Conservative hold		Swing	–6.8	

General election 1966: Surbiton
Party	Candidate	Votes	%	±%
Conservative	Nigel Fisher	19,989	57.9	–2.7
Labour	D Eric Heather	14,561	42.1	+2.7
Majority		5,428	15.7	–5.5
Turnout		34,550	77.0	+1.5
Registered electors		44,894		
Conservative hold		Swing	–2.7	

=== Elections in the 1970s ===
General election 1970: Surbiton
Party	Candidate	Votes	%	±%
Conservative	Nigel Fisher	17,359	51.7	–6.1
Labour	Rusi Kerr-Walter	10,469	31.2	–11.0
Liberal	Christopher Green	4,027	12.0	New
Independent Powell Conservative	Edgar Scruby	1,706	5.1	New
Majority		6,890	20.5	+4.7
Turnout		33,561	70.4	–6.5
Registered electors		47,661		
Conservative hold		Swing	+2.4	

General election February 1974: Surbiton
Party	Candidate	Votes	%	±%
Conservative	Nigel Fisher	17,176	45.6	–6.1
Liberal	D Brooke	10,676	28.3	+16.3
Labour	Andrew MacKinlay	9,813	26.1	–5.1
Majority		6,500	17.3	–3.3
Turnout		37,665	82.2	+11.8
Registered electors		45,801		
Conservative hold		Swing	–11.2	

General election October 1974: Surbiton
Party	Candidate	Votes	%	±%
Conservative	Nigel Fisher	15,330	45.7	+0.1
Labour	Andrew MacKinlay	9,309	27.7	+1.7
Liberal	D Brooke	8,931	26.6	–1.7
Majority		6,021	17.9	+0.7
Turnout		33,570	72.9	–9.4
Registered electors		46,065		
Conservative hold		Swing	–0.8	

General election 1979: Surbiton
Party	Candidate	Votes	%	±%
Conservative	Nigel Fisher	20,063	56.6	+11.0
Labour	Colin Moore	9,261	26.1	–1.6
Liberal	Christine Tilley	6,093	17.2	–9.4
Majority		10,802	30.5	+12.6
Turnout		35,417	75.5	+2.6
Registered electors		46,922		
Conservative hold		Swing	+6.3	

1979 notional result
Party	Vote	%
Conservative	19,989	56.7
Labour	9,189	26.1
Liberal	6,085	17.3
Turnout	35,263	
Electorate		

=== Elections in the 1980s ===
General election 1983: Surbiton
Party	Candidate	Votes	%	±%
Conservative	Richard Tracey	18,245	54.5	–2.2
SDP	Christopher Nowakowski	9,496	28.4	+11.1
Labour	Nigel Waskett	5,173	15.5	–10.6
Ecology	Jim Macellan	551	1.6	New
Majority		8,749	26.1	–4.5
Turnout		33,465	71.3	
Registered electors		46,949		
Conservative hold		Swing	–6.6	

General election 1987: Surbiton
Party	Candidate	Votes	%	±%
Conservative	Richard Tracey	19,861	55.9	+1.3
SDP	David Burke	10,120	28.5	+0.1
Labour	Allister McGowan	5,111	14.4	–1.1
Green	Jean Vidler	465	1.3	–0.3
Majority		9,741	27.4	+1.3
Turnout		35,557	78.3	+7.0
Registered electors		45,428		
Conservative hold		Swing	+0.6	

=== Elections in the 1990s ===
General election 1992: Surbiton
Party	Candidate	Votes	%	±%
Conservative	Richard Tracey	19,033	54.4	−1.4
Liberal Democrats	Barbara Janke	9,394	26.9	−1.6
Labour	Robin Hutchinson	6,384	18.3	+3.9
Natural Law	W Parker	161	0.5	New
Majority		9,639	27.6	+0.2
Turnout		34,972	82.4	+4.2
Registered electors		42,421		
Conservative hold		Swing	+0.1	

== See also ==
- List of parliamentary constituencies in London
