= Noel Lynch =

British politician (1947–2021)

Member of the London Assembly as an additional member
- In office 2 May 2003 – 10 June 2004
- Preceded by: Victor Anderson
- Succeeded by: Damian Hockney

Personal details
- Born: 20 January 1947
- Died: 3 August 2021 (aged 74)
- Party: Green Party
- Spouse: Diane Burstein Lynch
- Children: Michelle Lynch

Noel Lynch (20 January 1947 – 3 August 2021) was an Irish politician living in England and a member of the Green Party of England and Wales. He represented the Green Party on the London Assembly between 2 May 2003 and 10 June 2004, after replacing Victor Anderson who resigned. Due to a fall in the Green vote, he did not retain his seat at the 2004 London Assembly election, leaving Darren Johnson and Jenny Jones as the remaining members of the London Assembly Green Group. He was Co-ordinator of the London Federation of Green Parties.

== Early life and career ==
Lynch grew up in Kilmallock, County Limerick, in Ireland before moving to London in 1986. He was the convenor of the London Federation of Green Parties and Co-Convenor of the Green Party Trade Union Group. Lynch owned a shop that was described 'as the most interesting in London' by Time Out Magazine.

Lynch's first experience of electoral politics was when he contested the Limerick West constituency as an Independent in the 1969 Irish General Election.

Lynch was active in community politics in Finchley. He was also a founder member of The Archer, a community newspaper for the N2 area, and he founded the East Finchley Traders Association. He was on the Administrative Committee of the Finchley Society and spent six years as a voluntary adviser with the East Finchley Advice Centre. Before becoming a member of the London Assembly, he worked for the No-Euro campaign. In addition, he was the founder of an independent newspaper, London Green News.

Within the Green Party, Lynch founded the Green Party Trade Union Group and the London Internationals Group. He chaired the London-Irish Green Group and the London Green Party Animal Rights Group.

Lynch was fourth on the Green Party's list of candidates for the Top-Up (Additional Member System) seats at the 2000 London Assembly elections (11 seats elected by proportional representation). Three Green Party Assembly Members - Darren Johnson, Jenny Jones and Victor Anderson - were elected to Top-Up seats. In May 2003, Anderson resigned and was replaced by Lynch. In the 2004 London Assembly election, the Green vote share in the top-up seats election fell from 11.1% in 2000 to 8.37% in 2004, meaning that the party lost their third seat, held by Lynch, leaving Johnson and Jones as the remaining members of the London Assembly Green Group.

As an Assembly Member, Lynch was a member of the London Fire and Emergency Planning Authority (LFEPA), the Metropolitan Police Authority, the Culture, Sport and Tourism Committee, the Planning and Spatial Development Committee, the Health Committee and the Standards Committee (of which he was Chair). He focused on health issues, the homeless, GM crops, fluoride, the aged, disability issues and animal rights. He campaigned successfully to save Cricklewood Homeless Centre and improved the then fledgling Patients Forum of the London Ambulance Service. He organised conferences in City Hall on GM Crops and Non-animal Medical Research. He wrote four papers - Where Have All the Local Shops Gone?, Plastic not Fantastic (against plastic bag waste), Toilets Going to Waste (on the decline in public toilets) and Keep Off the Grass - the Loss of London's Playing Fields. In addition, he asked 157 formal questions to the Mayor on a wide range of issues.

In 2003, Lynch was the Green Party's candidate at the Brent East by-election, securing 3.1% of the vote (638 votes) and coming fourth. He was the party's parliamentary candidate for the Finchley and Golders Green constituency, where he came fourth with 1136 votes (2.6%) in the General Election of 2005.

Lynch was third on the Green Party's list of candidates for the Top-Up (Additional Member System) seats at the 2008 London Assembly elections, but the Green Party did not receive enough votes to elect a third Assembly member. He was again third on the Green Party list for the 2012 London Assembly election. He was fourth on the list for 2016.

A tribute to Lynch was published on the City Hall website upon his death.

== See also ==
- Green Party of England and Wales
- London Assembly
