= Victor C. Anderson =

American painter and illustrator

Victor C. Anderson (1882 — 1937) was an American painter and illustrator, primarily known for his rural life scenes and landscapes, whose works were featured in Life and other magazines of the early 20th Century, and who produced a wide range of illustrations for books as well as oil paintings.

== Life ==
Like his father, Frank Anderson, Victor was a well-known painter of the Hudson River School. Victor drew and painted from an early age, eventually entering the Pratt Institute in Brooklyn. His favorite subjects were scenes of homespun rural life and landscapes of the late 19th and early 20th Centuries, and were popular nationally. For many years, he lived and had his studio at 195 Battle Avenue, White Plains, New York, where he died in 1937. He exhibited in the National Academy.

His daughter, Joan Howe (1915 – 2005), was a well-known watercolor artist who lived and worked in both Albany, NY, and Marathon Bay, FL.
