= Leonie Cooper =

British Labour Co-op politician

Councillor Leonie Cooper AM
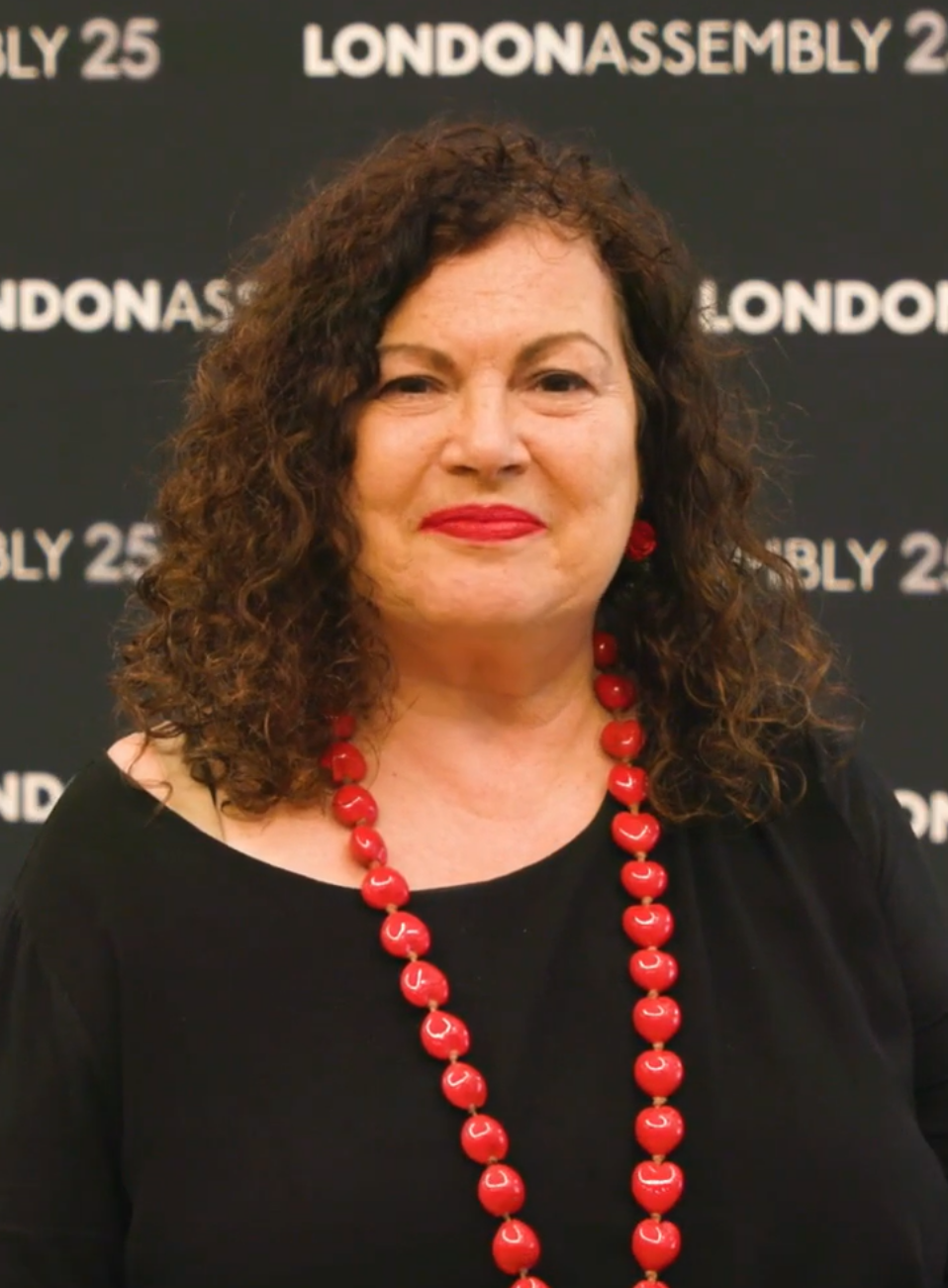
- Cooper in 2025

Member of the London Assembly for Merton and Wandsworth
- Incumbent
- Assumed office 7 May 2016
- Preceded by: Richard Tracey
- Majority: 27,423 (15.5%)

Wandsworth London Borough Councillor for Furzedown
- Incumbent
- Assumed office 6 May 2010

Wandsworth London Borough Councillor for Latchmere
- In office 4 May 2006 – 6 May 2010

Personal details
- Born: 27 December 1959 (age 66)
- Party: Labour Co-operative Party
- Education: University College London
- Profession: Politician

Leonie Alison Cooper (born 27 December 1959) is a British Labour & Co-operative Party politician. Since May 2016, she has represented Merton and Wandsworth on the London Assembly. She has served as a Councillor on the Wandsworth London Borough Council since 2006, representing Latchmere 2006–10 and Furzedown ward from 2010 onwards.

== Background ==
Before her election to the London Assembly, Cooper worked in the field of social housing, including as a Sustainability Manager for a large Housing group. Cooper is a vice-president of the Putney and Roehampton Branch of the United Nations Association, and chairs the Wandsworth Co-op Party. She is active as a member of the Friends of Tooting Common, which she helped set up, and served as a Governor of Eardley Primary School from 2010–17. A National Executive member since 2009, she previously served as a co-chair of the Socialist Environment and Resources Association (SERA), a socialist society affiliated to the Labour Party.

== Political career ==
In the 1992 general election, Cooper contested the constituency of Hornchurch, coming second to the Conservative incumbent, Robin Squire.

Cooper was first elected to Wandsworth Borough Council in 2006, as a Councillor for the Latchmere ward in Battersea. In 2010, she was elected as a Councillor for the Furzedown ward in Tooting, and re-elected in 2014. When Cooper was selected in 2009 for Furzedown, it was a marginal ward, with Conservative and Labour Councillors.

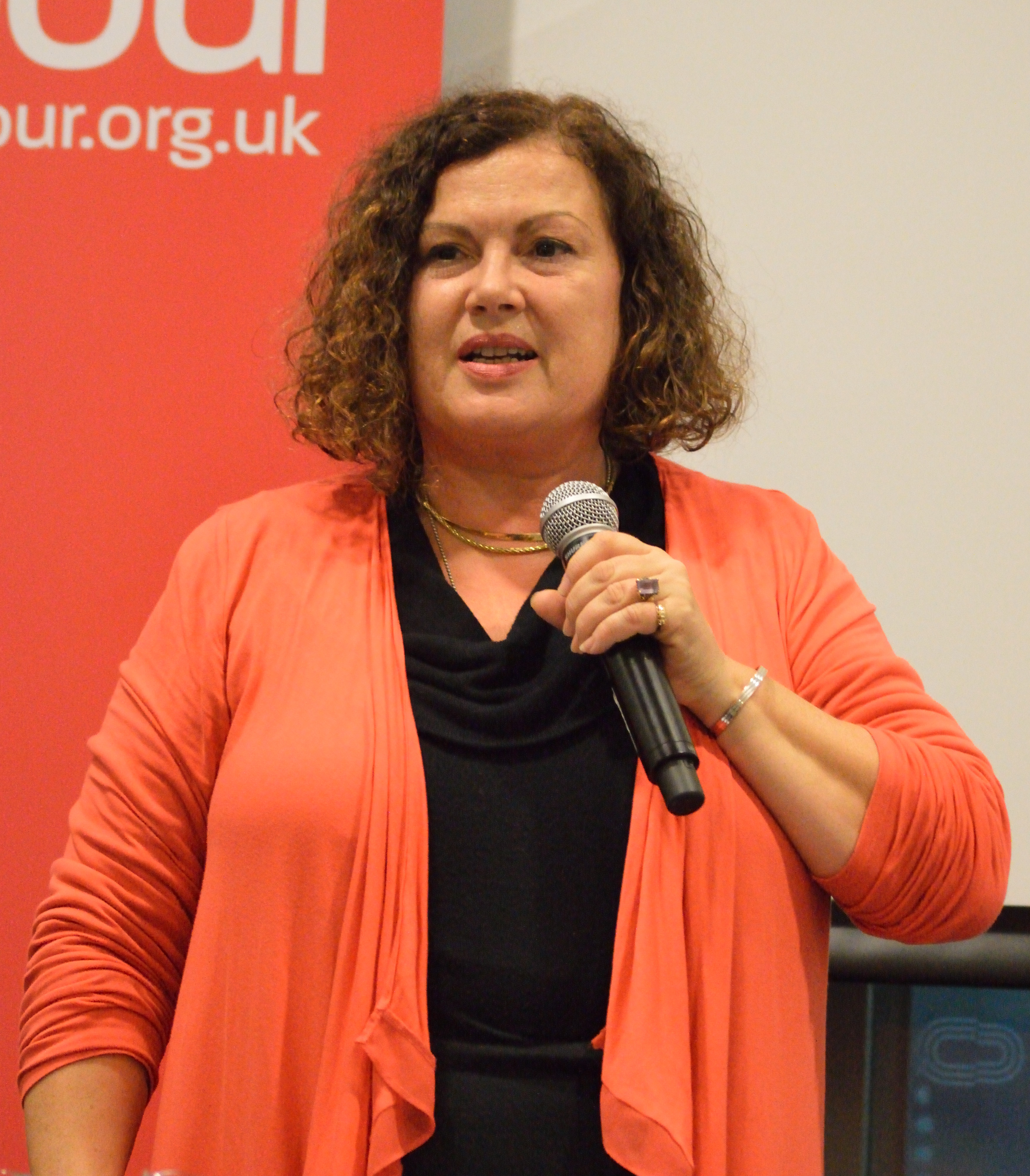
Cooper at Labour Party Conference in 2016

In 2008 and 2012, Cooper contested the Merton and Wandsworth Assembly seat, losing on both occasions to Richard Tracey, although achieving an increase in the Labour vote of 5.2% and 7.5% respectively. In May 2016, Cooper defeated the Conservative candidate to become the first Labour representative for Merton and Wandsworth since the establishment of the London Assembly. This was the only constituency Assembly seat to change hands in the May 2016 elections. Cooper was re-elected in May 2021, increasing her majority to 14,500.

In the 2024 London Assembly Election, Cooper was re-elected with 77,235 votes, a 27,423 majority over Ellie Cox, the Conservative Party candidate.

At the London Assembly Annual Meeting on 13 May 2016, Cooper was confirmed as the new Chair of the Assembly's Environment Committee 2016–18, and as a member of the Assembly's Housing Committee. Cooper was the first of the 2016 intake of Assembly Members to gain agreement for a single-member-led investigation, producing her report on "Biodiversity in the new housing developments" in January 2017. The Environment Committee has already produced a number of reports under her leadership, on single-use plastic bottles, on domestic energy and fuel poverty and on parks and open spaces. These were all submitted to the Mayor before the launch of the Mayor's draft Environment Strategy in August 2017, and many of their recommendations now feature in it. In addition, the Mayor's draft London Plan refers to both net biodiversity gain and an Urban Greening Factor, both recommendations from Cooper's report on "Biodiversity in new housing developments".

In June 2019, she launched a new report, 'Running Out or Flooded Out?', investigating the impact of water leaks, drought and flooding on London.

Cooper currently serves as Deputy Chair of the Environment Committee, as well as sitting on the Fire Committee, GLA Oversight Committee and Housing Committee. She is the London Assembly Labour Group's lead spokesperson on the environment.

She campaigns on the green skills needed for London's transition to Net Zero and fuel poverty, with her campaigning leading to the first ever Mayoral Fuel Poverty Strategy.
