= Jenny Jones, Baroness Jones of Moulsecoomb =

Green Party of England and Wales politician and life peer

The Right Honourable The Baroness Jones of Moulsecoomb FSA
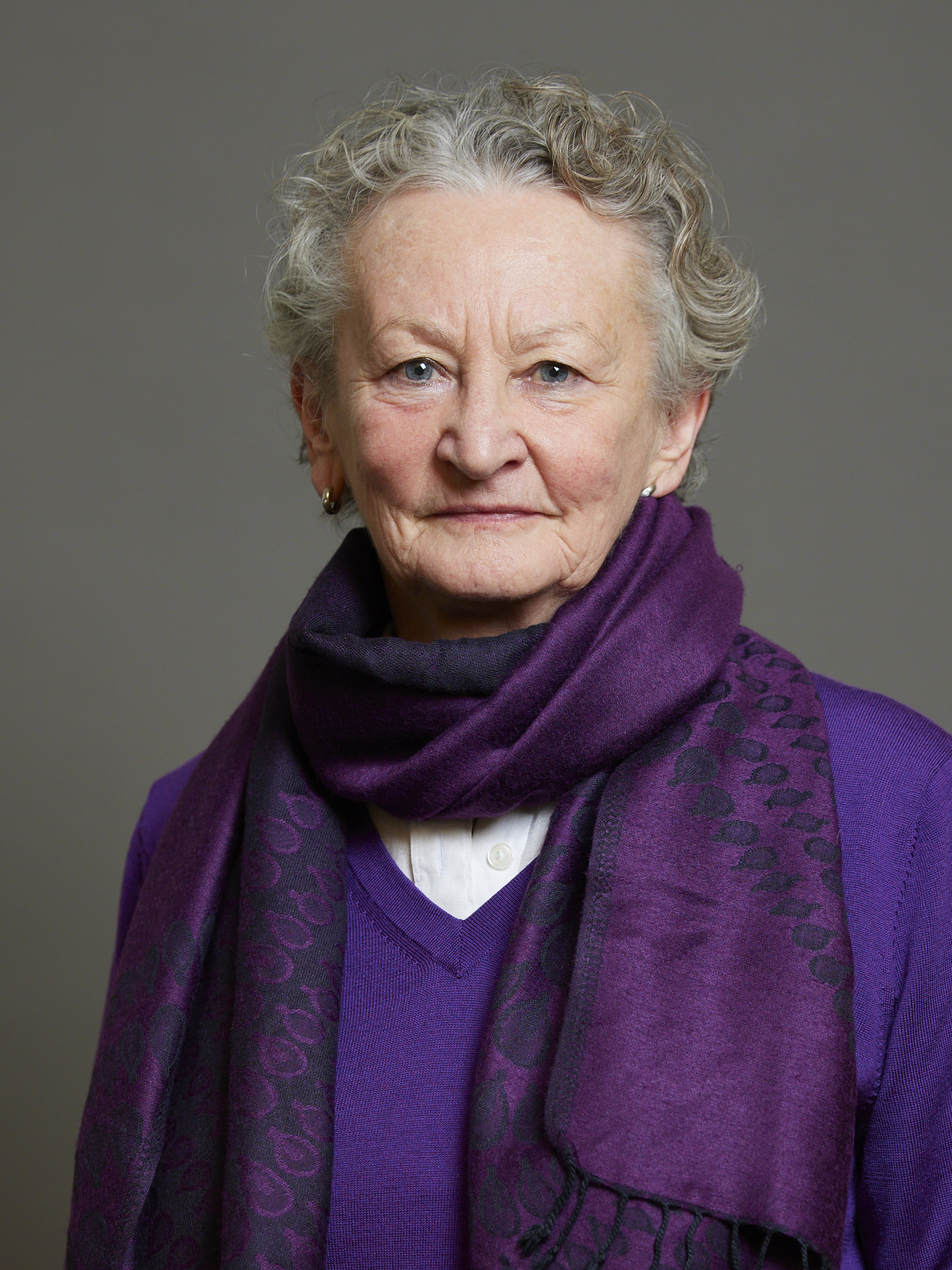
- Official portrait, 2022

Member of the House of Lords
- Lord Temporal
- Life peerage 20 September 2013

2nd Deputy Mayor of London
- In office 16 May 2003 – 14 June 2004
- Mayor: Ken Livingstone
- Preceded by: Nicky Gavron
- Succeeded by: Nicky Gavron

Member of the London Assembly as an additional member
- In office 4 May 2000 – 6 May 2016
- Succeeded by: Caroline Russell

Councillor for Southwark London Borough Council
- In office 4 May 2006 – 6 May 2010
- Ward: South Camberwell

Personal details
- Born: Jennifer Helen Jones; 23 December 1949 (age 76) Brighton, East Sussex, England
- Party: Green Party of England and Wales (1990–present)
- Other political affiliations: Green Party UK (1988–1990)
- Education: University College London (BSc)
- Website: jennyjones.org
- Jones' voice recorded February 2013

Jennifer Helen Jones, Baroness Jones of Moulsecoomb, FSA (born 23 December 1949) is a British politician who served as Deputy Mayor of London from 2003 to 2004. A member of the Green Party of England and Wales, she was until September 2019 the sole Green Party member in the House of Lords.

Jones represented the Green Party in the London Assembly from its creation in 2000 until standing down in 2016. She was the Green candidate for Mayor of London in the 2012 election, coming third with 4.48% of first preferences. She served as Deputy Mayor of London from May 2003 to June 2004. She was also the sole Green councillor on Southwark Council from 2006 to 2010.

On the London Assembly, Jones's prime areas of interest were transport, housing and planning, and policing, "with a strong emphasis on sustainability and localism". In addition to her period as deputy mayor, Jones was chair of London Food, Green Transport Advisor, and Road Safety Ambassador. It was announced in August 2013 that she was to become the first Green life peer in the House of Lords since Tim Beaumont. She was introduced to the House of Lords on 5 November 2013.

== Early life and career ==
Jones grew up on the Moulsecoomb estate in Brighton, As a child, she mucked out horse stables so she could get free horse rides. She attended the co-educational Westlain Grammar School (later Falmer High School and now BACA). Before entering politics, Jones worked as a financial controller in London. She studied environmental archaeology at the UCL Institute of Archaeology as a mature student, graduating with a Bachelor of Science (BSc) degree in 1991. She spent about 10 years in the Middle East, working on paleobotany, before embarking on a career in politics.

== Political career ==
Jones joined the Green Party (UK) in 1988, which splintered two years later into three parties, one of which is the Green Party of England and Wales. She has held several posts within the party, including the position of chair on the executive from 1995 to 1997.

=== London Assembly member ===
In the 2000 election, Jones won a place in the inaugural London Assembly as part of a three-strong Green group, alongside Darren Johnson and Victor Anderson (who resigned in March 2003 and was replaced by Noel Lynch for the remainder of the term). The 2004 elections saw the Greens lose the seat held by Lynch, leaving Jones and Johnson as the two remaining members of the group.

In May 2003, the Green Party, after some internal dissent, accepted an offer from the Mayor of London, Ken Livingstone, to nominate a deputy mayor; they chose Jones, who held the post until June 2004. The offer was part of Livingstone's pledge to rotate the position of deputy mayor, although he later declined to offer the post to the Conservatives and had an offer to the Liberal Democrats turned down.

As a London Assembly Member, Jones promoted the issues of road safety, food, sustainable transport, social justice and the police and civil liberties.

She was a member of the Metropolitan Police Authority, and in 2007 issued a report on traffic policing. She sat on both the MPA's Strategic and Operational Policing Committee and Civil Liberties Panel. Elsewhere she put forward a motion and put questions to the mayor calling for progress on women's issues, specifically in relation to violence against women and support provision.

Jones chaired the Planning and Housing Committee, which issued a report on food growing and planning in London, Cultivating the Capital. It concluded that "London has only three or four days stocks of food should there be any disruption to supply". Jones issued an individual report in January 2010 on affordable housing in London, which determined that "the cost of buying a home [in London] has risen twice as fast as incomes".

She was also a member of the Confirmation Hearings and Transport Committees.

She previously held roles as the Mayor's Road Safety Ambassador and Green Transport advisor, focusing on road safety and cycling in London respectively, as well as being the former Chair of London Food, a mayoral commission which "aims to give Londoners fresher, healthier and more affordable food while reducing the environmental impact of our current food supply". As Chair, Jones was responsible for drawing up the Sustainable Food Strategy for London and chaired the Food Implementation Group overseeing the strategy. In 2008, she issued a report on the subject of food security in the capital.

=== Southwark councillor ===
In the 2006 local elections, Jones was elected as a councillor for the South Camberwell ward in the London Borough of Southwark, the Greens' first councillor in Southwark. She came third in the ward, polling 1014 votes. In the 2010 elections she lost her seat, coming fifth with 1282 votes.

=== Parliamentary candidate ===
In the 2005 general election, Jones stood in the Dulwich and West Norwood constituency, coming fourth with 2,741 votes (6.5%).

In the 2010 general election, she stood in the Camberwell and Peckham constituency, coming fourth with 1,361 votes (2.9%).

=== Mayoral candidate ===
In March 2011, Jones was selected as the Green Party's candidate for the 2012 London mayoral election, winning 67% of the votes against prominent Green Party members Shahrar Ali and Farid Bakht. She stated: "At this time of savage cuts to essential services, London needs a Mayor who will create a fairer city and reduce the gap between rich and poor. These are hard times for people who care about quality services, local businesses, and protecting the most vulnerable members of our communities. I promise to make fighting cuts to housing benefit, the NHS and youth services a key part of my campaign to be Mayor."

At the election, she came third with 98,913 first preference votes (4.5%), but lost her deposit due to receiving less than 5% of the vote.

=== House of Lords ===
On 20 September 2013, Jones was created a life peer, taking the title Baroness Jones of Moulsecoomb, of Moulsecoomb in the County of East Sussex. She was nominated for this appointment by her party after a ballot of members. She was introduced to the House of Lords on 5 November 2013. She became the first Green Party peer since the death of Tim Beaumont, in 2008. Jones was joined in the House of Lords by Natalie Bennett, Baroness Bennett of Manor Castle, in October 2019.

== Political views ==
=== Climate and ecological crisis ===
On 17 November 2018, Jones joined the demonstration organised in London by Extinction Rebellion. She told The Guardian that "We are at the point where if we don’t start acting and acting fast we are just going to wipe out our life support system" and that "Basically, conventional politics has failed us – it’s even failed me and I’m part of the system – so people have no other choice".

=== The City ===
In her statement of policy for the 2012 election, Jones proposed several ideas to bring "a renaissance of micro, small and medium businesses" in order to spread "wealth to all Londoners", seeking "a financial services sector that works for them". She argues for a system that rewards good long-term investment "instead of trying to make a fast buck" and proposes a good financial example to be Sweden's Handelsbanken which gives "good basic pay and no bonuses." One of her candidacy's most distinct positions was with respect to The City with ambitions to "Abolish the City of London Corporation and replace it with a democratic London borough", "support new institutions like local community banks focused on lending to small businesses and social enterprises" and "Promote building societies and credit unions and lobby the Government to put its remaining nationalised banking assets into one of these models rather than a bank". Elsewhere, Jones has been critical of excessive top-level remuneration, stating in 2011, "It's difficult not to feel enraged" by statistics showing the average FTSE CEO earns 565 times the national average.

=== European Union and Brexit ===
Jones is a Eurosceptic and advocated the withdrawal of the United Kingdom from the European Union. She cited lack of democracy, waste and cost as her reasons for supporting Brexit. In October 2015, Jones gave her support to Vote Leave, an organisation campaigning to leave the European Union in the referendum in the UK. Jones cited the Transatlantic Trade and Investment Partnership and EU policies of austerity as part of a measure to deal with Greece's national debt imposed by the European troika as reasons to support Brexit. She also argued that "the EU exists on too large a scale for genuine democratic oversight and accountability. The Green party believes that small is beautiful – and the EU is gigantist in its very nature". However, on BBC Radio 4's Any Questions on 8 June 2022, Jones argued that Brexit had now been seen to be causing economic and other damage, and that people should keep an open mind about the possibility of rejoining the EU in the future if it becomes clear that it would be better going forward for the people of the UK to do so. She said in 2023 that "The only sensible thing now is to cut our losses and rejoin the EU".

=== Fair pay ratio ===
Jones and the Green Party, alongside others, are critical of the inequalities in the pay between rich and poor people. In 2011, she supported a call by the New Economics Foundation to introduce a 10:1 pay ratio, whereby the highest earner in a company or institution should earn no more than 10 times the lowest paid employee. In her 2012 mayoral campaign she said this would be instigated in "City Hall, Transport for London, the fire brigade and the police", saying "more equal societies tend to be happier and healthier as well as experiencing lower levels of violent crime."

=== Transgender issues ===
Jones says that she supports trans rights, but does not support self-identification of gender and, in March 2018, re-tweeted a statement that linked self-identification to cases of child abuse in Telford. In the same year, Jones said that her crowdfunder leaflets were defaced with "TERF" (meaning "trans-exclusionary radical feminist") at the Green Party conference.

At the 2021 conference, Jones spoke in favour of Motion E01, which argued that women were discriminated against "solely upon their biological sex". This motion was defeated, following criticism that the motion excluded trans women.

=== Healthy eating ===
Jones argued for big changes to London's food culture in her role as chair of London Food during Ken Livingstone's second mayoral term. In 2006, during her time as chair, London Food released its 'Food Strategy' aiming to "help improve food in London’s schools, hospitals and other public institutions" and "offer people on low income better access to healthy and affordable food".

In 2008, Jones released a report ‘Why London Needs to Grow More Food’ stressing "The Mayor of London has planning and development powers, which could be used to support widespread urban agriculture in London through the commercial and voluntary sectors, community-led social enterprises, and by engaging the unemployed, elderly, and lower skilled groups".

=== Housing ===
Jones sees tackling homelessness as a key and achievable target, and in 2012 criticised Johnson's poor record as mayor: "This rise in homelessness is unsurprising and depressing, but completely avoidable. One fifth of people became homeless just because their insecure tenancy ended, another fifth because they have had to move out of their parents’ home into the incredibly expensive rental market. With housing benefit cuts now biting deep into people's incomes, this is only going to get worse." Jones proposed to "bring all grants for pan-London homelessness services into the GLA to protect frontline services, and work closely with homelessness organisations to ensure nobody needs to spend a second night out sleeping rough on the street."

In her 2012 campaign for mayor, Jones spoke against the inflationary effects of certain businesses, stating, "we want to change the housing market from a playground for speculative investment to a source of secure, affordable homes". She spoke in favour of community engagement in planning, specifically with regards to housing co-operatives. To help co-operatives develop, she proposed to "establish the London Mutual Housing Company to help communities set-up Community Land Trusts, which will give them control over the design, development and management of permanently affordable homes." In addition she proposed a scheme to build affordable homes and to give communities the means to bring unused buildings back into use. For the Greens, fuel poverty is a big issue, and "Green London Assembly Members worked to secure the city's largest home insulation programme and demonstrated how it could be funded to reach over a million homes."

=== Male curfew proposal ===
On 11 March 2021, following the disappearance of Sarah Everard, Jones proposed that a 6pm curfew for men should be put in place. In her opinion this would help to make women feel safer and also reduce discrimination. Jones' proposals received criticism from the Conservative Party leader in the London Assembly, Susan Hall, and then former leader of Reform UK, Nigel Farage. Jones later said that the comment was "not an entirely serious suggestion as I don't have the power to do that" and reiterated that a ban on men leaving their house was not Green Party policy.

=== Police ===
Jones was a member of the Metropolitan Police Authority from its creation in 2000 "and has worked on a wide range of policing issues, with a particular focus on road safety, violence against women, civil liberties and neighbourhood policing" until it was disbanded in 2012. She was outspoken about numerous issues including what she called mayor Boris Johnson's demonisation of youth through the use of "baseless" rhetoric on "soaring gang-membership and rising knife-crime", suggesting the mayor created an unhelpful climate of fear. Jones then served as a member of the MPA's replacement body, the London Assembly Police and Crime Committee.

In response to the riots in August 2011, Jones and Green Party leader Caroline Lucas co-authored an article in The Guardian, arguing that all cuts to policing should be postponed until December 2012 when a sufficient review of the events has occurred and the lessons from the London Olympics are learned, "In the meantime, the police should focus on spending money wisely, and ensuring that police officers are not burdened with administrative tasks which take them away from frontline policing."

After herself being kettled at a 2011 student demonstration, Jones was vociferously critical of this police tactic, telling the BBC the police used kettling to "imprison peaceful campaigners and have shown they can't be trusted with such a powerful tactic", suggesting "The Met's reputation sinks even further every time they abuse their powers and it's time to stop this particular mistreatment".

In June 2014, Jones wrote an editorial in The Guardian wherein she criticised the surveillance tactics of police on activists. After going through the process available through the Data Protection Act to get the police report on herself, she found that she was labelled a potential "domestic extremist". She found that the report contained only publicly available information, such as tweets, and that nothing in it would suggest potentially dangerous activity. Jones had been under surveillance by the police's "domestic extremism" unit from 2001 until 2012, including the time during her campaign to become London's mayor. She viewed the revelation as both a violation of her privacy and a waste of police resources. and called for a re-evaluation of police policies, especially in regards to political activists.

In January 2016, whistleblower and police sergeant David Williams said that the police's "domestic extremism" unit shredded records "related to" Jones in June 2014, the month Jones met with the unit pressing for answers.

=== Transport ===
Jones commissioned the 2011 Transport for London report into promoting cycling, that paved the way for the London cycle-hire scheme. Ashok Sinha, chief executive of the London Cycling Campaign, said of Jones "In 2008 the London Cycling Campaign gave Jenny Jones a Special Award for her Lifetime Services to cycling. This was in recognition of her success in helping to push cycling into mainstream politics, her efforts to deliver many cycling projects on the ground, and her energies as cycling champion in general."

Jones spoke against Boris Johnson's transport policy of "making motoring cheaper in London, whilst public transport fares are raised above inflation". At mayor's question time in 2012, Jones highlighted a promise Johnson had made in 2008 to make all new buses hybrid by 2012 when in reality less than 10% had met this criterion. Jones argued for a reduction in the burden for Londoners from Johnson's price increases and proposed a reduction in fares of about 4%. She supported the congestion charge as a way to lower pollution and road casualties, and spoke against the mayor's cancellation of the western extension, arguing that it made London dirtier, more crowded and less safe. Her 2012 manifesto called for replacing the congestion charge with a "smart, pay-as-you drive scheme". Jones has also called for more people to use public transport and to reduce "non-essential" journeys, but in 2014 was criticised for frequently taking taxi journeys on expenses. In 2020, Jones opposed High Speed 2 and said that its budget should be spent on local transport.

=== Zionism ===
Jones has opposed the "Zionism is racism" motion, calling it "rather a big blip" for the Green Party.

Party political offices
Preceded by John Morrissey	Chair of the Green Party of England and Wales; 1996 – 1998	Succeeded by Alan Francis
Political offices
Preceded by Nicky Gavron	Deputy Mayor of London; 2003–2004	Succeeded by Nicky Gavron
