= Kris Stewart =

English football executive (born 1967)

Kris Stewart (born February 9, 1967, in Portsmouth) is the founding chairman of English football club AFC Wimbledon and a left wing political activist. He was the club's chief executive and is also a CIMA past finalist management accountant. Under his leadership, AFC Wimbledon achieved numerous milestones including their first ever match, a friendly against Sutton United, as well as their first competitive game in the Combined Counties League away at Sandhurst, and a sell-out game against Chipstead at Kingsmeadow. He is a former member of the Socialist Workers Party (SWP) and stood as the Left List's candidate for Merton and Wandsworth in the 2008 London Assembly election.

In 2013, he resigned from the SWP due to the party's rape scandal and co-founded the International Socialist Network with around 100 other former members.
