= Elizabeth Howlett =

British politician

Member of the London Assembly for Merton and Wandsworth
- In office 4 May 2000 – 1 May 2008
- Preceded by: New constituency
- Succeeded by: Richard Tracey

Personal details
- Party: Conservative

Elizabeth Howlett (born November 1938) is a Conservative Party politician and former member of the London Assembly for Merton and Wandsworth.

== Political career ==
Howlett was elected to the London Assembly on 4 May 2000 and re-elected on 10 June 2004. She served until May 2008. Her positions included:

- Deputy Chair of the Health and Public Services Committee
- Member of the Standards Committee
- Member of the Transport Committee
- Member of the Metropolitan Police Authority
- Conservative Group's spokesman on health

Howlett, was Wandsworth councillor since 1986 in the London Borough of Wandsworth, where she is a former Mayor 1998/9 and former Chairman of the Social Services and Education Committees. She is a member of the London Regional Arts Council.

== Biography ==
Elizabeth Howlett, was born in Dundee Scotland trained as a soprano at the Royal Scottish Academy of Music and Drama (RSAMD) in Glasgow on a scholarship. She later moved to Glyndebourne in East Sussex then joined Saddlers Wells in 1961. She was an international opera singer and performed at Covent Garden, the continent and with the Scottish Opera. She was a member of the Hamburg State Opera for several seasons. in the 1980s she appeared on the Stuart Burrows Sings (1981-1986) television series. At the time of her election to the London Assembly she was a professor at the Royal College of Music. Sopranos who studied with her include Sandy Leung, Natalie Clifton-Griffith and Julie Bale. In 1997 baritone Grant Doyle won a scholarship to study with her. She has appeared on a small number of recordings including:

- 1962 Gilbert and Sullivan – Sadler's Wells Opera Company – Highlights from Iolanthe, His Master's Voice
- 1966 Purcell – Victoria De Los Angeles, Heather Harper, Patricia Johnson (3), Peter Glossop, Raymond Leppard (Harpsichord), Ambrosian Singers, English Chamber Orchestra, Sir John Barbirolli – Dido And Aeneas – Angel Records
- 1969 Georg Solti – London Records
- 1993 Gilbert & Sullivan – Sadler's Wells Orchestra, Chorus – Alexander Faris – Gilbert And Sullivan: The Mikado (Complete) And Iolanthe (Highlights) – EMI
- 1995 Purcell : Dido and Aeneas
- 2003 Gilbert & Sullivan – Alexander Faris – Gilbert And Sullivan: The Mikado (Complete) And Iolanthe (Highlights)
- 2003 Bizet – Carmen (Highlights) – EM I
- 2012 Solti : The Legacy 1937-1997
