= Victor Anderson (British politician) =

British politician (born 1952)

Member of the London Assembly as an additional member
- In office 4 May 2000 – 30 March 2003
- Preceded by: New constituency
- Succeeded by: Noel Lynch

Personal details
- Party: Green Party

Victor Anderson is a former London Assembly member, serving from 4 May 2000 to March 2003.

He worked as a researcher for Plaid Cymru-Green Party MP Cynog Dafis, as part of the deal that brought Dafis the Green Party's support on condition of Anderson's employment and led to Dafis being the first Green MP in the UK.

He worked for former Labour and Co-operative Party MP Lloyd Russell-Moyle before his defection to the Green Party in the 2019-2024 parliament.

He is also a published academic, writing for the New Economics Foundation. He is a supporter of the Green Economics Institute.

== Bibliography ==
- Alternative economic indicators : Victor Anderson. Routledge, London, 1991. 106 pp. ISBN 0-415-04164-3
