= 2015 in United Kingdom politics and government =

== January ==
- 3 January – St Helens North MP David Watts announces his retirement at the 2015 election.
- 12 January – Faversham and Mid Kent MP Andy Love announces his retirement at the 2015 election.
- 14 January – Edmonton MP Hugh Robertson announces his retirement at the 2015 election.
- 23 January – Fareham MP Mark Hoban announces his retirement at the 2015 election.
- 24 January – Midlothian MP David Hamilton announces his retirement at the 2015 election.
- 30 January – Torfaen MP Paul Murphy announces his retirement at the 2015 election.
- 31 January – Stephen Dorrell says health reform is the governments biggest failure.

== February ==
- 1 February – Horsham MP Francis Maude announces his retirement at the 2015 election.
- 12 February – Halifax MP Linda Riordan announces her retirement at the 2015 election.
- 22 February – Jack Straw loses the Labour whip.
- 23 February – Malcolm Rifkind loses the Conservative whip.
- 24 February – Kensington MP Malcolm Rifkind announces his retirement at the 2015 election.

== March ==
- 9 March – Eddisbury MP Stephen O'Brien announces his retirement at the 2015 election.
- 18 March – The March 2015 United Kingdom budget is given by George Osborne.

== April ==
- 3 April – Dundee West MP Jim McGovern announces his retirement at the 2015 election.
- 22 April – 2015 Anguillian general election.

== May ==
- 3 May – The EdStone is unveiled in a car park in Hastings and Rye.
- 7 May –
  - 2015 United Kingdom general election
  - 2015 United Kingdom local elections
- 8 May –
  - Nick Clegg resigns as Leader of the Liberal Democrats.
  - Nigel Farage resigns as Leader of UKIP.
  - Ed Miliband resigns as Leader of the Labour Party.
- 10 May –
  - Liz Kendall announces her candidacy for labour leader.
  - Tom Watson announces his candidacy for the 2015 Labour Party deputy leadership election
- 13 May –
  - Sadiq Khan launches his campaign for Mayor of London.
  - Diane Abbott launches her campaign for Mayor of London.
  - Yvette Cooper announces her candidacy for labour leader.
  - Andy Burnham launches his campaign for labour leader.
- 15 May –
  - Gareth Thomas launches his campaign for Mayor of London.
  - Ben Bradshaw announces his candidacy for the 2015 Labour Party deputy leadership election.
- 16 May –
  - Jim Murphy resigns as leader of Scottish Labour.
  - Stella Creasy announces her candidacy for the 2015 Labour Party deputy leadership election.
  - Caroline Flint announces her candidacy for the 2015 Labour Party deputy leadership election.
- 17 May – Keir Starmer rules himself out of the Labour leadership contest.
- 18 May – Angela Eagle announces her candidacy for the 2015 Labour Party deputy leadership election.
- 19 May – Tessa Jowell launches her campaign for Mayor of London.
- 20 May – Simon Danczuk rules himself out from the 2015 Labour Party deputy leadership election.

== June ==
- 3 June – Jeremy Corbyn launches his campaign for labour leader.
- 8 June – 2015 British Virgin Islands general election
- 11 June – John Healey withdraws from the 2015 Labour Party deputy leadership election.
- 13 June – London Labour announce a shortlist of six candidates for mayor.
- 17 June – Rushanara Ali withdraws from the 2015 Labour Party deputy leadership election.

== July ==
- 8 July – The July 2015 United Kingdom budget is given by George Osborne.
- 16 July – 2015 Liberal Democrats leadership election ends with Tim Farron beating Norman Lamb.
- 22 July – The Constitutional Convention Bill is introduced in the House of Commons by Graham Allen MP.
- 27 July – The 2015 British National Party leadership election ends with Adam Walker being elected leader.

== August ==
- 4 August – Former prime minister Sir Edward Heath, who died in 2005, is investigated by police forces as part of their inquiries into allegations of historical child abuse.

== September ==
- 10 September – Sadiq Khan wins the 2015 London Labour Party mayoral selection.
- 12 September – 2015 Labour Party leadership election, 2015 Labour Party deputy leadership election
- 22 September – The list of the 2015 Dissolution Honours is gazetted.

== October ==
- 2 October – Zac Goldsmith wins the 2015 London Conservative Party mayoral selection.
- 21 October – Labour MP Michael Meacher dies in office.

== November ==
- 15 November Colum Eastwood is elected in the 2015 Social Democratic and Labour Party leadership election.

== December ==
- 3 December – The 2015 Oldham West and Royton by-election is won by Jim McMahon.

== Deaths ==
- 21 January –
  - Leon Brittan, 75, politician, Home Secretary (1983–85).
  - Frank Hooley, 91, politician, MP for Sheffield Heeley (1966–1970, 1974–1983).
- 1 February –
  - Gordon Murray, 87, politician.
  - Beryl Platt, Baroness Platt of Writtle, 91, engineer and politician.
- 10 February – Sir William Lawrence, 5th Baronet, 60, peer.
- 21 February – Christopher Price, 83, politician, MP for Birmingham Perry Barr (1966–1970) and Lewisham West (1974–1983).
- 3 March – Denis Coe, 86, politician, MP for Middleton and Prestwich (1966–1970).
- 12 March – Sir Jerry Wiggin, 78, politician, MP for Weston-super-Mare (1969–1997).
- 21 March –
  - Sir Hal Miller, 86, politician, Member of Parliament (1974–1992).
  - Sir James Spicer, 89, politician, MP for West Dorset (1974–1997).
- 1 June – Charles Kennedy, 55, politician.

== See also ==
- 2015 in the United Kingdom
