= 2016 West Midlands Labour Party mayoral selection =

West Midlands Labour Party mayoral selection 2016
May – August 2016
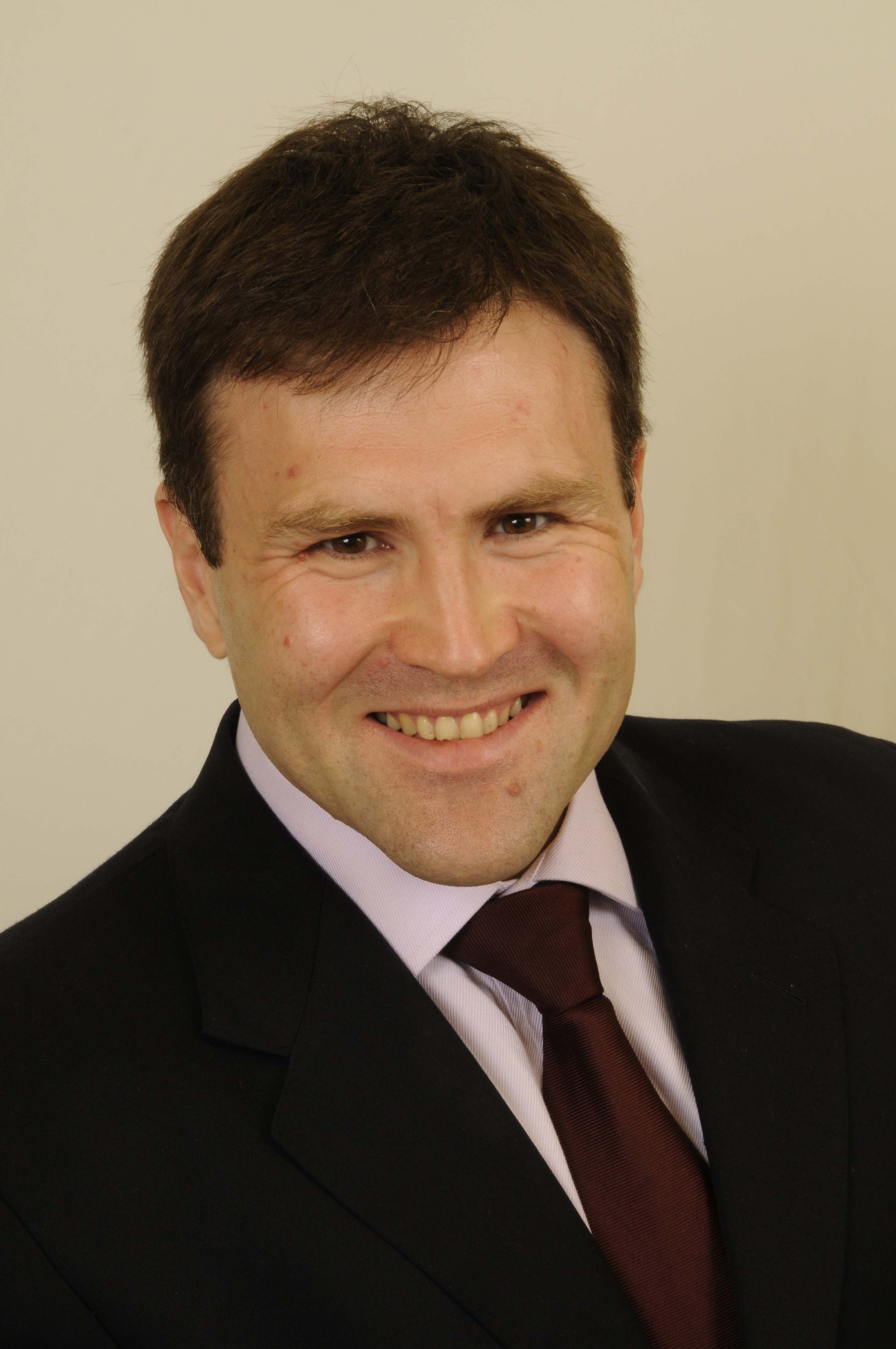
Candidate	Siôn Simon	Steve Bedser
First preferences	71.21%	28.79%
Elected Mayoral candidate
Siôn Simon
Labour

The West Midlands Labour Party mayoral selection of 2016 was the process by which the Labour Party selected its candidate for Mayor of the West Midlands, to stand in the mayoral election on 4 May 2017.

The selection took place amid the backdrop of the 2016 Labour Leadership election, with Simon being a close friend and ally of Tom Watson, the Deputy Leader of the Labour Party, who had been calling for incumbent Labour Leader Jeremy Corbyn to step down. Steve Bedser pitched to Corbyn supporters, expressing his support for Corbyn, whilst simultaneously stating that Corbyn needed to improve his performance. On 10 August 2016, Simon was announced as the winning candidate.

== Candidates ==
Name	Born	Current/previous positions	Announced candidacy	Campaign website (Slogan)
Siôn Simon	23 December 1968 (age 56)	Member of the European Parliament for West Midlands (2014–present); Parliamentary Under-Secretary for Creative Industries (2009–10); Parliamentary Under-Secretary for Further Education (2008–09); Member of Parliament for Birmingham Erdington (2001–10)	May 2016	sion-simon.com #Team Siôn (Uniting the West Midlands)
Steve Bedser	August 1965 (age 59)	Businessman Birmingham Council Cabinet member for Health and Well Being (−2014); Birmingham Councillor for Kings Norton (2012–2014)	June 2016	

=== Not selected ===
- Najma Hafeez, management consultant, former Birmingham City Councillor and former Chairwoman of City Hospital
- Milkinder Jaspal, Wolverhampton City Councillor
- Mary Simons-Jones, freelance book-seller

=== Declined ===
- Ian Austin, MP for Dudley North since 2005, and former Parliamentary Private Secretary to the Prime Minister under Gordon Brown.
- Liam Byrne, MP for Birmingham Hodge Hill, and former Chief Secretary to the Treasury under Gordon Brown.
- Darren Cooper, former leader of Sandwell Metropolitan Borough Council, was perceived as a potential candidate before his sudden death in March 2016.
- Gisela Stuart, MP for Birmingham Edgbaston, Chair of Vote Leave and former Parliamentary Under-Secretary of State for Health.

== Membership ballot ==
The results of the selection were announced on 10 August 2016. A total of 3,817 valid votes were cast.

First round
Candidate	Votes	Percentage
Siôn Simon	2,718	71.21%
Steve Bedser	1,099	28.79%

== See also ==
- Greater Manchester Labour Party mayoral selection, 2016
- Liverpool City Region Labour Party mayoral selection, 2016
- London Labour Party mayoral selection, 2015
