= 2002 London Labour Party mayoral selection =

London Labour Party mayoral selection 2002
- 6 November 2002

Candidate	Nicky Gavron	Tony Banks	Bob Shannon
First Round	47.3%	39.8%	12.9%
Second Round	54.0%	46.0%	Eliminated
Elected Mayoral candidate
Nicky Gavron
Labour

The London Labour Party mayoral selection of 2002 was the process by which the Labour Party selected its candidate for Mayor of London, to stand in the 2004 mayoral election. Nicky Gavron, Deputy Mayor of London and London Assembly member for Enfield and Haringey, was selected to stand.

In the event, Gavron did not contest the Mayoral election - in 2004 she stood aside as the Labour candidate and incumbent Mayor Ken Livingstone was nominated as the new candidate following his readmission to the Labour Party. Livingstone went on to win re-election, appointing Gavron his Deputy.

== Selection process ==
The Labour Party candidate for Mayor was elected by an electoral college composed half-and-half of the votes of Labour members in London and the votes of affiliated organisations.

== Candidates ==
- Nicky Gavron, Deputy Mayor of London and London Assembly member for Enfield and Haringey.
- Tony Banks, Minister for Sport 1997–1999; Member of Parliament for West Ham.
- Bob Shannon, former Leader of Harrow Council.

== Result ==
=== First round ===
Candidate	Individual members (50.0%)	Affiliated members (50.0%)	Overall Result
Nicky Gavron	46.2%	48.4%	47.3%
Tony Banks	45.7%	33.5%	39.8%
Bob Shannon	8.1%	18.0%	12.9%

=== Second round ===
Candidate	Individual members (50.0%)	Affiliated members (50.0%)	Overall Result
Nicky Gavron ✓	50.4%	57.7%	54.0%
Tony Banks	49.6%	42.3%	46.0%

Source: Unfortunately, this service is no longer available | University of Essex

== See also ==
- 2004 London Labour Party mayoral selection
- 2004 London mayoral election
