= 2016 Liverpool City Region Labour Party mayoral selection =

Liverpool City Region Labour Party (UK) mayoral selection 2016
- May – August 2016
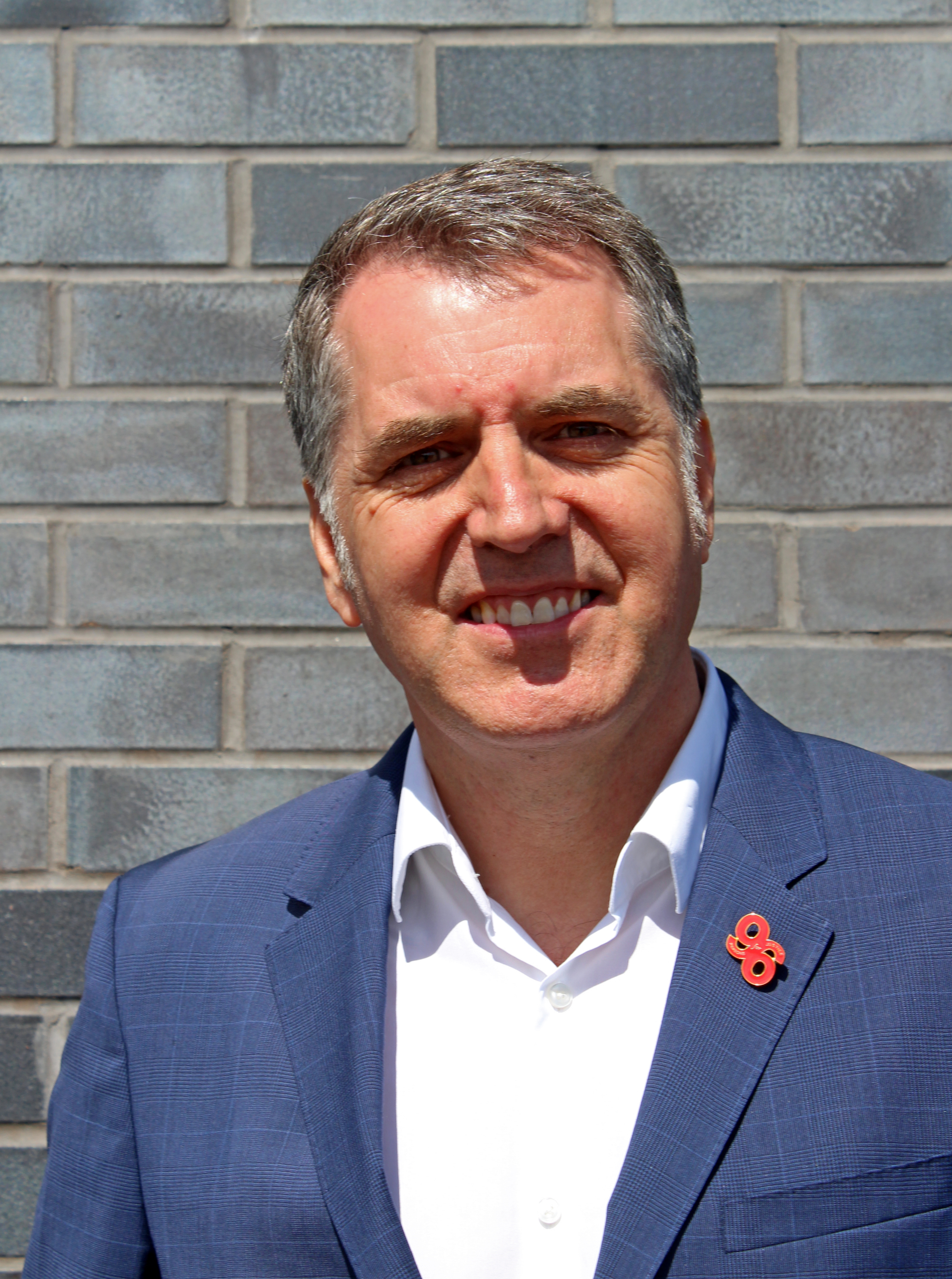

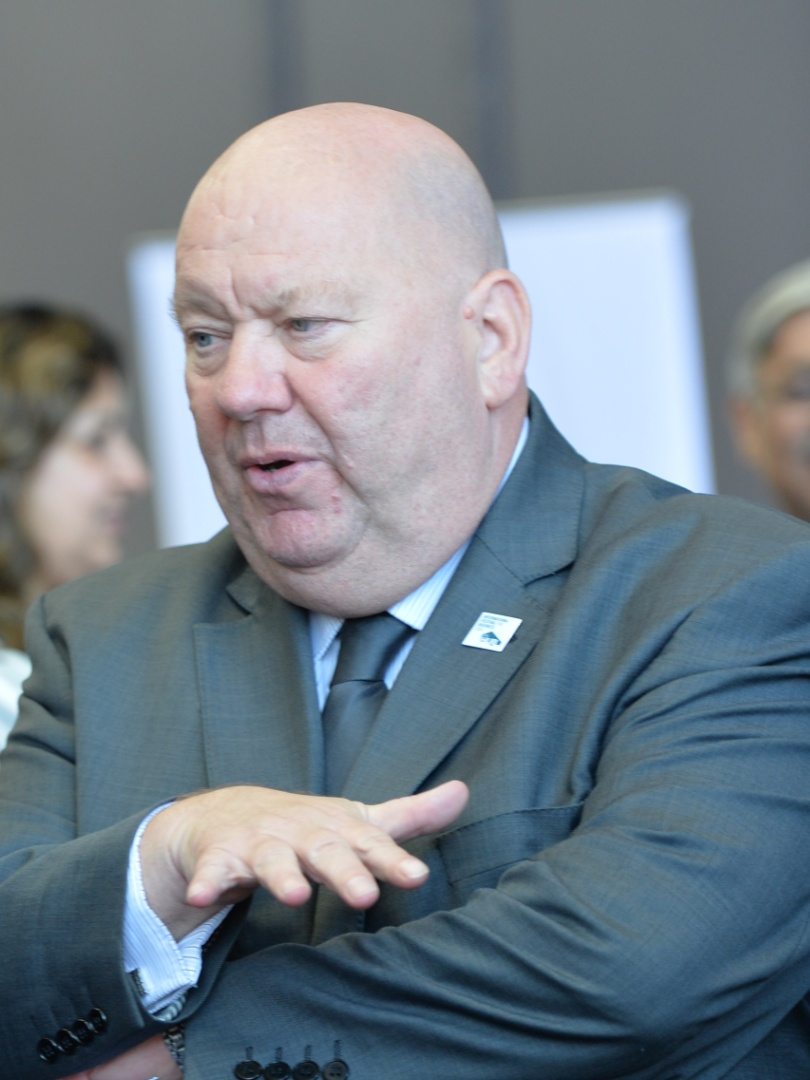

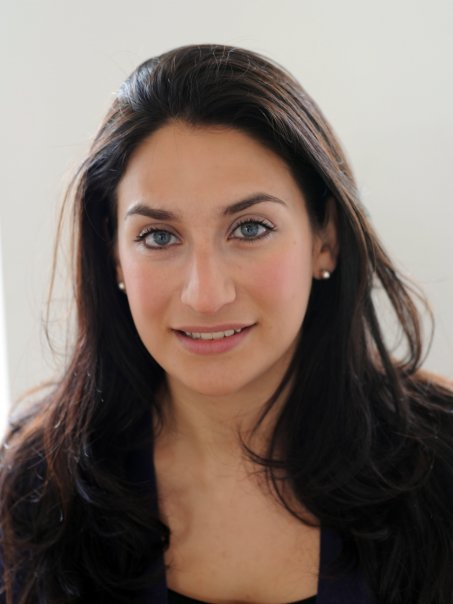
| Candidate | Steve Rotheram | Joe Anderson | Luciana Berger |
| 1st Pref. | 2,029 | 1,641 | 1,202 |
| Percentage | 40.9% | 33.1% | 24.2% |
| Final Pref. | 2,670 | 2,042 | Eliminated |
| Percentage | 59.8% | 41.2% | Eliminated |
Mayoral candidate before election
Joe Anderson (interim)
Labour
Elected Mayoral candidate
Steve Rotheram
Labour

The Liverpool City Region Labour Party mayoral selection of 2016 was the process by which the Labour Party selected its candidate for Mayor of the Liverpool City Region, to stand in the mayoral election on 4 May 2017.

Voting ending on Friday 5 August 2016, with the result to be announced on Wednesday 10 August. Steve Rotheram had called for the voting deadline to be extended until Friday 12 August after delays in issuing ballot papers, but in the event, on 10 August Rotheram was declared the winning candidate.

== Candidates ==
| Name | Born | Current/previous positions | Announced candidacy | Campaign website (Slogan) |
|---|---|---|---|---|
| Steve Rotheram | 4 November 1961 (age 64) | Parliamentary Private Secretary to the Leader of Her Majesty's Opposition (2015–2017); MP for Liverpool Walton (2010–2017) | 22 May 2016 | Steve 4 Metro Mayor ("No Borough Left Behind - Fighting for the whole of Liverpool City Region") |
| Joe Anderson | 24 January 1958 (age 68) | Chair of the Liverpool City Region Combined Authority (2015–2017); Mayor of Liverpool (2012–2021); Leader of Liverpool City Council (2010–2012) | 27 May 2016 | Joe for Liverpool ("A Track Record of Delivery - A Promise of More") |
| Luciana Berger | 13 May 1981 (age 45) | Shadow Minister for Mental Health (2015–2016); Shadow Minister for Public Health (2013–2015); MP for Liverpool Wavertree (2010–2019) | 31 May 2016 | Luciana For Mayor ("Let's Choose the Future") |

=== Declined ===
- Barrie Grunewald, Leader of St Helens Council, had been seen as a potential contender. Grunewald later endorsed Rotheram.

== Endorsements ==
Joe Anderson

- Louise Ellman, MP for Liverpool Riverside (1997–present)
- Stephen Twigg, MP for Liverpool West Derby (2010–present), Enfield Southgate (1997–2005)
- Peter Dowd, MP for Bootle (2015–present)
- Phil Davies, Leader of Wirral Council
- Andy Moorhead, Leader of Knowsley Council
- Phil Redmond, English television producer and screenwriter

Steve Rotheram

- Bill Esterson, MP for Sefton Central (2010–present)
- Barrie Grunewald, Leader of St Helens Council
- Sue Johnston, English actor.
- Peter Kilfoyle, MP for Liverpool Walton (1991–2010)

== Membership ballot ==
The results of the selection were announced on 10 August 2016. Turnout was 72%, with 4,955 votes cast, and 83 invalid votes.

First round
| Candidate | Votes | Percentage |
|---|---|---|
| Steve Rotheram | 2,029 | 40.9% |
| Joe Anderson | 1,641 | 33.1% |
| Luciana Berger ✗ | 1,202 | 24.2% |
Second round
| Steve Rotheram ✓ | 2,670 | 59.8% |
| Joe Anderson ✗ | 2,042 | 41.2% |

== See also ==
- Greater Manchester Labour Party mayoral selection, 2016
- London Labour Party mayoral selection, 2015
