= 2019 British National Party leadership election =

2019 BNP leadership election

- 4 July 2019 – 29 July 2019
Candidate	Adam Walker	David Furness	Spoiled ballots
Popular vote	308	161	7
Percentage	64.71%	33.82%	1.47%
Leader before election
Adam Walker
Elected Leader
Adam Walker

The British National Party (BNP) leadership election of 2019 took place in July 2019 to elect the leader of the BNP. Four years had passed since the previous election in 2015, and the party constitution required a leadership election to be held quadrennially. Incumbent BNP leader Adam Walker was first elected in 2015 after previously serving as Acting Leader and Deputy Leader, and he stood for re-election. His sole opponent was BNP press officer, national spokesman, and London mayoral candidate David Furness. He announced his leadership campaign on his YouTube channel and received endorsements from several notable party members.

Walker was re-elected by a margin of 147 votes, and a margin of victory of 30.88%. The runner-up David Furness received 161 votes, or 33.82% of the total vote. There were 7 spoiled ballots (equal to 1.47% of the vote). Turnout was 40% of eligible voters, an increase from 2015, although the total turnout had decreased. The returning officer David O’Loughlin announced the results at an unnamed venue in North West London on Monday 29th July 2019, starting at 2pm and concluding later that day. The results were added onto the BNP website on July 31. Furness' name has since been removed across the BNP website, and he later joined the British Democratic Party.

== Candidates ==
All candidates were required to produce a 500 word write up and a 5-minute video election address, both to be published on the BNP website. They were also required to attend a series of husting events for voting members in order to appear on the ballot. Two candidates were confirmed:

- Adam Walker, BNP leader since 2015, previously served as Acting Leader and Deputy Leader
- David Furness, BNP press officer, national spokesman, and 2016 London mayoral candidate

== Results ==
The share of the vote was split 33.82% to Furness and 64.71% to Walker. There were 7 spoiled ballot papers.

British National Party leadership election, 2019
Candidate	Votes	%
Adam Walker	308	64.71%
David Furness	161	33.82%
Spoiled ballots	7	1.47%

== Future ==
During Walker's second term as chairman, the BNP has experienced a collapse in its membership, as a large number of nationalist activists once affiliated with the party have begun coalescing around the British Democrats. The BNP has also been essentially inactive since 2019, and have not put forward a single candidate in any elections since 2019, with the only evidence of any activity whatsoever being the occasional post on its website or Twitter account. The primary source of the party's income has come in the form of money from wills left by ex-supporters. Although the party constitution required for a leadership election to occur in July 2023, no candidates appeared to have stood forward, or at least none reached the eight endorsements required from voting members in order to launch a candidacy, so Walker was presumably re-elected by default.
