= 2004 London Labour Party mayoral selection =

London Labour Party mayoral selection 2004
- 2 February 2004
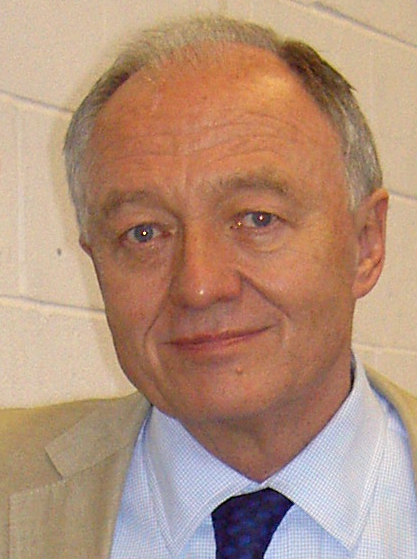
Candidate	Ken Livingstone
Party	Labour
Overall result	93.9%
Party members	87.7%
Affiliates	100.0%
Mayoral candidate before election
Nicky Gavron
Labour
Elected Mayoral candidate
Ken Livingstone
Labour

The London Labour Party mayoral selection of 2004 was the process by which the Labour Party selected its candidate for Mayor of London, to stand in the 2004 mayoral election. Ken Livingstone, the incumbent Mayor of London, was selected to stand after Labour's previous candidate, Nicky Gavron, stood aside.

== Background ==
Ken Livingstone had been elected Mayor of London in the 2000 election as an independent, after unsuccessfully seeking the Labour Party nomination. This resulted in his expulsion from the Labour Party. In 2002, Labour selected Nicky Gavron as its Mayoral candidate for the 2004 election. Livingstone had made public his intention to seek a second term as Mayor, leading to fears that the Labour vote could be split once again between Livingstone and Gavron.

However, in 2004, Livingstone was readmitted to the Labour Party, after passing a "loyalty test" interview with senior Labour Party officials. Gavron announced she would step aside, leaving a vacancy for Labour's Mayoral candidate.

== Candidates ==
- Ken Livingstone, Mayor of London; Leader of the Greater London Council 1981–1986; Member of Parliament for Brent East 1987–2001

== Process ==
London Labour Party members and affiliates were balloted on whether Livingstone should be nominated as Labour's Mayoral candidate; they were given the option to answer 'yes' or 'no' to whether they wanted Livingstone as the candidate. Affiliates and members had 50% of the votes each in an Electoral college.

== Result ==
Option	Individual members (50.0%)	Affiliated members (50.0%)	Overall Result
Yes	87.7%	100.0%	93.9%
No	12.3%	0.0%	6.1%

== See also ==
- 2004 London mayoral election
