= 2015 British National Party leadership election =

- 8 July 2015 – 27 July 2015
Candidate	Adam Walker	Paul Hilliard	Spoiled ballots
Popular vote	523	145	15
Percentage	76.58%	21.23%	2.19%
Leader before election
Adam Walker (acting; previously Nick Griffin)
Elected Leader
Adam Walker

The British National Party (BNP) leadership election of 2015 was triggered on 19 July 2014 when Nick Griffin stepped down as BNP leader to instead become the organisation's president (he was later expelled from the party and therefore the presidency in October 2014), but was not announced until 29 June 2015. Two candidates stood in the leadership election: Adam Walker (Acting BNP leader since 2014, and previously Deputy Leader of the BNP) and Paul Hilliard (BNP Derbyshire Sub Regional Organiser). On 27 July 2015, the results of the leadership election were announced, with Walker being named the winner by a margin of 378 votes, which translated to a 55.35% margin of victory. Walker had secured 543 votes compared to the 145 votes for Hilliard and the 15 spoiled ballot papers (which equaled 2.19%).

== Candidates ==
All candidates required a 150 word write up along with a photograph of the candidate for the postal election address, a further 500 word write up for publication on the BNP website, a 5-minute video election address for publication on the Party website, and were required to attend a series of husting events for voting members in order to appear on the ballot. Two candidates were confirmed:

- Adam Walker, Acting BNP leader since 2014 and previously Deputy Leader of the BNP
- Paul Hilliard, BNP Derbyshire Sub Regional Organiser

== Campaign ==
Hilliard was publicly reprimanded by the party for "campaigning outside of authorised channels" during the election. In an interview with Hope Not Hate, former BNP parish councillor Dawn Charlton alleged that fake voters were added to the party's family membership system in order to increase Walker's total.

== Results ==
The share of the vote was split 21.23% to Hilliard and 76.58% to Walker. There were 15 spoiled ballot papers.

British National Party leadership election, 2015
Candidate	Votes	%
Adam Walker	523	76.58%
Paul Hilliard	145	21.23%
Spoiled ballots	15	2.19%
