= Adam Walker (British politician) =

Chairman of the British National Party

Chairman of the British National Party
- Incumbent
- Assumed office 27 July 2015; Acting: 21 July 2014 – 27 July 2015
- Preceded by: Nick Griffin

Deputy Chairman of the British National Party
- In office 21 July 2014 – 27 July 2015
- President: Nick Griffin
- Preceded by: Office established
- Succeeded by: Office abolished

Personal details
- Born: 1 April 1969 (age 57) Bishop Auckland, County Durham, England
- Citizenship: British
- Party: British National Party
- Children: 2
- Profession: Politician

Military service
- Allegiance: United Kingdom
- Branch/service: British Army
- Years of service: 1985–1990
- Unit: 15th/19th The King's Royal Hussars

Adam Walker is a British far-right politician who is the chairman of the British National Party (BNP). He was elected in a leadership election on 27 July 2015, having previously been appointed acting chairman by the National Executive when the then-leader, Nick Griffin, resigned.

== Biography ==
Walker was born in Bishop Auckland into a working-class background. The eldest of three children, his father was a joiner and his mother a seamstress. He has two children.

=== Military and teaching career ===
According to Walker, on 14 June 1985, two months after his sixteenth birthday, he joined the 15th/19th The King's Royal Hussars and served for five years as a battle tank crewman. Following discharge from the army, Walker states that he worked for some time in the construction industry before studying for a National Diploma in land use and recreation and later became a technology teacher at Houghton Kepier College near Sunderland, a post from which he was dismissed following allegations of "using school computers to look at extremist literature and engage in racially and religiously intolerant chatter online during school-time".

In September 2012, Walker was given a six-month suspended jail sentence and twelve-month driving ban for an incident on 23 April 2011, in which he verbally abused three schoolboys, who were between the ages of 10 and 12, chasing them in his Land Rover Discovery and slashing the tyres on their bikes with a sheath knife. After investigation by the General Teaching Council, Walker was banned for life from the profession in 2013. He challenged the ban in court, but his legal challenge was dismissed in February 2014.

In August 2016, Walker was arrested on suspicion of electoral fraud in connection with the BNP’s local election campaign in the Marsden ward of Pendle, Lancashire, after allegations concerning election expenses; he was later bailed by Lancashire Constabulary.

=== Political career ===
In 2010, Walker represented the BNP as part of a delegation led by French National Front leader Jean-Marie Le Pen to Yasukuni Shrine in Chiyoda, Tokyo. The Shinto shrine commemorates Japanese war dead and is revered by the far right in Japan. Visits to this shrine have traditionally been a sensitive point in international politics between Japan, Korea, and China.

Before becoming party chairman, Walker had been the BNP's deputy chairman. He described Britain in a November 2013 speech as a "multicultural shithole". He further said that Britons were facing "ethnic cleansing." He worked for the party with its two MEPs, Griffin and Andrew Brons, as well as serving as President of Solidarity – The Union for British Workers, a trade union established by the BNP.

During the 2010 general election Walker campaigned alongside Griffin wearing army uniform, which attracted widespread criticism and questions from journalists about whether Walker was a real soldier. When questioned, Walker said he was not a current soldier but was wearing the uniform in solidarity with British troops in Afghanistan.

Commenting on a fire bombing of a synagogue in Germany by a Muslim, Walker said, "While out campaigning several months ago, I spoke to a Jewish man who stated that he was considering moving with his family to Israel in light of the rising anti-Jewish sentiment from Muslims. We don't have an Israel, I said – we lose Britain, we've lost everything!"

After Nick Griffin stepped down as BNP leader on 19 July 2014 to become the organisation's president (he was later expelled from the party and thus the presidency in October 2014), Walker became interim leader until the leadership election in 2015. This was contested by Walker and Paul Hilliard, the BNP Derbyshire Sub Regional Organiser. The results were announced on 27 July 2015, with Walker winning with 523 votes (76.58%) against Hilliard's 145 (21.23%), with 15 spoiled ballot papers (2.19%).

Walker sought re-election in the leadership election in June 2019, since the party constitution required a leadership election to occur at least once every four years. His only opponent was the BNP press officer and national spokesman David Furness. The results were announced by the returning officer, David O'Loughlin, on 29 July 2019 at an unnamed venue in north west London. Walker won 308 votes (64.71%) to Furness' 161 (33.82%) and was re-elected BNP leader. There were 7 spoiled ballot papers (1.47%).

== Elections contested ==
UK Parliament elections

Date of election	Constituency	Party	Votes	% votes
2010	Bishop Auckland	BNP	2,036	4.9
2015	Rotherham	BNP	225	0.6
2017	Bishop Auckland	BNP	991	2.3

== See also ==
- Controversies surrounding Yasukuni Shrine

Party political offices
Preceded by Nick Griffin	Chairman of the British National Party; 2014–present	Succeeded by incumbent
