= Constitutional Convention Bill =

Proposed law

The Constitutional Convention Bill was a bill introduced in the British House of Commons by Graham Allen MP on 22 July 2015 and never went past the first reading. The bill was also introduced in the House of Lords by Lord Purvis of Tweed and reached committee stage.

== Aims ==
Under the bill, the following would be established:

- A Constitutional Convention would be created as a deliberative state organ.
- A position of Secretary of State for the Constitutional Convention would be created.
- The convention would consider and make recommendations on further devolution to Cornwall, England, Northern Ireland, Scotland, and Wales - specifically in legislative and fiscal matters, as well as the devolution of legal, political, electoral, and fiscal competence to local authorities.
- The convention would also consider and make recommendations on the reform of the electoral system (for all election types), the House of Lords, House of Commons, and local government, the role of the monarchy, Crown Dependencies, and British Overseas Territories, and matters and procedures to govern further conventions and constitutional reforms.
- And that these aims would be released within a year upon the bill being given Royal Assent.

== Origins ==
The Constitutional Convention Bill was first mentioned of in the Labour Party Manifesto for the 2015 General Election. The driving factor behind the Bill was that the Labour Party had been pushing constitutional reform, as well as the left-wing movement in general (see the House of Lords Reform Bill), and that there had not been a single constitutional document in the United Kingdom - rather a series of laws and agreements promulgated over centuries, like Magna Carta and the Act of Settlement (1701). This is a similar attempt to compile relevant legislation, comparable to when the Brown Ministry was working on the Equality Act, which was given royal assent in 2010.

== Composition ==
The Constitutional Convention would be composed of representatives of the nations and regions, the local authorities, and registered political parties. There was a quota of 50% percent of convention members that must not be in any employment that could be considered political.

== Related pages ==
- House of Lords Reform Bill 2012
