= 2016 Greater Manchester Labour Party mayoral selection =

Greater Manchester Labour Party (UK) mayoral selection 2016
- 9 August 2016
- Turnout: 65.3%
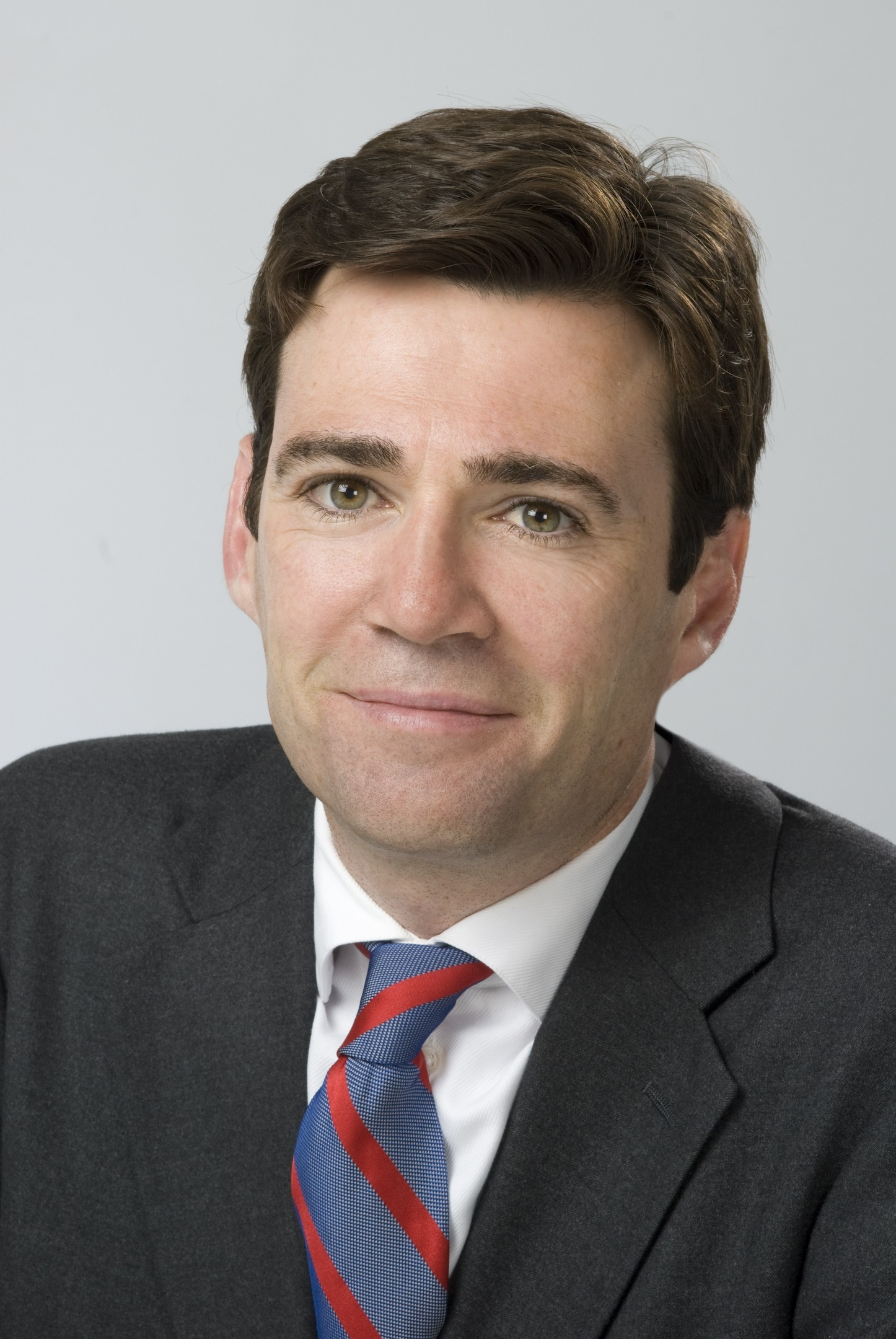

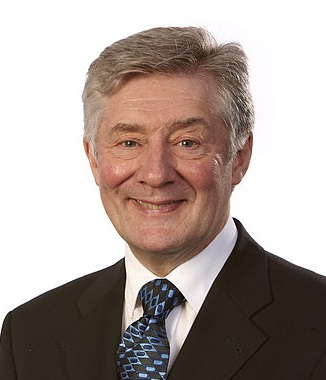

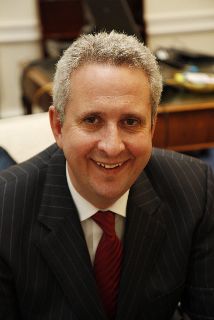
Candidate	Andy Burnham	Tony Lloyd	Ivan Lewis
Popular vote	3,792	2,163	1,472
Percentage	51.0%	29.1%	19.8%
Mayoral candidate
Andy Burnham
Labour

The Greater Manchester Labour Party mayoral selection of 2016 was the process by which the Labour Party selected its candidate for Mayor of Greater Manchester, to stand in the mayoral election on 4 May 2017. On 9 August 2016, The Labour Party announced that Andy Burnham had won the candidacy.

== Timetable ==
- 3 June 2016: Short-list announced
- 26 July 2016: Hustings, held by The Manchester Evening News
- 9 August 2016: Results announced

== Candidates ==
Name	Born	Current/previous positions	Announced candidacy	Campaign website (Slogan)
Andy Burnham	7 January 1970 (age 46)	Shadow Home Secretary (2015–2016); Secretary of State for Health (2009–2010); MP for Leigh (2001–2017)	5 May 2016	Andy 4 Mayor ("For a Greater Manchester")
Ivan Lewis	4 March 1967 (age 49)	Shadow Secretary of State for Northern Ireland (2013–2015); Minister of State for Foreign and Commonwealth Affairs (2009–2010); MP for Bury South (1997–2019)	18 February 2016	Ivan Lewis for Greater Manchester Mayor ("Fighting inequality together – Transforming Greater Manchester")
Tony Lloyd	25 February 1950 (age 66)	Mayor of Greater Manchester (interim) (2015–2017); Greater Manchester Police and Crime Commissioner (2012–2017); MP for Manchester Central (Stretford, 1983–1997) (1983–2012)	11 February 2016	Tony Lloyd for Greater Manchester Mayor ("Building Greater Manchester's Future")

== Result ==
First round
Candidate	Votes	Percentage
Andy Burnham	3,792	51.1%
Tony Lloyd	2,163	29.1%
Ivan Lewis	1,472	19.8%

Turnout was 65.3%, with 7,427 votes cast.

== Endorsements ==
Andy Burnham

- Debbie Abrahams, Shadow Secretary of State for Work and Pensions (2016–2018), MP for Oldham East and Saddleworth (2011–present)
- Yvonne Fovargue, MP for Makerfield (2010–2024)
- Andrew Gwynne, Shadow Health Minister (2011–present), MP for Denton and Reddish (2005–2026)

Ivan Lewis

- Alan Johnson, Former Labour Cabinet Minister (2004-2010), Chair of Labour IN for Britain (2016), MP for Kingston upon Hull West and Hessle (1997-present)
- Stella Creasy, MP for Walthamstow (2010–present)
- Cllr Rishi Shori, Leader of Bury Council
- Cllr Alex Ganotis, Leader of Stockport Metropolitan Borough Council
- Sir Richard Leese, Leader of Manchester City Council

Tony Lloyd

- Co-operative Party, UK centre-left political party closely affiliated to the Labour Party
- Theresa Griffin, MEP for North West England (2014–2020)
- Afzal Khan, MEP for North West England (2014–2017)
- Rebecca Long-Bailey, MP for Salford and Eccles (2015–present)
- Cllr Kieran Quin, Leader of Tameside Metropolitan Borough Council
- Yasmin Qureshi, MP for Bolton South East (2010–present)
- Angela Rayner, MP for Ashton-under-Lyne (2015–present)
- Unite the Union, largest trade union in the UK and Ireland

== See also ==
- Liverpool City Region Labour Party mayoral selection, 2016
- London Labour Party mayoral selection, 2015
