= 2015 London Labour Party mayoral selection =

London Labour Party (UK) mayoral selection 2015
- 14 August 2015 – 10 September 2015
- Turnout: 76.5%
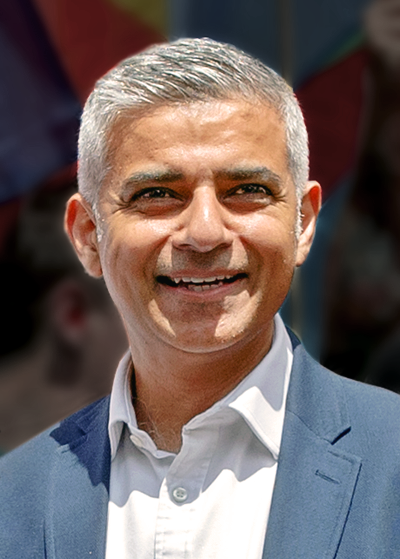

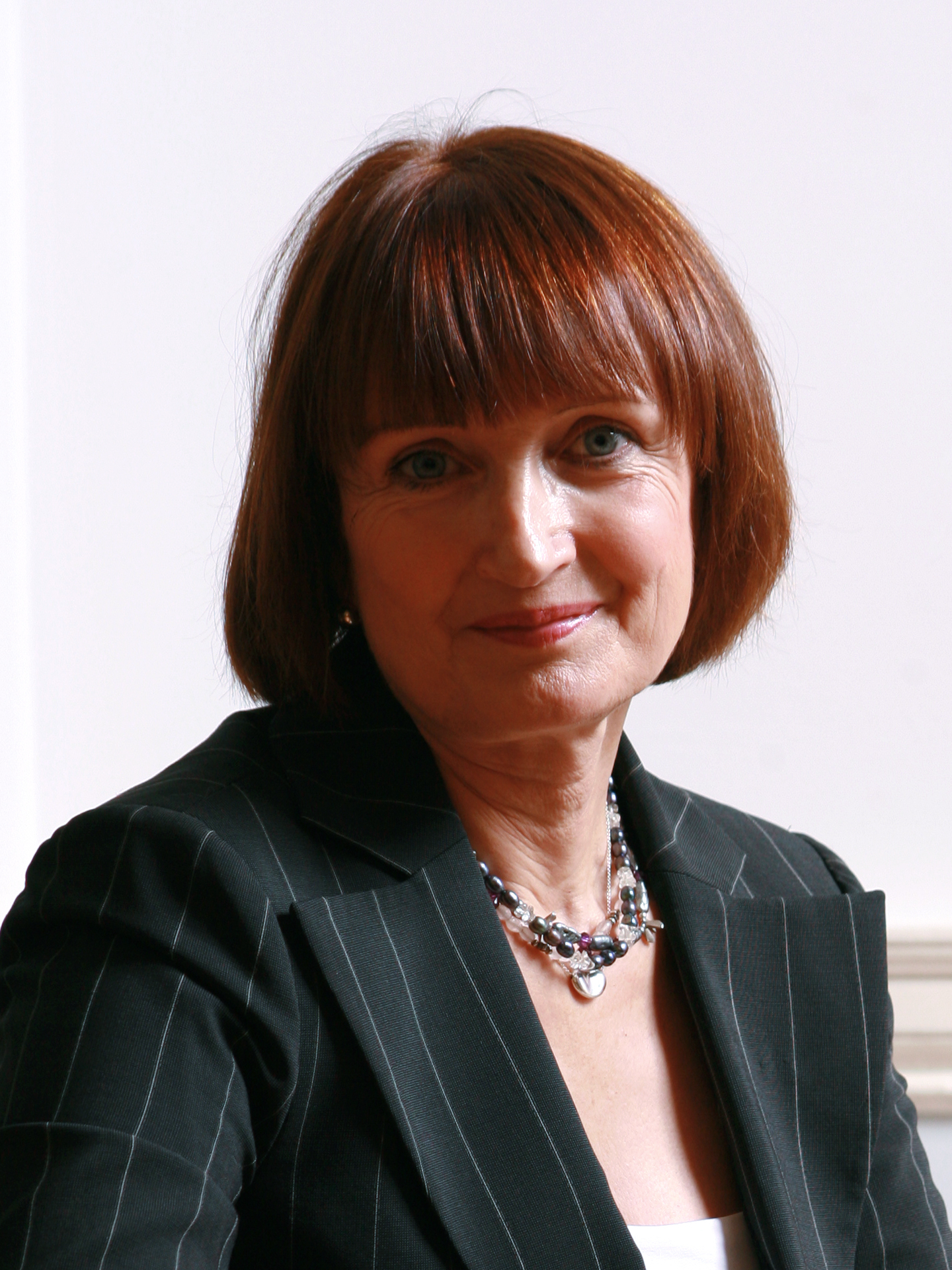

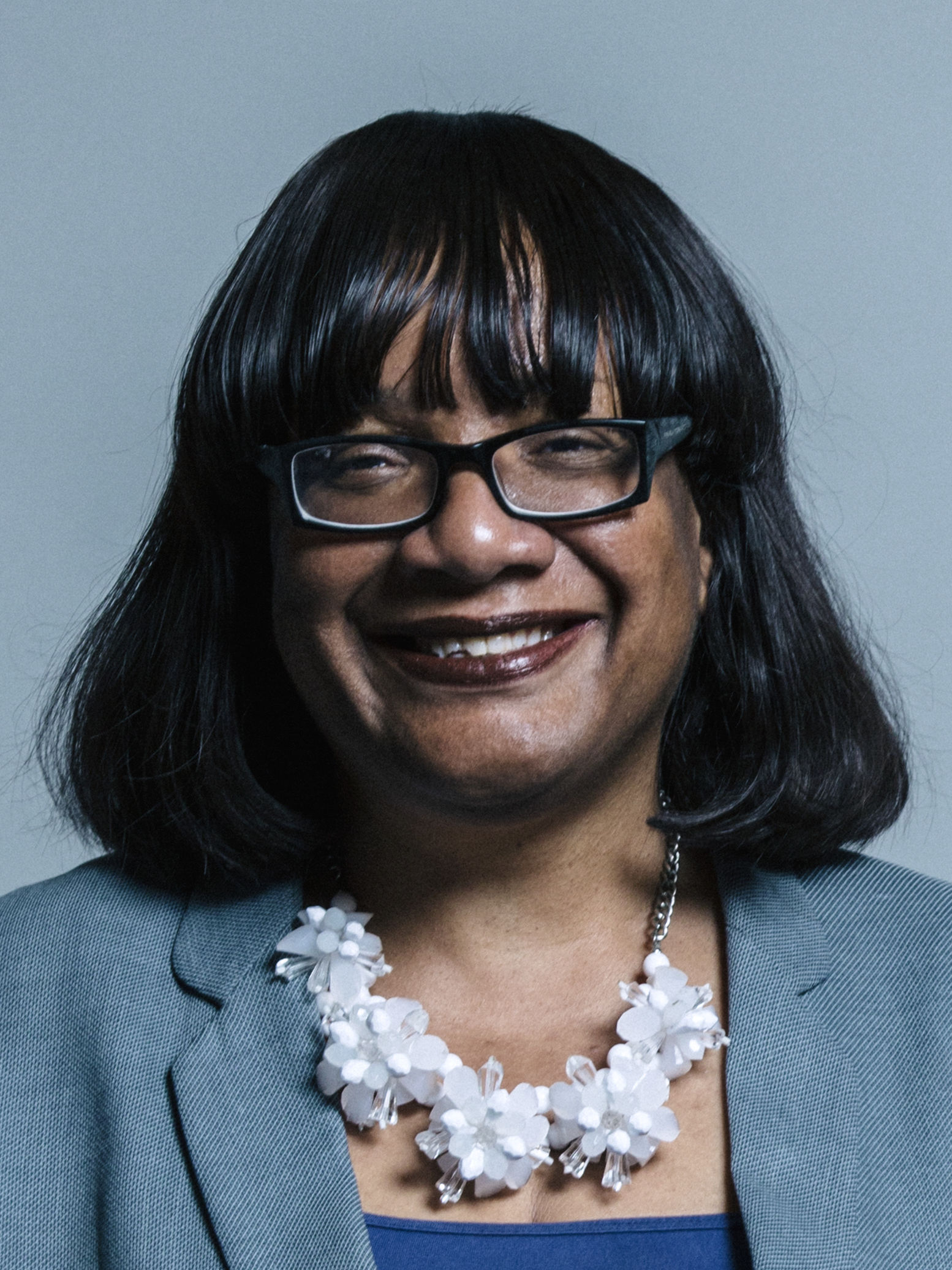

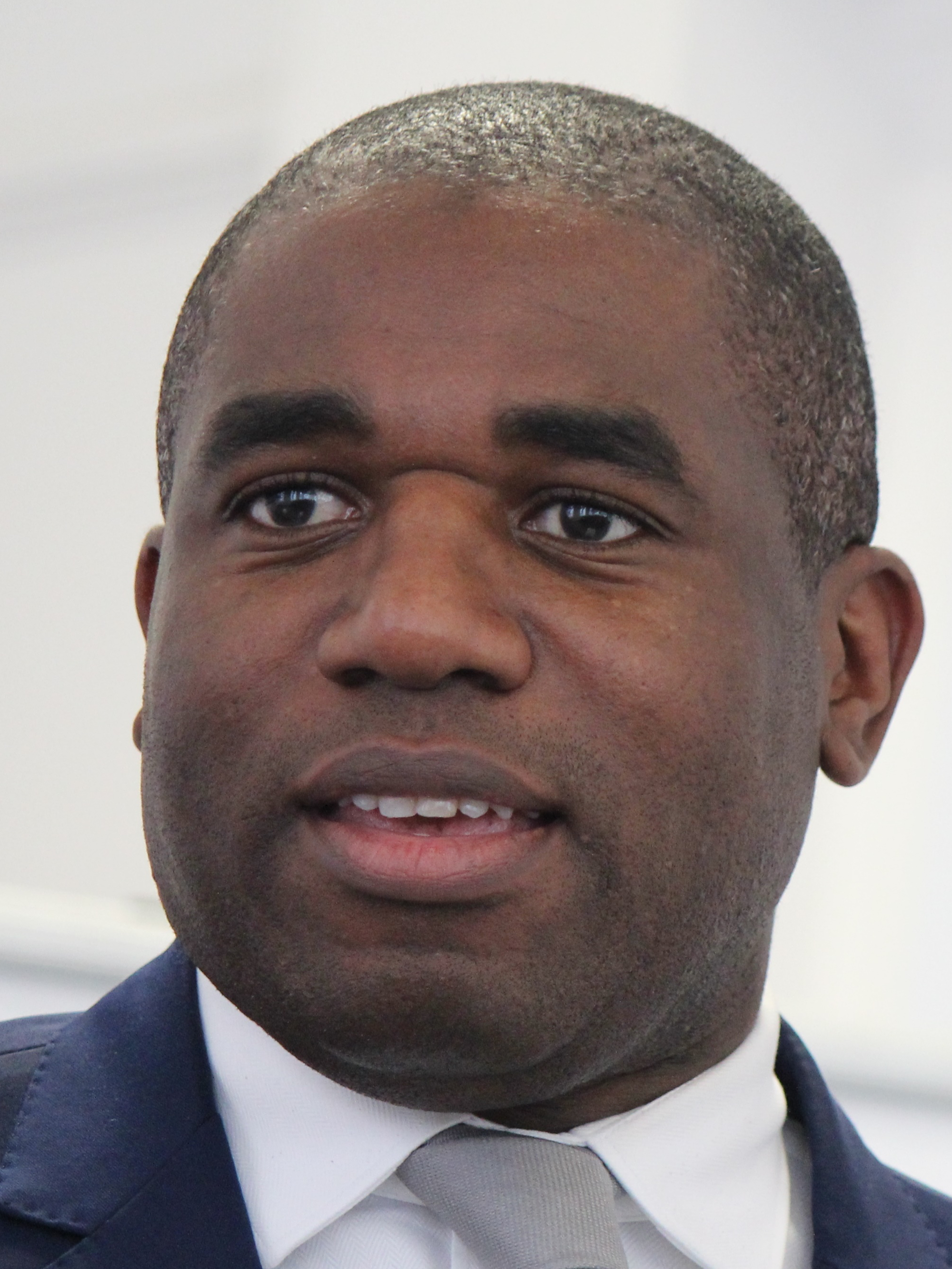

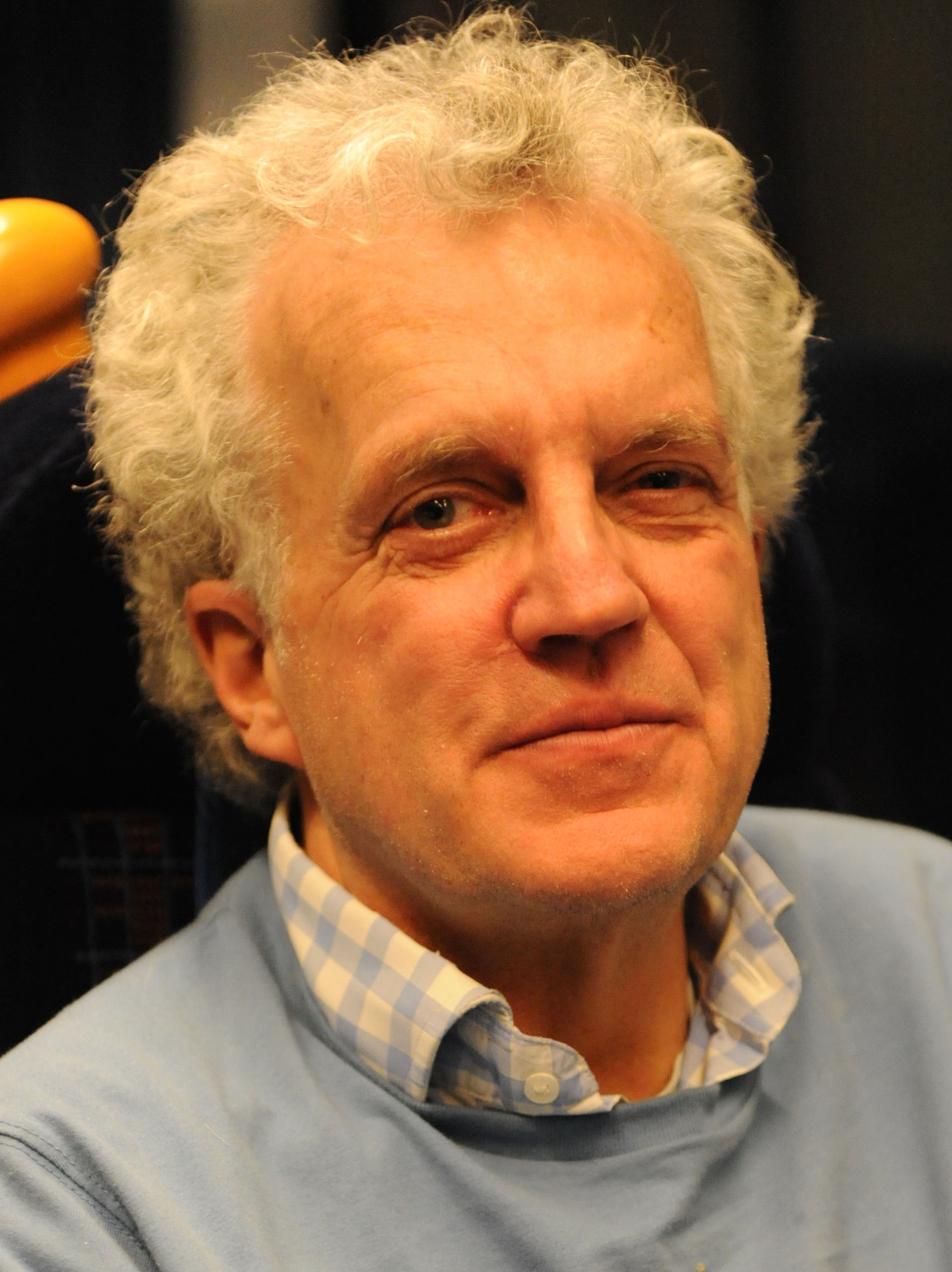

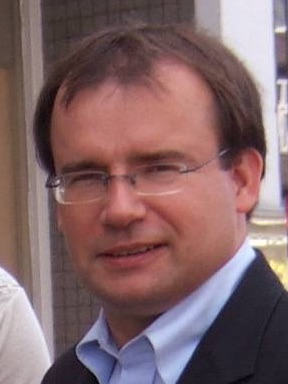
Candidate	Sadiq Khan	Tessa Jowell	Diane Abbott
1st Pref.	32,926	26,121	14,798
Percentage	37.5%	29.7%	16.8%
Final Pref.	48,151	33,575	—
Percentage	58.9%	41.1%	—
Candidate	David Lammy	Christian Wolmar	Gareth Thomas
1st Pref.	8,255	4,729	1,055
Percentage	9.4%	5.4%	1.2%
Elected Mayoral candidate
Sadiq Khan
Labour

The London Labour Party mayoral selection of 2015 was the process by which the Labour Party selected its candidate for Mayor of London, to stand in the mayoral election on 5 May 2016. It was the first mayoral selection process since 2002 not to feature Ken Livingstone as a candidate.

== Timetable ==
- 13 May 2015: Applications opened
- 20 May 2015 (12:00): Applications closed, Constituency Labour Party (CLP) nominations opened
- 10 June 2015: CLP nominations closed
- 12 June 2015: Selection Committee determines short-list
- 13 June 2015: Short-list announced
- 17 June 2015: First hustings, held in Camden
- 21 June 2015: Second hustings, held in Stratford
- 15 July 2015: Third hustings, held in Ealing
- 24 July 2015: Fourth hustings, held in Hornsey & Wood Green
- 30 July 2015: Final hustings, held in Southwark
- 12 August 2015 (12:00): Last date to join as an affiliated support or registered supporter of the Labour Party in London and be eligible to vote
- 14 August 2015: Ballot papers dispatched
- 10 September 2015 (12:00): Ballot closes
- 11 September 2015: Results announced

== Candidates ==
=== CLP nominations ===
To proceed in the Labour selection process, each applicant had to secure the nomination of at least five Constituency Labour Parties (CLPs) in the London region. There are 73 CLPs in London, and each CLP could make up to two nominations. The first nomination was required to be for one of the female candidates, and the second nomination could be for any candidate. Nominations were decided at open meetings of local parties, with all Labour members and registered/affiliated supporters within that CLP eligible to vote in person.

The results were as follows:

First nomination		Second nomination	
Candidate	CLPs	Candidate	CLPs
Tessa Jowell	63	Sadiq Khan	42
Diane Abbott	8	David Lammy	15
None	2	Christian Wolmar	6
		Gareth Thomas	6
		None	4

Keran Kerai and Neeraj Patil received no CLP nominations and were therefore eliminated from the contest. All six other applicants received enough nominations to go forward.

=== Announced ===
Nominated

Name	Born	Political office/position	Announced candidacy	Campaign website (Slogan)
Sadiq Khan (Selected)	8 October 1970 (age 55)	Shadow Secretary of State for Justice (2010–2015); Minister of State for Transport (2009–2010); MP for Tooting (2005–2016)	13 May 2015	Sadiq Khan – For London (Archived) ("Changing London together")
Tessa Jowell (Defeated)	17 September 1947 – 12 May 2018 (aged 70)	Minister for London (2007–2008; 2009–2010); Secretary of State for Culture, Media and Sport (2001–2007); MP for Dulwich and West Norwood (1992–2015)	19 May 2015	Tessa for Londoners (Archived) ("One London")
Diane Abbott (Defeated)	27 September 1953 (age 72)	Shadow Minister for Public Health (2010–2013); MP for Hackney North and Stoke Newington (1987–present)	13 May 2015	Diane for London (Archived)
David Lammy (Defeated)	19 July 1972 (age 54)	Minister of State for Innovation, Universities and Skills (2007–2010); MP for Tottenham (2000–present); Member of the London Assembly (2000)	4 September 2014	Lammy for Mayor (Archived) ("New London New Leadership")
Christian Wolmar (Defeated)	3 August 1949 (age 77)	Transport Correspondent for The Independent (1992–1996)	11 September 2012	Wolmar for London ("For a more affordable, liveable and sustainable London")
Gareth Thomas (Defeated)	15 July 1967 (age 59)	Chair of the Co-operative Party (2001–2019); Minister of State for International Development (2008–2010); MP for Harrow West (1997–present)	15 May 2015	Gareth Thomas for London (Archived) ("A London for All Londoners")

Eliminated

- Keran Kerai, writer based in Harrow
- Neeraj Patil, former Mayor of Lambeth (2010–2011) and Lambeth Borough Councillor for Larkhall Ward (2006–2014)

=== Declined ===
The following candidates considered running or were mentioned as possible candidates, but ultimately did not put themselves forward for selection.

- Andrew Adonis, Baron Adonis, Shadow Infrastructure Minister and former Secretary of State for Transport
- Margaret Hodge, Chair of the Public Accounts Committee and MP for Barking
- Eddie Izzard, comedian, actor and writer
- Alan Johnson, former Home Secretary and MP for Kingston upon Hull West
- Oona King, former MP for Bethnal Green and Bow and candidate for Mayor in 2012
- Doreen Lawrence, campaigner and mother of Stephen Lawrence
- Ken Livingstone, former Mayor of London
- Sir Robin Wales, Mayor of Newham

== Opinion polling ==
Poll source	Date(s) administered	Sample size	Margin of error	Diane Abbott	Tessa Jowell	Sadiq Khan	David Lammy	Gareth Thomas	Christian Wolmar	Other/ Undecided
YouGov/LBC	10–12 August 2015	452 Labour voters (Note: Persons who voted Labour in 2015 general election.)	± ?%	11%	23%	16%	9%	3%	1%	37%
YouGov/LBC	10–12 August 2015	1,153 British residents (Note: Residents over 18 in Great Britain)	± ?%	7%	19%	10%	5%	2%	2%	55%
LabourList	3–7 August 2015	2,791 LabourList readers (Note: Persons who responded to a LabourList survey.)	± ?%	23%	36%	23%	7%	1%	9%	1%
YouGov/Evening Standard	30 June – 2 July 2015	410 Labour voters	± ?%	8%	24%	13%	14%	3%	1%	37%
YouGov/Evening Standard	30 June – 2 July 2015	1,047 British residents	± ?%	7%	16%	8%	8%	2%	2%	56%
LabourList	29 June – 3 July 2015	? LabourList readers	± ?%	12%	35%	18%	9%	1%	12%	13%
YouGov/Evening Standard	8–11 June 2015	433 Labour voters	± ?%	9%	23%	20%	9%	1%	1%	37%
YouGov/Evening Standard	8–11 June 2015	1,236 British residents	± ?%	6%	15%	10%	6%	1%	1%	60%
LabourList	22–26 May 2015	2,274 LabourList readers	± ?%	13.8%	30.9%	28.8%	9.9%	2.4%	9.9%	4.3%
YouGov/Evening Standard	29 April – 1 May 2015	? British residents	± ?%	8%	16%	7%	6%	–	1%	62%
YouGov/Evening Standard	26–30 March 2015	405 Labour voters	± ?%	11%	24%	11%	9%	–	1%	44%
YouGov/Evening Standard	26–30 March 2015	1,064 British residents	± ?%	8%	17%	6%	6%	–	1%	62%
YouGov/Evening Standard	27 February – 2 March 2015	373 Labour voters	± ?%	11%	21%	12%	8%	–	2%	46%
YouGov/Evening Standard	27 February – 2 March 2015	1,011 British residents	± ?%	6%	13%	7%	5%	–	1%	68%
YouGov/Evening Standard	26–29 January 2015	? Labour voters	± ?%	12%	26%	19%	14%	–	2%	27%
YouGov/Evening Standard	8–13 October 2014	? Labour voters	± ?%	9%	16%	10%	8%	–	1%	56%
YouGov/Evening Standard	8–13 October 2014	1,002 British residents	± ?%	7%	12%	6%	5%	–	1%	69%
YouGov/Evening Standard	24–26 September 2014	439 Labour voters	± ?%	11%	18%	10%	11%	–	0%	49%
YouGov/Evening Standard	24–26 September 2014	1,086 British residents	± ?%	6%	12%	6%	6%	–	1%	70%
YouGov/Evening Standard	21–24 July 2014	489 Labour voters	± ?%	14%	16%	6%	6%	–	2%	56%
YouGov/Evening Standard	21–24 July 2014	1,350 British residents	± ?%	8%	12%	4%	4%	–	2%	70%
LabourList	23–27 June 2015	722 LabourList readers	± ?%	15%	17%	22%	7%	–	–	39%
YouGov/Evening Standard	17–19 June 2014	? Labour voters	± ?%	17%	14%	8%	9%	–	–	52%
YouGov/Evening Standard	17–19 June 2014	1,115 British residents	± ?%	9%	11%	5%	6%	–	–	69%
YouGov/Evening Standard	8–10 October 2013	445 Labour voters	± ?%	13%	20%	9%	10%	–	–	48%
YouGov/Evening Standard	8–10 October 2013	1,231 British residents	± ?%	9%	17%	5%	7%	–	–	62%

== Results ==
Between 14 August and 10 September, affiliated and registered supporters and members of the Labour Party in London were able to vote. Turnout was 81% for members, 92% for registered supporters, and 45% for affiliated supporters.

2015 London Labour Party selection
Candidate	Round 1		Round 2		Round 3		Round 4		Round 5	
Candidate	Votes	%	Votes	%	Votes	%	Votes	%	Votes	%
Sadiq Khan	32,926	37.5%	33,141	37.8%	34,813	40.0%	38,440	44.7%	Won 48,152	Won 58.9%
Tessa Jowell	26,121	29.7%	26,406	30.1%	27,272	31.3%	29,785	34.6%	33,573	41.1%
Diane Abbott	14,798	16.8%	14,891	17.0%	15,878	18.2%	17,784	20.7%	Eliminated	
David Lammy	8,255	9.4%	8,392	9.6%	9,147	10.5%	Eliminated			
Christian Wolmar	4,729	5.4%	4,927	5.6%	Eliminated					
Gareth Thomas	1,055	1.2%	Eliminated							
Inactive votes	0 ballots		127 ballots		774 ballots		1,875 ballots		6,159 ballots	

=== Result by round ===
First round
Candidate	Party members		Registered supporters		Affiliated supporters		Total	
Candidate	Votes	%	Votes	%	Votes	%	Votes	%
Sadiq Khan	17,518	33.8%	11,077	42.1%	4,331	44.1%	32,926	37.5%
Tessa Jowell	19,324	37.3%	4,442	16.9%	2,355	24.0%	26,121	29.7%
Diane Abbott	6,890	13.3%	6,216	23.6%	1,692	17.2%	14,798	16.8%
David Lammy	5,191	10.0%	2,318	8.8%	746	7.6%	8,255	9.4%
Christian Wolmar	2,195	4.2%	1,997	7.6%	537	5.5%	4,729	5.4%
Gareth Thomas	650	1.3%	241	0.9%	164	1.7%	1,055	1.2%

Second round
Candidate	Party members		Registered supporters		Affiliated supporters		Total	
Candidate	Votes	%	Votes	%	Votes	%	Votes	%
Sadiq Khan	17,665	34.2%	11,121	42.4%	4,355	44.4%	33,141	37.8%
Tessa Jowell	19,535	37.8%	4,477	17.1%	2,394	24.4%	26,406	30.1%
Diane Abbott	6,943	13.4%	6,238	23.8%	1,710	17.4%	14,891	17.0%
David Lammy	5,279	10.2%	2,353	9.0%	760	7.8%	8,392	9.6%
Christian Wolmar	2,288	4.4%	2,057	7.8%	582	5.9%	4,927	5.6%

Third round
Candidate	Party members		Registered supporters		Affiliated supporters		Total	
Candidate	Votes	%	Votes	%	Votes	%	Votes	%
Sadiq Khan	18,433	35.8%	11,835	45.6%	4,545	46.8%	34,813	40.0%
Tessa Jowell	20,064	39.0%	4,710	18.1%	2,498	25.7%	27,272	31.3%
Diane Abbott	7,323	14.2%	6,737	26.0%	1,818	18.7%	15,878	18.2%
David Lammy	5,632	10.9%	2,671	10.3%	844	8.7%	9,147	10.5%

Fourth round
Candidate	Party members		Registered supporters		Affiliated supporters		Total	
Candidate	Votes	%	Votes	%	Votes	%	Votes	%
Sadiq Khan	20,628	40.5%	12,944	50.7%	4,868	50.7%	38,440	44.7%
Tessa Jowell	21,851	43.0%	5,237	20.5%	2,697	28.1%	29,785	34.6%
Diane Abbott	8,396	16.5%	7,345	28.8%	2,043	21.3%	17,784	20.7%

Fifth round
Candidate	Party members		Registered supporters		Affiliated supporters		Total	
Candidate	Votes	%	Votes	%	Votes	%	Votes	%
Sadiq Khan ✓	24,983	51.0%	17,179	73.0%	5,990	65.2%	48,152	58.9%
Tessa Jowell	24,019	49.0%	6,351	27.0%	3,203	34.8%	33,573	41.1%

== See also ==
- 2016 Greater Manchester Labour Party mayoral selection
- 2015 London Conservative Party mayoral selection
