= 2015 London Conservative Party mayoral selection =

London Conservative Party mayoral selection 2015
- 2 October 2015
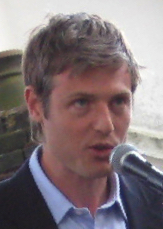

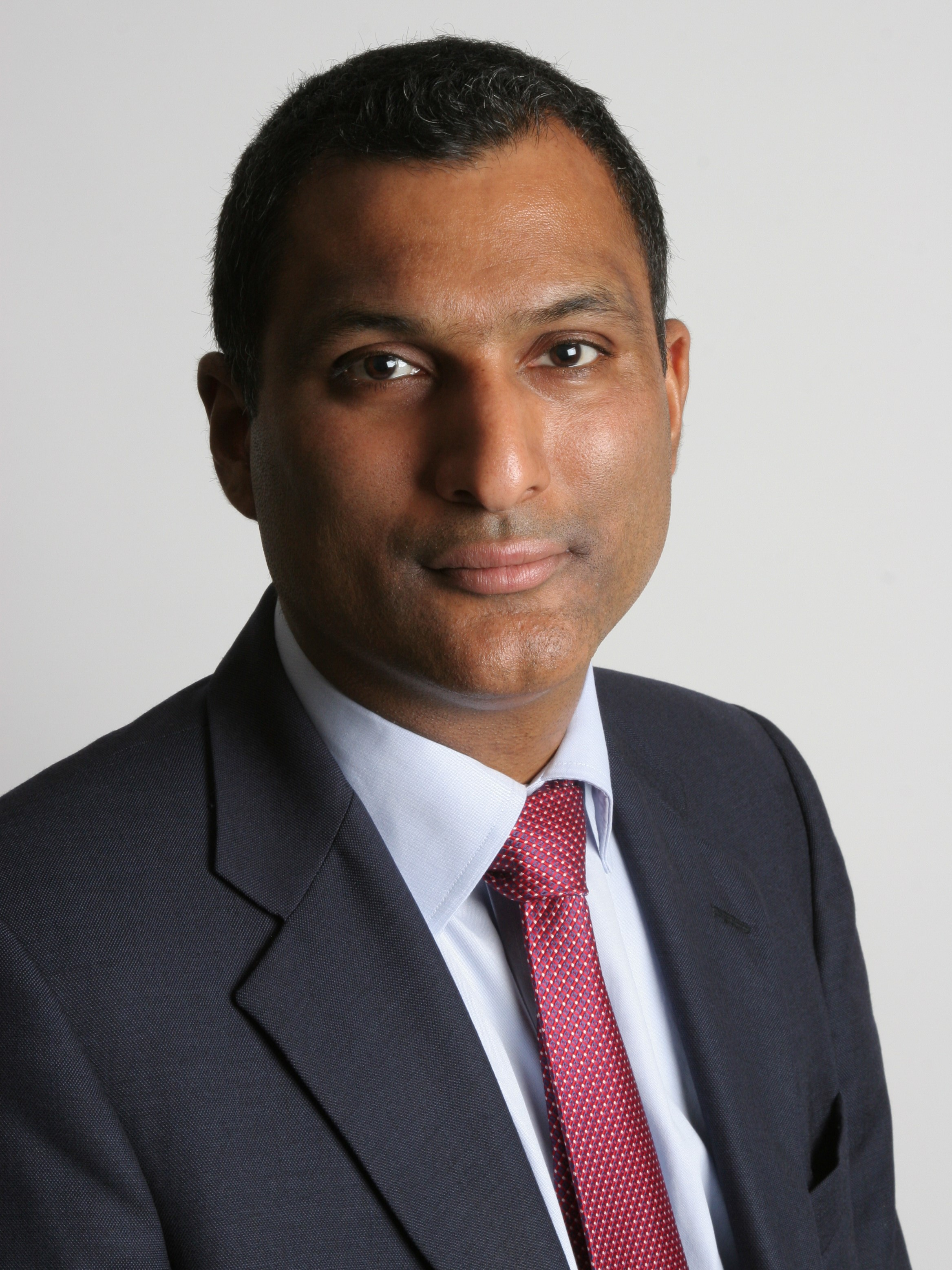

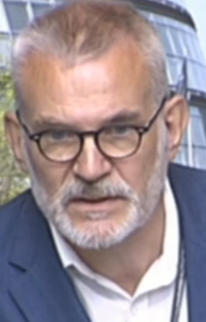
Candidate	Zac Goldsmith	Syed Kamall
Popular vote	6,514	1,477
Percentage	70.6%	16.0%
Candidate	Stephen Greenhalgh	Andrew Boff
Popular vote	864	372
Percentage	9.4%	4.0%
Elected Mayoral candidate
Zac Goldsmith
Conservative

The London Conservative Party mayoral selection of 2015 was the process by which the Conservative Party selected its candidate for Mayor of London, to stand in the 2016 mayoral election. Member of Parliament Zac Goldsmith was selected to stand.

== Selection process ==
The Mayoral candidate was selected via an Open primary that was open to all London voters who were on the electoral roll. Voters had to register to vote at a charge of £1.00.

== Candidates ==
- Zac Goldsmith, Member of Parliament for Richmond Park
- Syed Kamall, Member of the European Parliament for London
- Stephen Greenhalgh, Deputy Mayor for Policing and Crime
- Andrew Boff, Member of the London Assembly

== Result ==
Candidate	Votes	%
Zac Goldsmith	6,514	70.6
Syed Kamall	1,477	16.0
Stephen Greenhalgh	864	9.4
Andrew Boff	372	4.0
Total	9,227	

== See also ==
- 2016 London mayoral election
