= 2004 London mayoral election =

London mayoral election

- 10 June 2004
- Registered: 1,920,560
- Turnout: 36.95% ▲2.55 pp
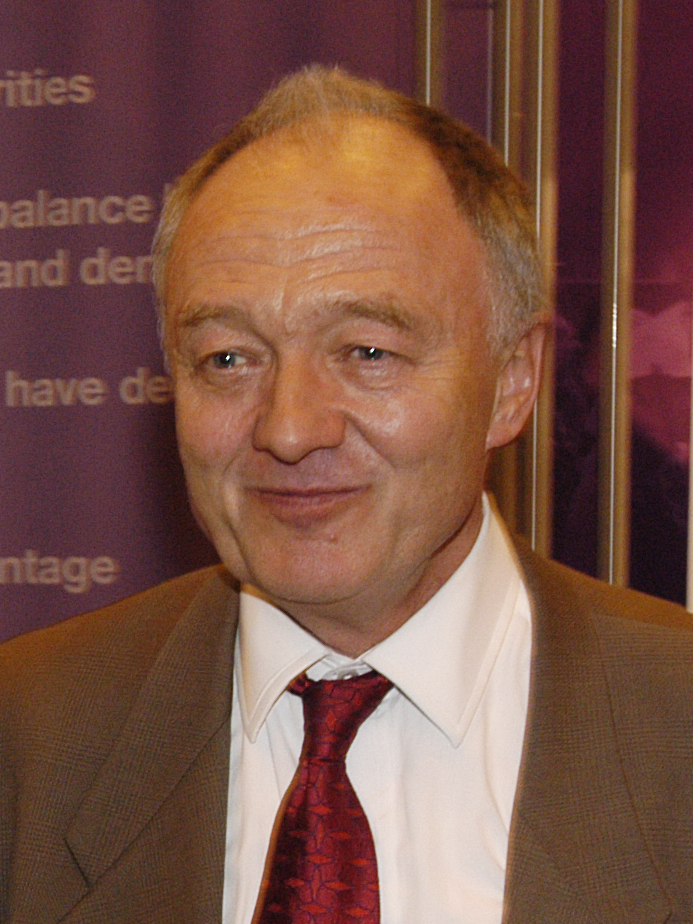

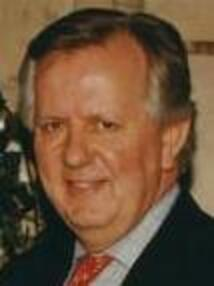

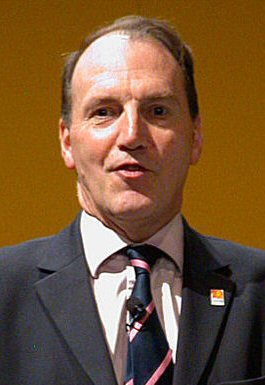

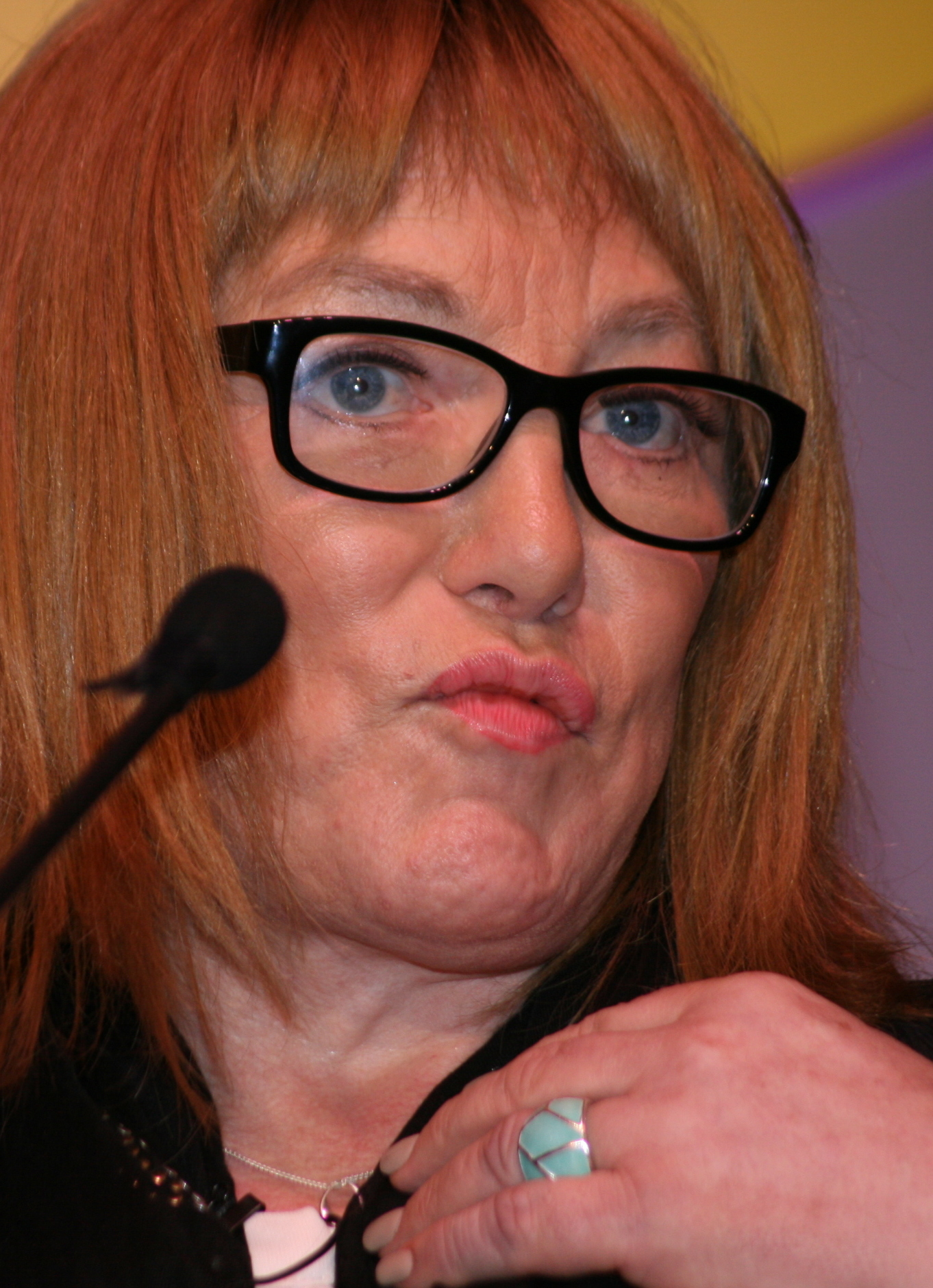
Candidate	Ken Livingstone	Steven Norris
Party	Labour	Conservative
First Round	685,548	542,423
Percentage	37.0%	29.1%
Swing	▼15.0pp (Note: Changes from the combined vote share of Ken Livingstone and Frank Dobson in 2000.)	▲2.2pp
Second Round	828,390	667,180
Percentage	55.4%	44.6%
Swing	▼2.5pp	▲2.5pp
Candidate	Simon Hughes	Frank Maloney (Note: Maloney is now known as Kellie due to gender transition in 2014.)
Party	Liberal Democrats	UKIP
First Round	284,647	115,666
Percentage	15.3%	6.2%
Swing	▲3.5pp	▲5.3pp
Second Round	Eliminated	Eliminated
- First preference votes by London borough. Blue boroughs are those with most first preference votes for Steven Norris and red those for Ken Livingstone
Mayor before election
Ken Livingstone
Independent
Elected mayor
Ken Livingstone
Labour

The 2004 election to the post of Mayor of London took place on 10 June 2004. It was being held on the same day as other local elections and the UK part of the 2004 European Parliament elections, so Londoners had a total of five votes on three ballot papers. Polling opened at 07:00 local time, and closed at 22:00. The Supplementary Vote system was used.

Ken Livingstone of the Labour Party was re-elected Mayor, beating Steven Norris of the Conservative Party with 55.4% to 44.6% of first and second-preference votes.

== Candidate selection ==
=== Labour ===
Ken Livingstone gained the Labour Party nomination in February 2004, three weeks after being re-admitted to the party, after deputy Mayor Nicky Gavron, the previous candidate-elect, stepped down in favour of Livingstone.

=== Conservatives ===
Steven Norris was chosen as the Conservative Party candidate for the second time, having previously been beaten by Livingstone in the 2000 London mayoral election.

=== Liberal Democrats ===
On 5 March 2003, Simon Hughes, MP for North Southwark and Bermondsey and Frontbench Spokesman for Home Affairs was selected as the Liberal Democrats candidate over Susan Kramer, the Liberal Democrats 2000 candidate for the mayoralty and the prospective parliamentary candidate for Richmond Park, and environmentalist Donnachadh McCarthy.

Candidate	Votes	%
Simon Hughes MP	3,168	62.2
Susan Kramer	1,762	34.6
Donnachadh McCarthy	163	3.2
Total	5,093	

== Summary of policies ==
From the Manifesto booklet

Ken Livingstone – Standing up for London

- continue recovery from two decades of neglect under the Conservatives
- continue the programme of increased neighbourhood policing
- cut crime and make streets, parks and public transport safer
- continue reducing traffic congestion by extending the Congestion Charge Zone
- extend improvements in bus services and delivering similar improvements to the rest of the transport system
- improve transport in outer London with better buses and new tram lines
- run the Tube later every Friday and Saturday night with a free service on New Year's Eve
- work with government and voluntary sector with a long-term aim that all parents have access to high quality, affordable childcare.
- build 30,000 new homes a year and continue providing affordable housing
- tackle air pollution, making London a Low Emission Zone with rigorous pollution standards for lorries, buses, coaches and taxis.
- provide free bus travel to under-18s in full-time education
- bring the Olympic Games to London in 2012

Steve Norris – For a Safer London

- cut crime, particularly street crime, vandalism and graffiti
- put more police officers on patrol rather than in cars or offices
- encourage "zero tolerance" for minor crimes like graffiti, vandalism and public drunkenness
- increase share of police officers assigned to outer London
- double funding of youth projects
- launch a New York-style ‘CompStat’ system to target and manage crime more effectively
- introduce free school buses for children at primary schools to cut congestion
- abolish the congestion charge
- run London Underground until 3am at weekends, install air conditioning and provide security guards at night

Simon Hughes – A New Mayor for a Greater London

- make London safer, easier and more liveable
- make London cleaner and greener
- continue and improve community policing
- improve public transport
- run the tube late for three nights per week
- make stations safer
- challenge the Labour government on Council Tax, the war in Iraq and student fees
- provide a strong voice for London, putting Londoners' security and safety first

Frank Maloney – Stop the career politicians

- increase the number of police officers, decrease the amount of political correctness in policing and support victims of crime
- abolish the congestion charge, oppose speed cameras and speed humps
- create a 24-hour transport system and extend the London Underground to South East London
- put more conductors on buses, and provide free bus travel for under-18s on the way to school
- stop selling school playing fields, increasing funding for youth clubs and fund competitive sports for young people, including a London youth games
- fund mayoral scholarships for disadvantaged children to go to university
- allow business to open for 24 hours, and give assistance to businesses in deprived areas
- preserve and encourage all London's street markets
- celebrate St George's Day with an annual parade
- support the 2012 Olympic bid and other international events, marketing London internationally
- reduce the Mayor's take of Council tax
- abolish the GLA
- campaign for a higher state pension and tighter immigration controls
- provide more affordable homes for young British people and regenerate council estates

== Potential candidates ==
London-born comedian Lee Hurst seriously considered standing as a candidate in the election. His comedy club had been under threat of redevelopment, and this had re-ignited a spark of political ambition. His manifesto would probably have included policies such as scrapping bus lanes and the congestion charge, improving public transport (including the re-introduction of bus conductors and AEC Routemaster buses), and tackling crime and abandoned cars.

== Results ==
Mayor of London election 10 June 2004
Party	Candidate	1st round		2nd round			1st round votesTransfer votes, 2nd round
Party	Candidate	Total	Of round	Transfers	Total	Of round	1st round votesTransfer votes, 2nd round
Labour	Ken Livingstone	685,548	36.8%	142,842	828,390	55.4%	
Conservative	Steven Norris	542,423	29.1%	124,757	667,180	44.6%	
Liberal Democrats	Simon Hughes	284,647	15.3%				
UKIP	Frank Maloney (Note: Maloney is now known as Kellie due to gender transition in 2014.)	115,666	6.2%				
Respect	Lindsey German	61,731	3.3%				
BNP	Julian Leppert	58,407	3.1%				
Green	Darren Johnson	57,332	3.1%				
CPA	Ram Gidoomal	31,698	2.2%				
Ind. Working Class	Lorna Reid	9,452	0.5%				
Independent	Tammy Nagalingam	6,692	0.4%				
Labour gain from Independent							

- Turnout: 1,920,560 (36.95% - ▲2.55%)
- Electorate: 5,197,792
- As the ballot papers are counted electronically, totals for all second preferences are available, even though most did not contribute to the final result.

== Maps ==
Results by assembly constituency

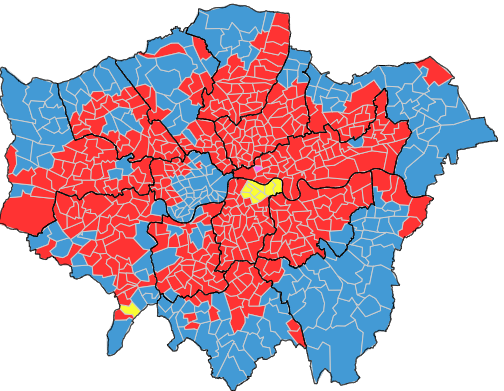
Result by electoral ward
