= 2026 Richmond upon Thames London Borough Council election =

2026 English local government election

- 7 May 2026

All 54 seats to Richmond upon Thames London Borough Council 28 seats needed for a majority
- Registered: 141,190
- Turnout: 71,688; 50.8% (▲3.0 pp)
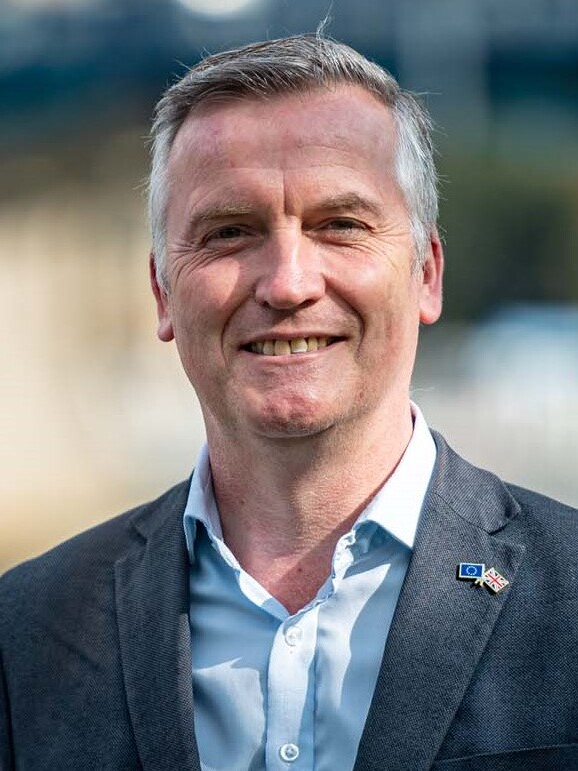
	First party
Leader	Gareth Roberts
Party	Liberal Democrats
Last election	48 seats, 56.5%
Seats before	49
Seats won	54
Seat change	▲6
Popular vote	106,774
Percentage	51.5%
Swing	▼5.0pp
- Map of the results of the 2026 Richmond upon Thames Borough Council election
Leader before election
Gareth Roberts
Liberal Democrats
Leader after election
Gareth Roberts
Liberal Democrats

The 2026 Richmond upon Thames London Borough Council election took place on 7 May 2026. All 54 members of Richmond upon Thames London Borough Council were elected. The elections took place alongside local elections in the other London boroughs and elections to local authorities across the United Kingdom.

The Liberal Democrats, who have controlled the council since the 2018 election, and increased their majority in the 2022 election, once again increased their majority to become the only party on the council, taking all 54 seats. The opposition Green Party and Conservative Party were thus left without representation, however Conservatives had previously lost their sole seat in a by-election in 2024.

== Background ==
=== History ===
The thirty-two London boroughs were established in 1965 by the London Government Act 1963. They are the principal authorities in Greater London and have responsibilities including education, housing, planning, highways, social services, libraries, recreation, waste, environmental health and revenue collection. Some of the powers are shared with the Greater London Authority, which also manages passenger transport, police and fire.

Since its formation, Richmond upon Thames has been under Conservative control, Liberal Democrat control, SDP–Liberal Alliance control and no overall control. The Liberal Democrats regained control from the Conservatives in the election in 2018. They won 39 seats with 46.7% of the vote across the borough while the Conservatives won 11 seats with 37.6% of the vote and the Greens won 4.5% of the vote. The Labour Party won 10.4% of the vote but did not win any seats. The leader of the Liberal Democrat group, Gareth Roberts, became council leader following the election.

=== Council term ===
A by-election for Hampton North ward was held on 18 January 2024, with the Liberal Democrats gaining the seat from the Conservatives. On the same day, a by-election was held for Teddington ward with the Liberal Democrats holding the seat.

Andrée Frieze became leader of the Green Party group in May 2023, she planned to retire at this election.

== Electoral process ==
Richmond upon Thames, like other London borough councils, elects all of its councillors at once every four years. The previous election took place in 2022. The election will take place by plurality block voting, with each ward being represented by two or three councillors. Electors had as many votes as there are councillors to be elected in their ward, with the top two or three being elected.

All registered electors (British, Irish, Commonwealth and European Union citizens) living in London aged 18 or over are entitled to vote in this election. People who live at two addresses in different councils, such as university students with different term-time and holiday addresses, are entitled to be registered for and vote in elections in both local authorities.

== Previous council composition ==
After 2022 election		Before 2026 election	
Party	Seats	Party	Seats
Liberal Democrats	48	Liberal Democrats	49
Green	5	Green	5
Conservative	1	Conservative	0

== Election result ==
Council composition after the 2022 election

Council composition after the 2026 election

2026 Richmond upon Thames London Borough Council election
Party	Candidates	Seats	Gains	Losses	Net gain/loss	Seats %	Votes %	Votes	+/−
Liberal Democrats	54	54	6	-	▲6	100.0	51.25	106,774	▼5.25
Conservative	54	0	-	1	▼1	-	18.26	38,050	▼8.34
Green	54	0	-	5	▼5	-	16.04	33,414	▲10.64
Reform	45	0	-	-	Steady	-	9.56	19,916	NEW
Labour	54	0	-	-	Steady	-	4.49	9,361	▼6.61
No Description	2	0	-	-	Steady	-	0.35	737	N/A
Independent	1	0	-	-	Steady	-	0.05	105	▼0.65

== Wards results ==
Candidates seeking re-election are marked with an asterisk (*). Councillors seeking re-election for a different ward are marked with a cross (†).

Due to an administrative error, some candidates lacked the description ‘Green Party’ in wards where the party did not already have councillors; however, the Green Party emblem appeared against their names on all ballots.

=== Barnes ===
Barnes (3 seats)
Party	Candidate	Votes	%	±%
Liberal Democrats	Fiona Sacks*	1,800	45.4	−6.3
Liberal Democrats	Andy Hale*	1,728	43.6	−6.2
Liberal Democrats	Duncan Rasor	1,586	40.0	−9.4
Conservative	Helen Edward	1,365	34.4	−6.2
Conservative	Carlos Garofolin	1,216	30.7	−12.7
Conservative	Sandy Urquhart	1,212	30.6	−7.2
Green	Kieran Sheedy	397	10.0	N/A
Green	Miranda Lewis	382	9.6	N/A
Reform	Mark Fox	380	9.6	N/A
Green	Kim Marshall	367	9.3	N/A
Reform	Christopher MacNee	346	8.7	N/A
Reform	Guy Rose	328	8.3	N/A
Labour	Stephen Russell	151	3.8	−2.8
Labour	Sam Cullen	126	3.2	−2.6
Independent	Ivan Avanessov	105	2.6	N/A
Labour	Sujata Patel	103	2.6	−3.8
Turnout		3,974	51.64	+1.1
Registered electors		7,695		
Liberal Democrats hold		Swing		
Liberal Democrats hold		Swing		
Liberal Democrats hold		Swing		

=== East Sheen ===
East Sheen (3 seats)
Party	Candidate	Votes	%	±%
Liberal Democrats	Julia Cambridge*	2,198	55.8	−8.8
Liberal Democrats	Margaret Dane*	1,951	49.6	−8.1
Liberal Democrats	Mohsin Khan	1,775	45.1	−11.8
Conservative	Nick King	1,069	27.2	−4.4
Conservative	Luke Parker	972	24.7	−5.9
Conservative	Claudia Nascimento	962	24.4	−6.0
Green	Danielle Coleman	546	13.9	N/A
Green	David Hopwood	393	10.0	N/A
Green	Jill Winser	382	9.7	N/A
Reform	Philip Nuthall	360	9.1	N/A
Reform	Juliet Rawlings	347	8.8	N/A
Labour	Deborah Genders	177	4.5	−3.4
Labour	Mike Freedman	125	3.2	−3.2
Labour	Tracey Mullins	120	3.0	−3.4
Turnout		3,944	52.00	+0.7
Registered electors		7,584		
Liberal Democrats hold		Swing		
Liberal Democrats hold		Swing		
Liberal Democrats hold		Swing		

=== Fulwell and Hampton Hill ===
Fulwell and Hampton Hill (3 seats)
Party	Candidate	Votes	%	±%
Liberal Democrats	Jonathan Cardy*	2,289	55.5	−8.2
Liberal Democrats	Matthew Wherry	2,092	50.7	N/A
Liberal Democrats	Matthew Hull*	1,876	45.5	−16.4
Green	Nansi Eggleton	1,188	28.8	−29.0
Green	David Trigg	850	20.6	N/A
Green	Tim Highmoor	746	18.1	N/A
Conservative	Jo Brown	589	14.3	−7.8
Conservative	John Goodwin	504	12.2	−7.3
Conservative	Julian Marsh	449	10.9	−6.6
Reform	Magnus Forster-Brown	420	10.2	N/A
Reform	Gavin Nichols	396	9.6	N/A
Labour	Eva Tutchell	199	4.8	−9.3
Labour	John Edmonds	180	4.4	−6.8
Labour	James Johnson	146	3.5	−8.3
Turnout		4,123	51.34	+4.2
Registered electors		8,030		
Liberal Democrats hold		Swing		
Liberal Democrats hold		Swing		
Liberal Democrats gain from Green		Swing		

=== Ham, Petersham and Richmond Riverside ===
Ham, Petersham and Richmond Riverside (3 seats)
Party	Candidate	Votes	%	±%
Liberal Democrats	Penny Frost*	2,097	53.6	−12.3
Liberal Democrats	Seamus Joyce	1,735	44.4	−15.2
Liberal Democrats	Dermot Kelly	1,654	42.3	N/A
Green	Chas Warlow†	1,154	29.5	−28.3
Green	Jaydan Okunola	1,043	26.7	N/A
Green	Lauren Stansfield	1,033	26.4	N/A
Reform	John Rose	480	12.3	N/A
Conservative	Georgina Butler	470	12.0	−10.5
Reform	Andrew Swarbrick	440	11.3	N/A
Reform	Oliver Lafci	439	11.2	N/A
Conservative	John Traversi	374	9.6	−9.2
Conservative	Robert Tudway	344	8.8	−9.6
Labour	Helen Montgomery	113	2.9	−9.4
Labour	Helen Nance	87	2.2	−7.6
Labour	Mohammad Walid	85	2.2	−5.1
Turnout		3,909	52.18	+7.9
Registered electors		7,491		
Liberal Democrats hold		Swing		
Liberal Democrats hold		Swing		
Liberal Democrats gain from Green		Swing		

=== Hampton ===
Hampton (3 seats)
Party	Candidate	Votes	%	±%
Liberal Democrats	Gareth Roberts*	2,117	53.1	−10.0
Liberal Democrats	Sam Dalton*	2,087	52.3	−9.5
Liberal Democrats	Nick Kennerley	1,967	49.3	−12.8
Conservative	Veronica Barnes	946	23.7	−4.7
Conservative	Derek Jones	915	22.9	−4.8
Conservative	Rody Mager	704	17.6	−9.7
Green	Valentina Butenko	544	13.6	N/A
Reform	Debbie Montague	468	11.7	N/A
Reform	Stuart Wright	447	11.2	N/A
Green	Meera Rajendran	436	10.9	N/A
Green	Lewis Sturdy	410	10.3	N/A
Labour	Caroline Loewenstein	144	3.6	−4.3
Labour	Christopher Fawcett	131	3.3	−3.8
Labour	James Oliva-Hauxwell	109	2.7	−4.3
Turnout		3,990	53.54	+3.8
Registered electors		7,453		
Liberal Democrats hold		Swing		
Liberal Democrats hold		Swing		
Liberal Democrats hold		Swing		

=== Hampton North ===
Hampton North (3 seats)
Party	Candidate	Votes	%	±%
Liberal Democrats	Carey Bishop*	1,767	53.4	N/A
Liberal Democrats	Elizabeth Gant*	1,694	51.2	+1.6
Liberal Democrats	Jeremy Davis*	1,625	49.1	+2.3
Reform	Martin Fraiel	565	17.1	N/A
Reform	Max Hoskinson	548	16.6	N/A
Conservative	Cathy Howe	535	16.2	−19.1
Conservative	Alan Butler	495	15.0	−18.5
Reform	John Yianni	486	14.7	N/A
Conservative	Nupur Majumdar	463	14.0	−15.5
Green	Poppy Robbins	431	13.0	−18.3
Green	Stephen Hancock	359	10.9	N/A
Green	Ayesha Sadiq	343	10.4	N/A
Labour	Lucy Abercrombie	174	5.3	−7.1
Labour	Christopher Johnson	109	3.3	−6.8
Labour	Philip Moshi	98	3.0	−6.4
Turnout		3,308	44.99	−0.5
Registered electors		7,352		
Liberal Democrats hold		Swing		
Liberal Democrats hold		Swing		
Liberal Democrats gain from Conservative		Swing		

=== Hampton Wick and South Teddington ===
Hampton Wick and South Teddington (3 seats)
Party	Candidate	Votes	%	±%
Liberal Democrats	Jim Millard*	2,436	59.2	−3.2
Liberal Democrats	Liz Tadhar	2,267	55.1	−16.0
Liberal Democrats	Helen Baxter	2,104	51.1	−14.9
Conservative	Joe Broughton	818	19.9	−2.8
Green	Magan Singodia	609	14.8	N/A
Green	Wendy Hatto	576	14.0	N/A
Conservative	Tony Fiddes	552	13.4	−7.9
Conservative	Mircea Chisacof	494	12.0	−9.2
Green	Mike Young	460	11.2	N/A
Reform	Edward Davies	440	10.7	N/A
Reform	Michael Mackie	422	10.2	N/A
Labour	Neil Browning	229	5.6	−4.4
Labour	Richard Cheung	195	4.7	−5.0
Labour	Gerard Ward	182	4.4	−4.6
Turnout		4,118	50.71	+1.7
Registered electors		8,121		
Liberal Democrats hold		Swing		
Liberal Democrats hold		Swing		
Liberal Democrats hold		Swing		

=== Heathfield ===
Heathfield (3 seats)
Party	Candidate	Votes	%	±%
Liberal Democrats	Lesley Pollesche*	1,572	48.1	+3.3
Liberal Democrats	John Coombs*	1,568	48.0	−0.8
Liberal Democrats	Michael Wilson*	1,488	45.6	+2.3
Reform	Keith Goodenough	620	19.0	N/A
Reform	Alex Starling	615	18.8	N/A
Reform	Robert Thompson	589	18.0	N/A
Conservative	Fiona Barry	481	14.7	−10.9
Green	Alastair Armstrong	422	12.9	N/A
Conservative	George Dryja	421	12.9	−12.5
Green	Lizzie Curtis	398	12.2	N/A
Conservative	Jonathan Lebosquet	391	12.0	−11.9
Green	Rae Vermeulen	347	10.6	N/A
Labour	Anne Feeney	233	7.1	−19.0
Labour	Liz Mackenzie	192	5.9	−19.8
Labour	Michael McCarthy	181	5.5	−19.4
Turnout		3,266	44.47	+1.8
Registered electors		7,345		
Liberal Democrats hold		Swing		
Liberal Democrats hold		Swing		
Liberal Democrats hold		Swing		

=== Kew ===
Kew (3 seats)
Party	Candidate	Votes	%	±%
Liberal Democrats	Clare Vollum*	2,212	50.7	−7.7
Liberal Democrats	Maureen Goldthorpe	2,112	48.4	−13.9
Liberal Democrats	Kelvin Cheatle	2,108	48.3	−11.5
Conservative	Margaret Buter-Morris	1,157	26.5	−2.2
Conservative	Anthony Blanco	1,109	25.4	−1.8
Conservative	Xandi Steele	890	20.4	−6.7
Green	Geoffrey O'Connell	717	16.4	N/A
Green	Andrew Webster	636	14.6	N/A
Green	Alex Stylianou	604	13.8	N/A
Reform	Glyn Wallis-Jones	416	9.5	N/A
Labour	Ray Ferris	195	4.5	−3.5
Labour	Anousheh Alavi	180	4.1	−3.4
Labour	Barnaby Marder	174	4.0	−2.4
Turnout		4,365	51.29	+3.7
Registered electors		8,510		
Liberal Democrats hold		Swing		
Liberal Democrats hold		Swing		
Liberal Democrats hold		Swing		

=== Mortlake and Barnes Common ===
Mortlake and Barnes Common (3 seats)
Party	Candidate	Votes	%	±%
Liberal Democrats	Geri Cox	1,637	37.5	−8.2
Liberal Democrats	Michael Dingemans	1,464	33.5	N/A
Liberal Democrats	Anton McNulty-Howard*	1,443	33.1	−14.9
Conservative	Clare Delmar	1,065	24.4	−7.3
Conservative	Rhys Thomas	959	22.0	−5.5
Conservative	Peter Vider	890	20.4	−6.4
Green	Seth Ashby-Hawkins	767	17.6	−15.9
Green	Nadia Mirza	656	15.0	N/A
Green	Ciaran Cusack	642	14.7	N/A
Reform	Paisley Arnold	444	10.2	N/A
Reform	John Hughes	408	9.3	N/A
Reform	David White	402	9.2	N/A
Labour	Francine Bates	341	7.8	−10.9
Labour	Lucas Spencer	291	6.7	−7.8
Labour	Matthew Woolston	218	5.0	−8.5
Turnout		4,365	52.04	+4.3
Registered electors		8,387		
Liberal Democrats hold		Swing		
Liberal Democrats hold		Swing		
Liberal Democrats gain from Green		Swing		

=== North Richmond ===
North Richmond (3 seats)
Party	Candidate	Votes	%	±%
Liberal Democrats	Nancy Baldwin*	2,191	59.5	−5.4
Liberal Democrats	Richard Pyne*	1,978	53.7	−7.9
Liberal Democrats	Richard Warren*	1,901	51.6	−9.8
Conservative	Thomas O'Malley	584	15.8	−7.1
Green	Jane Harrison	575	15.6	N/A
Conservative	David Palairet	549	14.9	−6.9
Green	Jenna Kruger	474	12.9	N/A
Green	Dianne Scott	451	12.2	N/A
Reform	Alan Charnley	438	11.9	N/A
Conservative	Amen Bayat	436	11.8	−9.5
No party description	Maggie Richens	376	10.2	N/A
No party description	William Richens	361	9.8	N/A
Labour	Tom Absolon	176	4.8	−7.4
Labour	Fiona O'Farrell	155	4.2	−9.8
Labour	Jonathan Dredge	116	3.1	−8.2
Turnout		3,685	47.90	+1.6
Registered electors		7,693		
Liberal Democrats hold		Swing		
Liberal Democrats hold		Swing		
Liberal Democrats hold		Swing		

=== South Richmond ===
South Richmond (3 seats)
Party	Candidate	Votes	%	±%
Liberal Democrats	Chris Varley*	1,758	45.0	−12.4
Liberal Democrats	Massimo Chiesa	1,727	44.2	N/A
Liberal Democrats	Paulina Vassileva*	1,677	42.9	−13.3
Conservative	Charlie Protheroe	962	24.6	−11.0
Conservative	Phillip Taylor	904	23.1	−5.6
Conservative	Sheba Sogol	857	21.9	−10.3
Green	Paddy Griffith	801	20.5	−26.2
Green	Tanya Williams	583	14.9	N/A
Green	Alexi Hatto	479	12.3	N/A
Reform	Christine Cullis	417	10.7	N/A
Reform	Susan Gamble	410	10.5	N/A
Reform	Candice Schneider	390	10.0	N/A
Labour	Max Davies	168	4.3	−5.1
Labour	Marion White	160	4.1	−3.4
Labour	David McAlpine	152	3.9	−0.9
Turnout		3,907	50.14	+1.7
Registered electors		7,792		
Liberal Democrats hold		Swing		
Liberal Democrats hold		Swing		
Liberal Democrats gain from Green		Swing		

=== South Twickenham ===
South Twickenham (3 seats)
Party	Candidate	Votes	%	±%
Liberal Democrats	Michael Butlin*	2,121	49.4	−13.2
Liberal Democrats	Rhi Lee*	1,995	46.5	−15.3
Liberal Democrats	Jack Clothier Jones	1,974	46.0	N/A
Green	Richard Bennett*	1,333	31.0	−23.5
Green	Gareth Jones	1,054	24.5	N/A
Green	Ross Monaghan	912	21.2	N/A
Conservative	Jane Boulton	630	14.7	−9.1
Conservative	David Marlow	551	12.8	−9.9
Conservative	David Porter	504	11.7	−8.7
Reform	Michael Anstey	395	9.2	N/A
Reform	Robert MacIntyre	375	8.7	N/A
Reform	Ian Nieuwstadt	339	7.9	N/A
Labour	Christina Green	183	4.3	−9.4
Labour	Daniel Freeman	154	3.6	−7.6
Labour	David Goldberg	127	3.0	−6.9
Turnout		4,294	56.99	+6.6
Registered electors		7,534		
Liberal Democrats hold		Swing		
Liberal Democrats hold		Swing		
Liberal Democrats gain from Green		Swing		

=== St Margarets and North Twickenham ===
St Margarets and North Twickenham (3 seats)
Party	Candidate	Votes	%	±%
Liberal Democrats	Katie Mansfield*	2,480	58.7	−12.7
Liberal Democrats	Maria Margiotta	2,311	54.7	−12.8
Liberal Democrats	Alexander Ehmann*	2,264	53.5	−13.4
Green	Milo Clarke	667	15.8	N/A
Green	Sean Anderson	663	15.7	N/A
Conservative	Elizabeth Hill	630	14.9	−1.6
Green	Richard Clemence	617	14.6	N/A
Conservative	Brian Jarvis	532	12.6	−3.0
Conservative	Nathaniel Ikeazor	508	12.0	−3.4
Reform	Pearse Bates	374	8.8	N/A
Reform	Peter Crooks	358	8.5	N/A
Reform	Paul Grindrod	352	8.3	N/A
Labour	Sandra Roberts	234	5.5	−5.4
Labour	Christopher George	229	5.4	−4.6
Labour	Howard Roberts	182	4.3	−4.8
Turnout		4,228	50.34	+2.9
Registered electors		8,399		
Liberal Democrats hold		Swing		
Liberal Democrats hold		Swing		
Liberal Democrats hold		Swing		

=== Teddington ===
Teddington (3 seats)
Party	Candidate	Votes	%	±%
Liberal Democrats	Richard Baker*	2,613	59.4	−7.6
Liberal Democrats	Charlie Engel*	2,539	57.7	−9.5
Liberal Democrats	Phil Giesler*	2,435	55.4	−9.4
Green	Ken Denaro	683	15.5	N/A
Conservative	Jon Hollis	625	14.2	−7.6
Conservative	Elizabeth Dolan	568	12.9	−8.5
Green	Phulmaya Bhusal	558	12.7	N/A
Green	Eddie Thorne	515	11.7	N/A
Conservative	James Lloyd-Thomas	496	11.3	−9.4
Reform	Julian Allbut	442	10.1	N/A
Reform	Kay Brooks	407	9.3	N/A
Reform	Mark Vellacott	387	8.8	N/A
Labour	Particia Tivendale	208	4.7	−6.8
Labour	James Thomson	192	4.4	−6.7
Labour	Sampson Low	187	4.3	−4.8
Turnout		4,397	54.11	+4.8
Registered electors		8,126		
Liberal Democrats hold		Swing		
Liberal Democrats hold		Swing		
Liberal Democrats hold		Swing		

=== Twickenham Riverside ===
Twickenham Riverside (3 seats)
Party	Candidate	Votes	%	±%
Liberal Democrats	James Chard*	2,299	56.3	−5.1
Liberal Democrats	Julia Neden-Watts*	2,221	54.4	−11.0
Liberal Democrats	Andrew Duncan	2,051	50.2	−7.6
Green	Maggie Brown	833	20.4	N/A
Conservative	Maria Barry	698	17.1	−6.1
Conservative	Adrian Johnston	680	16.7	−3.2
Conservative	David Sparrow	602	14.7	−4.1
Green	Steve Roest	574	14.1	N/A
Green	Merhala Selvarajah	542	13.3	N/A
Reform	Martin Bergin	363	8.9	N/A
Reform	Oliver Needs	340	8.3	N/A
Labour	Sabrina Fuller	226	5.5	−4.7
Labour	Liam Humble	192	4.7	−3.5
Labour	Edward Sherwood	155	3.8	−4.1
Turnout		4,082	50.43	+3.3
Registered electors		8,094		
Liberal Democrats hold		Swing		
Liberal Democrats hold		Swing		
Liberal Democrats hold		Swing		

=== West Twickenham ===
West Twickenham (3 seats)
Party	Candidate	Votes	%	±%
Liberal Democrats	Piers Allen*	2,210	56.7	−5.5
Liberal Democrats	Rachel Robertson	2,123	54.5	−7.5
Liberal Democrats	Alan Juriansz*	2,026	52.0	−7.6
Green	Rosalie Callway	711	18.3	N/A
Green	Surya Cooper	567	14.6	N/A
Conservative	Fiona Brannon	521	13.4	−10.7
Green	Paul Healy	493	12.7	N/A
Reform	George McQueen	492	12.6	N/A
Reform	Gabrielle Koukis	484	12.4	N/A
Reform	Richard Lailey	483	12.4	N/A
Conservative	Neil Wynn-Jones	446	11.5	−12.2
Conservative	Zahra Khan	418	10.7	−12.3
Labour	Oliver Freeman	175	4.5	−9.3
Labour	Adam Gladstone	145	3.7	−8.2
Labour	Stephen Guichard	135	3.5	−5.7
Turnout		3,895	49.22	+3.8
Registered electors		7,914		
Liberal Democrats hold		Swing		
Liberal Democrats hold		Swing		
Liberal Democrats hold		Swing		

=== Whitton ===
Whitton (3 seats)
Party	Candidate	Votes	%	±%
Liberal Democrats	Jo Humphreys*	1,933	50.4	−14.6
Liberal Democrats	Nathaniel MacDonald	1,756	45.8	−14.3
Liberal Democrats	Kuldev Sehra*	1,742	45.4	−11.4
Reform	Peter Dombi	666	17.4	N/A
Reform	Stephen Pulfrey	640	16.7	N/A
Conservative	Max Balfour	580	15.1	−13.4
Reform	Nicolas Silkov-Yianni	558	14.5	N/A
Conservative	David Bradshaw	547	14.3	−9.4
Green	Keith Buckman	534	13.9	N/A
Conservative	Elizabeth Foster	525	13.7	−9.7
Green	Niall Fahey	492	12.8	N/A
Green	Qudsia Shah	465	12.1	N/A
Labour	Syed Ahmed	254	6.6	−4.3
Labour	David Eckert	252	6.6	−3.6
Labour	Pam Marum	216	5.6	−3.4
Turnout		3,838	50.04	+2.2
Registered electors		7,670		
Liberal Democrats hold		Swing		
Liberal Democrats hold		Swing		
Liberal Democrats hold		Swing		
