= 2002 Richmond upon Thames London Borough Council election =

2002 English local election

- 2 May 2002

All 54 seats up for election to Richmond upon Thames London Borough Council 28 seats needed for a majority
- Registered: 130,077
- Turnout: 51,870, 39.88% (▼5.15)

	First party	Second party	Third party
Leader	Tony Arbour	Serge Lourie	Unknown
Party	Conservative	Liberal Democrats	Labour
Leader since	1996	22 May 2001	Unknown
Leader's seat	Hampton Wick	Kew	Unknown
Last election	14 seats, 36.20%	34 seats, 43.01%	4 seats, 20.47%
Seats won	39	15	0
Seat change	▲25	▼19	▼4
Popular vote	67,582	53,763	20,518
Percentage	45.75%	36.40%	13.89%
Swing	▲9.55	▼6.61	▼6.58
Council control before election
Liberal Democrats
Council control after election
Conservative

Elections to Southwark Council were held in May 2002, in which the whole council was up for election. Turnout for the election was 39.88%.

== Background ==
As part of regularly scheduled redistricting taking place within several London councils at the time, Richmon Upon Thames council redrew the boundaries between existing wards, eliminated some, increased the size of others as well as creating new wards. As part of this redistricting Richmond upon Thames London Borough Council added 2 more seats, bringing the councils total number of seats from 52 to 54.

=== Ward Changes ===
==== Wards Created ====
- Fulwell and Hampton Hill (3)
- Ham, Petersham and Richmond Riverside (3)
- Hampton North (3)
- Mortlake and Barnes Common (3)
- North Richmond (3)
- St Margarets and North Twickenham (3)
- South Richmond (3)
- Twickenham Riverside (3)

==== Wards Eliminated ====
- Central Twickenham (2)
- East Twickenham (3)
- Ham and Petersham (3)
- Hampton Hill (3)
- Hampton Nursery (3)
- Mortlake (3)
- Palewell (3)
- Richmond Hill (3)
- Richmond Town (2)

==== Wards Expanded ====
- East Sheen - increased from 2 seats to 3
- West Twickenham - increased from 2 seats to 3

=== Council Composition ===
In the years between the last election and this one there was only one by-election to replace a councillor who resigned from their seat, however the seat was retained by the Conservative Party. This mean that the composition of the council just before the election was as follows:

↓
4	34	14
Labour	Lib Dem	Conservative

== Election result ==
2002 Richmond Upon Thames London Borough Council local election results
Party	Seats	Gains	Losses	Net gain/loss	Seats %	Votes %	Votes	+/−
Conservative	39	30	5	▲25	72.22	45.75	67,582	▲9.55
Liberal Democrats	15	6	25	▼19	27.78	36.40	53,763	▼6.61
Labour	0	0	4	▼4	0.00	13.89	20,518	▼6.58
Green	0	0	0	Steady	0.00	2.63	3,882	New
Independent	0	0	0	Steady	0.00	1.25	1,846	New
UKIP	0	0	0	Steady	0.00	0.08	123	New
Total	54						147,714	

The election was a major victory for the Conservative party, taking nearly 3/4 of all the seats on the council, pushing the Liberal Democrats out of power and regaining control of the council for the first time since they lost overall control in 1982. Labour lost all of the councillors they had on the council, which left the composition of the council looking like this:

↓
15	39
Lib Dem	Conservative

== Ward results ==
(*) - Indicates an incumbent candidate

(†) - Indicates an incumbent candidate standing in a different ward

=== Barnes ===
Barnes (3)
Party	Candidate	Votes	%	±%
Conservative	John Ross	1,464	50.6	
Conservative	Christine Percival	1,444	49.9	
Conservative	John Yandle	1,427	49.3	
Liberal Democrats	Catharine Gent*	1,221	42.2	
Liberal Democrats	Barbara Westmorland*	1,140	39.4	
Liberal Democrats	Paul Dare	1,094	37.8	
Labour	Ann Neimer	220	7.6	
Labour	Barbara Underwood	209	7.2	
Labour	Ronald Lumborg	200	6.9	
Registered electors		7,076		▲45
Turnout		2,905	41.05	▼8.96
Rejected ballots		11	0.38	▼0.08
Conservative win (new boundaries)				
Conservative win (new boundaries)				
Conservative win (new boundaries)				

=== East Sheen ===
East Sheen (3)
Party	Candidate	Votes	%	±%
Conservative	Nicholas True*	1,697	54.6	
Conservative	Virginia Morris	1,684	54.2	
Conservative	Nicola Urquhart^{†} (Note: Urquhart was a sitting councillor representing the now defunct Palewell ward. She was elected in a by-election triggered by the resignation of Cllr. Helen Blake in 1999)	1,651	53.1	
Liberal Democrats	Ida Hennessy	792	25.5	
Liberal Democrats	Philip Morris	768	24.7	
Liberal Democrats	Jennifer Smith	726	23.4	
Green	Sylvia Wills	314	10.1	
Green	James Page	295	9.5	
Green	Sylvia Levi	284	9.1	
Labour	Jane McVeigh	245	7.9	
Labour	Ragna Garlake	207	6.7	
Labour	Derek Somers	198	6.4	
Registered electors		7,069		▲2,286
Turnout		3,115	44.07	▼2.11
Rejected ballots		7	0.22	▲0.04
Conservative win (new boundaries)				
Conservative win (new boundaries)				
Conservative win (new seat)				

=== Fulwell and Hampton Hill ===
Fullwell and Hampton Hill (3)
Party	Candidate	Votes	%	±%
Liberal Democrats	Malcolm Eady	1,080	40.8	
Liberal Democrats	Jeremy Elloy	1,068	40.4	
Conservative	Sallie Colak-Antic	1,000	37.8	
Conservative	Stuart Leamy	992	37.5	
Conservative	Janice Dorn	961	36.3	
Liberal Democrats	Andrew Reeves	895	33.8	
Green	Monica Saunders	409	15.5	
Labour	Peter Anderson	375	14.2	
Labour	Samuel Rosenthal	362	13.7	
Labour	Gurdip S. Kalsi	320	12.1	
Independent	Jonathan Wainwright	241	9.1	
Registered electors		7,113		New
Turnout		2,654	37.31	New
Rejected ballots		9	0.34	New
Liberal Democrats win (new seat)				
Liberal Democrats win (new seat)				
Conservative win (new seat)				

=== Ham, Petersham ajnd Richmond Riverside ===
Ham, Petersham and Richmond Riverside (3)
Party	Candidate	Votes	%	±%
Liberal Democrats	Susan Jones^{†} (Note: Jones, Williams and Miller were all sitting councillors representing the now defunct Ham and Petersham ward)	1,401	48.1	
Liberal Democrats	David Williams^{†}	1,294	44.4	
Liberal Democrats	Brian Miller^{†}	1,291	44.3	
Conservative	David Sparrow	918	31.5	
Conservative	Pamela Fleming	907	31.1	
Conservative	Ronald Fleming	898	30.8	
Independent	Richard Meacock	370	12.7	
Independent	John Perry	314	10.8	
Independent	Teresa Vanneck-Surplice	295	10.1	
Labour	Frank Cooper	243	8.3	
Labour	Pamela Risner	232	8.0	
Labour	Carole Tonkinson	223	7.7	
Registered electors		7,048		New
Turnout		2,920	41.43	New
Rejected ballots		8	0.27	New
Liberal Democrats win (new seat)				
Liberal Democrats win (new seat)				
Liberal Democrats win (new seat)				

=== Hampton ===
Hampton (3)
Party	Candidate	Votes	%	±%
Conservative	Mark Kreling^{†} (Note: Kreling was a sitting councillor representing the now defunct Hampton Hill ward)	1,480	49.6	
Conservative	Jean Matthews*	1,479	49.6	
Conservative	David Young	1,441	48.3	
Liberal Democrats	Bryan Woodriff*	1,196	40.1	
Liberal Democrats	Maureen Woodriff^{†} (Note: Woodriff was a sitting councillor representing the now defunct Hampton Nursery ward)	1,078	36.1	
Liberal Democrats	Elaine Keevil	1,053	35.3	
Labour	Carmela Carrier	347	11.6	
Labour	Harold Mackinlay	279	9.3	
Labour	Janet Fraser	273	9.1	
Registered electors		7,185		▲427
Turnout		2,996	41.70	▼2.87
Rejected ballots		12	0.40	▼0.06
Conservative win (new boundaries)				
Conservative win (new boundaries)				
Conservative win (new boundaries)				

=== Hampton North ===
Hampton North (3)
Party	Candidate	Votes	%	±%
Conservative	Max Hoskinson	1,498	51.3	
Conservative	Geoffrey Samuel^{†} (Note: Samuel was a sitting councillor representing the now defunct Hampton Hill ward)	1,485	50.8	
Conservative	Hilary Smith	1,387	47.5	
Liberal Democrats	Raymond Ball	1,026	35.1	
Liberal Democrats	Jonathan Cardy^{†} (Note: Cardy was a sitting councillor representing the now defunct Hampton Nursery ward)	992	34.0	
Liberal Democrats	Elizabeth Doocey	977	33.4	
Labour	Sean Beatty	364	12.5	
Labour	Louisa Spawls	344	11.8	
Labour	Idwal Morgan	325	11.1	
Registered electors		6,928		New
Turnout		2,927	42.25	New
Rejected ballots		6	0.20	New
Conservative win (new seat)				
Conservative win (new seat)				
Conservative win (new seat)				

=== Hampton Wick ===
Hampton Wick (3)
Party	Candidate	Votes	%	±%
Conservative	Tony Arbour*	1,621	59.0	
Conservative	Elizabeth Parsons*	1,484	54.0	
Conservative	Roger Avins	1,476	53.7	
Liberal Democrats	Guy Allen	741	27.0	
Liberal Democrats	Thomas Dobrashian	693	25.2	
Liberal Democrats	Arthur Jacob	636	23.1	
Green	Michael Bangham	370	13.5	
Labour	Eva Tutchell	297	10.8	
Labour	Derek Tutchell	278	10.1	
Labour	Caroline Loewenstein	275	10.0	
Registered electors		6,905		▼766
Turnout		2,755	39.90	▼6.44
Rejected ballots		6	0.22	▼0.06
Conservative win (new boundaries)				
Conservative win (new boundaries)				
Conservative win (new boundaries)				

=== Heathfield ===
Heathfield (3)
Party	Candidate	Votes	%	±%
Liberal Democrats	Robert King*	1,161	46.2	
Liberal Democrats	John Coombs	1,116	44.4	
Liberal Democrats	William Treble*	1,057	42.0	
Conservative	Terence Pearce	1,022	40.6	
Conservative	Gillian Garrow	1,017	40.4	
Conservative	Charles Suren	966	38.4	
Labour	John Reekie	309	12.3	
Labour	Geoffrey Freitag	306	12.2	
Labour	Julia Sutherland	281	11.2	
Registered electors		6,908		▼544
Turnout		2,522	36.51	▼3.63
Rejected ballots		7	0.28	▼0.02
Liberal Democrats win (new boundaries)				
Liberal Democrats win (new boundaries)				
Liberal Democrats win (new boundaries)				

=== Kew ===
Kew (3)
Party	Candidate	Votes	%	±%
Conservative	Robin Jowit	1,391	45.0	
Liberal Democrats	Serge Lourie*	1,339	43.3	
Liberal Democrats	Anthony Barnett*	1,330	43.0	
Conservative	Emma Winsor-Cundell	1,327	42.9	
Conservative	Andrew James	1,314	42.5	
Liberal Democrats	Ian Hunter	1,252	40.5	
Labour	Margaret Robson	357	11.5	
Labour	John Fowler	341	11.0	
Labour	David Butler	303	9.8	
Registered electors		7,130		▼378
Turnout		3,100	43.48	▼3.42
Rejected ballots		7	0.23	▲0.14
Conservative win (new boundaries)				
Liberal Democrats win (new boundaries)				
Liberal Democrats win (new boundaries)				

=== Mortlake and Barnes Common ===
Mortlake and Barnes Common (3)
Party	Candidate	Votes	%	±%
Conservative	Carolyn Hoy	1,112	39.2	
Conservative	Malcom McAllister	1,098	38.7	
Conservative	John Saunders	1,081	38.1	
Liberal Democrats	Eleanor Stanier^{†} (Note: Stanier, Langford and Matthews were all sitting councillor representing the now defunct Mortlake ward)	850	30.0	
Liberal Democrats	Margaret Saunders	838	29.5	
Labour	Barry Langford^{†}	823	29.0	
Labour	Brian Matthews^{†}	814	28.7	
Liberal Democrats	Marco Martinez	792	27.9	
Labour	Barnaby Marder	756	26.6	
Registered electors		7,684		New
Turnout		2,848	37.06	New
Rejected ballots		11	0.39	New
Conservative win (new seat)				
Conservative win (new seat)				
Conservative win (new seat)				

=== North Richmond ===
North Richmond (3)
Party	Candidate	Votes	%	±%
Conservative	Phillip Taylor	1,335	46.1	
Conservative	Marc Cranfield-Adams	1,313	45.3	
Conservative	Anthony Tresigne	1,279	44.2	
Liberal Democrats	Alison Cornish^{†} (Note: Cornish and Carthew were both sitting councillors representing the now defunct Richmond Town ward)	1,129	39.0	
Liberal Democrats	Nicholas Carthew^{†}	1,059	36.6	
Liberal Democrats	Celia Hodges	1,004	34.7	
Labour	John Ward	317	10.9	
Labour	Maureen Metzger	313	10.8	
Labour	Judith Enright	312	10.8	
Independent	Raymond Perrin	145	5.0	
UKIP	Jeremy Shadbolt	123	4.2	
Registered electors		7,470		New
Turnout		2,897	38.78	New
Rejected ballots		1	0.03	New
Conservative win (new seat)				
Conservative win (new seat)				
Conservative win (new seat)				

=== St Margarets and North Twickenham ===
St Margarets and North Twickenham (3)
Party	Candidate	Votes	%	±%
Conservative	Annie Hambidge	1,180	37.2	
Conservative	David Porter^{†} (Note: Both Porter and Lamb were incumbent councillors representing the Central Twickenham ward)	1,138	35.8	
Conservative	Simon Lamb^{†}	1,118	35.2	
Liberal Democrats	Harbrinder Khosa	977	30.8	
Liberal Democrats	Philip Morgan	960	30.2	
Liberal Democrats	John Whitall	949	29.9	
Green	Judy Maciejowska	579	18.2	
Labour	Feola Choat	564	17.8	
Labour	Dean Rogers	539	17.0	
Labour	Benjamin Rowland	476	15.0	
Green	Kate Stephenson	439	13.8	
Green	Richard Porter	401	12.6	
Registered electors		7,615		New
Turnout		3,182	41.79	New
Rejected ballots		6	0.19	New
Conservative win (new seat)				
Conservative win (new seat)				
Conservative win (new seat)				

=== South Richmond ===
South Richmond (3)
Party	Candidate	Votes	%	±%
Conservative	Frances Bouchier	1,322	45.7	
Conservative	Rodney Bennett	1,305	45.1	
Conservative	Carolann van Dinter	1,232	42.6	
Liberal Democrats	Penelope Lee^{†} (Note: Lee was a sitting councillor representing the now defunct Richmond Hill ward)	1,121	38.8	
Liberal Democrats	Josephine Summers^{†} (Note: Summers was a sitting councillor representing the now defunct Palewell ward)	1,061	36.7	
Liberal Democrats	Peter Talbot	1,002	34.6	
Labour	Alan Laird	355	12.3	
Green	Rachael Douglas	326	11.3	
Green	John Norris	242	8.4	
Green	Fred Lightfoot	223	7.7	
Registered electors		7,633		New
Turnout		2,897	37.95	New
Rejected ballots		5	0.17	New
Conservative win (new seat)				
Conservative win (new seat)				
Conservative win (new seat)				

=== South Twickenham ===
South Twickenham (3)
Party	Candidate	Votes	%	±%
Conservative	Douglas Orchard*	1,185	44.5	
Conservative	David Marlow	1,139	42.8	
Conservative	Clare Head	1,127	42.3	
Liberal Democrats	Mark Pope	790	29.7	
Liberal Democrats	Gillian Cheeseman	725	27.2	
Liberal Democrats	Steven Topol	678	25.5	
Labour	Colin Pearson	495	18.6	
Independent	John Armstrong	481	18.1	
Labour	Martin Stearman	477	17.9	
Labour	Jenifer Wyatt	466	17.5	
Registered electors		7,318		▼181
Turnout		2,670	36.49	▼10.49
Rejected ballots		8	0.30	▲0.04
Conservative win (new boundaries)				
Conservative win (new boundaries)				
Conservative win (new boundaries)				

=== Teddington ===
Teddington (3)
Party	Candidate	Votes	%	±%
Liberal Democrats	James Mumford*	1,344	47.7	
Liberal Democrats	Martin Elengorn*	1,324	47.0	
Liberal Democrats	Stephen Knight*	1,274	45.2	
Conservative	Peter Temlett	1,075	38.1	
Conservative	June Cape	1,036	36.8	
Conservative	Kevin Ross	1,003	35.6	
Labour	Nuala Orton	403	14.3	
Labour	Penelope Banaji	398	14.1	
Labour	Sampson Low	365	12.9	
Registered electors		7,401		▼243
Turnout		2,825	38.17	▼5.04
Rejected ballots		6	0.21	▼0.46
Liberal Democrats win (new boundaries)				
Liberal Democrats win (new boundaries)				
Liberal Democrats win (new boundaries)				

=== Twickenham Riverside ===
Twickenham Riverside (3)
Party	Candidate	Votes	%	±%
Conservative	Derek Beattie	1,079	42.1	
Conservative	Helen Boulton	1,064	41.5	
Liberal Democrats	Mary Carr	1,055	41.1	
Conservative	Gloria Cadet	1,041	40.6	
Liberal Democrats	Piers Allen	1,010	39.4	
Liberal Democrats	Alan Mackinney	986	38.4	
Labour	John Grant	461	18.0	
Labour	Percy Gourgey	425	16.6	
Labour	Julia Hathaway	416	16.2	
Registered electors		7,353		▼291
Turnout		2,597	35.32	▼7.89
Rejected ballots		32	1.23	▲0.56
Conservative win (new seat)				
Conservative win (new seat)				
Liberal Democrats win (new seat)				

=== West Twickenham ===
West Twickenham (3)
Party	Candidate	Votes	%	±%
Conservative	Lance Quantrill	1,321	46.9	
Conservative	Alan Butler^{†} (Note: Butler was a sitting councillor representing the South Twickenham ward)	1,318	46.8	
Conservative	Richard Hollis	1,317	46.8	
Labour	Michael Gold*	949	33.7	
Labour	Graham Nixon	860	30.6	
Labour	Ian Thomson	804	28.6	
Liberal Democrats	Martin Gould	532	18.9	
Liberal Democrats	Nigel Cook	526	18.7	
Liberal Democrats	Alan Juriansz	490	17.4	
Registered electors		7,305		▲2,508
Turnout		2,832	38.77	▼5.36
Rejected ballots		18	0.64	▲0.50
Conservative win (new boundaries)				
Conservative win (new boundaries)				
Conservative win (new seat)				

=== Whitton ===
Whitton (3)
Party	Candidate	Votes	%	±%
Conservative	Hilary Dance	1,443	44.8	
Liberal Democrats	Georgina Mackinney*	1,392	43.2	
Conservative	Michael Morley	1,386	43.0	
Liberal Democrats	Keith Mackinney*	1,377	42.7	
Conservative	Patricia Pipe	1,374	42.6	
Liberal Democrats	Keith Warren*	1,353	42.0	
Labour	Jacqueline Morgan	346	10.7	
Labour	Howard Marchant	336	10.4	
Labour	Stephen Guichard	335	10.4	
Registered electors		6,936		▼171
Turnout		3,228	46.54	▼0.86
Rejected ballots		6	0.19	▼0.37
Conservative win (new boundaries)				
Liberal Democrats win (new boundaries)				
Conservative win (new boundaries)				

== By-elections ==
Mortlake and Barnes Common by-election, 7 August 2003
Party	Candidate	Votes	%	±%
Liberal Democrats	Eleanor Stanier	936	44.5	
Conservative	Jane West	927	44.0	
Labour	Benjamin Rowland	132	6.3	
Green	James Page	109	5.2	
Majority		9	0.4	
Turnout		2,108	30.3	
Rejected ballots		4	0.2	
Liberal Democrats gain from Conservative				

The by-election was called following the death of Cllr. John Saunders

Kew by-election, 18 December 2003
Party	Candidate	Votes	%	±%
Liberal Democrats	Jane Arneil	1,722	54.7	
Conservative	Ewan Wallace	1,235	39.3	
Green	Sylvia Levi	104	3.3	
Labour	John Fowler	85	2.7	
Majority		487	15.4	
Turnout		3,149	46.6	
Rejected ballots		3	0.10	
Liberal Democrats hold				

The by-election was called following the death of Cllr. Anthony Barnett

Hampton by-election, 7 October 2004
Party	Candidate	Votes	%	±%
Liberal Democrats	Suzette Nicholson	1,669	57.9	
Conservative	Stuart Leamy	1,111	38.6	
Labour	Kanbar Hosseinbor	101	3.5	
Majority		558	19.3	
Turnout		2,894	42.0	
Rejected ballots		13	0.5	
Liberal Democrats gain from Conservative				

The by-election was called following the death of Cllr Jean Matthews

North Richmond by-election, 27 January 2005
Party	Candidate	Votes	%	±%
Liberal Democrats	Celia Hodges	1,384	51.9	
Conservative	Paul Hodgins	1,043	39.1	
Labour	Barnaby Marder	129	4.9	
Green	Sylvia Wills	110	4.1	
Majority		341	12.8	
Turnout		2,672	39.6	
Rejected ballots		6	0.22	
Liberal Democrats gain from Conservative				

The by-election was called following the resignation of Cllr. Marc Cranfield-Adams

Twickenham Riverside by-election, 5 May 2005
Party	Candidate	Votes	%	±%
Liberal Democrats	David Trigg	2,111	45.8	
Conservative	Nicholas Lait	1,513	32.8	
Labour	John Grant	548	11.9	
Green	Henry Gower	435	9.5	
Majority		598	13.0	
Turnout		4,635		
Rejected ballots		28	0.60	
Liberal Democrats gain from Conservative				

The by-election was called following the death of Cllr. Derek Beatie
