= 1998 Richmond upon Thames London Borough Council election =

Local election in England

- 7 May 1998

All 52 seats up for election to Richmond upon Thames London Borough Council 27 seats needed for a majority
- Registered: 124,207
- Turnout: 55,933, 45.03% (▼10.55)

	First party	Second party	Third party
Leader	David R. Williams	Tony Arbour	Unknown
Party	Liberal Democrats	Conservative	Labour
Leader since	3 Mar 1988	1996	Unknown
Leader's seat	Ham and Petersham	Hampton Wick	Unknown
Last election	43 seats, 46.78%	7 seats, 35.24%	2 seats, 17.91%
Seats before	43	5	2
Seats won	34	14	4
Seat change	▼10	▲7	▲2
Popular vote	64,273	54,090	30,585
Percentage	43.01%	36.20%	20.47%
Swing	▼3.77	▲0.96	▲2.56
Council control before election
Liberal Democrats
Council control after election
Liberal Democrats

The 1998 Richmond upon Thames Council election took place on 7 May 1998 to elect members of Richmond upon Thames London Borough Council in London, England. The whole council was up for election and the Liberal Democrats stayed in overall control of the council.

== Background ==
In between the 1994 election and this election there were a total of 4 by-elections to replace councillors who resigned from their seats, 2 of which resulted in seats changing hands. However as these 2 seats changing hands were from Conservative to Lib Dem and from Lib Dem to Conservative there was no change in the composition of the council as a result of this. The only other change in between these elections were 2 Conservative Party seats that became vacant just before the election without enough time to hold a separate by-election to fill them. As a result of this the composition of the council just before the election was as follows:

↓
2	43	5	2
Labour	Liberal Democrats	Conservative	Vacant

== Election results ==
1998 Richmond upon Thames London Borough Council elections
Party	Seats	Gains	Losses	Net gain/loss	Seats %	Votes %	Votes	+/−
Liberal Democrats	34	1	10	▼9	62.96	43.01	64,273	▼3.77
Conservative	14	8	1	▲7	26.92	36.20	54,090	▲0.96
Labour	4	2	0	▲2	7.69	20.47	30,585	▲2.56
Ind. Residents	0	0	0	Steady	0.00	0.27	403	New
Socialist Labour	0	0	0	Steady	0.00	0.05	70	New
Total	52						149,421	

After the election the composition of the council was as follows:

↓
4	34	14
Labour	Liberal Democrats	Conservative

== Ward results ==
(*) - Indicates an incumbent candidate

(†) - Indicates an incumbent candidate standing in a different ward

=== Barnes ===
Barnes (3)
Party	Candidate	Votes	%	±%
Liberal Democrats	Catharine Gent*	1,722	48.65	▼0.24
Liberal Democrats	Barbara Westmorland*	1,616		
Liberal Democrats	Angela Style*	1,584		
Conservative	John Yandle	1,430	41.48	▲0.76
Conservative	John Ross	1,406		
Conservative	Michael Burton-Prateley	1,361		
Labour	Laurence Frisby	356	9.87	▼0.52
Labour	Ann Neimer	346		
Labour	Ronald Lumborg	297		
Registered electors		7,031		▲726
Turnout		3,516	50.01	▼10.67
Rejected ballots		16	0.46	▲0.33
Liberal Democrats hold				
Liberal Democrats hold				
Liberal Democrats hold				

=== Central Twickenham ===
Central Twickenham (2)
Party	Candidate	Votes	%	±%
Conservative	David Porter	937	35.93	▼3.03
Conservative	Simon Lamb	927		
Liberal Democrats	John Coombs* (Note: Coombs was elected in a by-election triggered by the resignation of Cllr Philip Northey in 1996)	894	33.71	▼2.90
Liberal Democrats	Carol Golder	855		
Labour	Graham Nixon	810	30.36	▲5.93
Labour	Dean Rogers	765		
Registered electors		5,655		▲665
Turnout		2,718	48.06	▼7.65
Rejected ballots		17	0.63	▲0.52
Conservative hold				
Conservative gain from Liberal Democrats				

=== East Sheen ===
East Sheen (2)
Party	Candidate	Votes	%	±%
Conservative	Nicholas True	1,167	53.96	▲2.75
Conservative	Maria Flemington	1,128		
Liberal Democrats	Philip Morris	700	32.80	▼5.78
Liberal Democrats	Raymond Perrin	695		
Labour	Penelope Curtis	299	13.24	▲3.03
Labour	John Fowler	264		
Registered electors		4,783		▲449
Turnout		2,209	46.18	▼14.57
Rejected ballots		4	0.18	▼0.12
Conservative hold				
Conservative hold				

=== East Twickenham ===
East Twickenham (3)
Party	Candidate	Votes	%	±%
Liberal Democrats	Laurence Mann*	1,595	45.99	▲0.17
Liberal Democrats	David Cornwell*	1,558		
Liberal Democrats	John Whittall	1,475		
Labour	Feola Choat	1,056	29.42	▲2.86
Labour	Agostino De Marco	974		
Labour	Ian Rapley	931		
Conservative	Pamela Poyser	842	24.59	▼3.03
Conservative	David Chamberlain	826		
Conservative	Therese Sparrow	807		
Registered electors		8,815		▲701
Turnout		3,509	39.81	▼13.79
Rejected ballots		21	0.60	▲0.46
Liberal Democrats hold				
Liberal Democrats hold				
Liberal Democrats hold				

=== Ham and Petersham ===
Ham and Petersham (3)
Party	Candidate	Votes	%	±%
Liberal Democrats	Susan Jones*	1,528	58.10	▼1.61
Liberal Democrats	David Williams*	1,487		
Liberal Democrats	Brian Miller^{†} (Note: Miller was a sitting councillor representing the Richmond Hill ward)	1,437		
Conservative	David Sparrow	735	28.20	▲1.93
Conservative	Ronald Proctor	725		
Conservative	Derek Britto	701		
Labour	Audrey Hunt	382	13.70	▲0.32
Labour	Pamela Risner	340		
Labour	Derek Somers	328		
Registered electors		5,952		▲158
Turnout		2,697	45.31	▼12.99
Rejected ballots		12	0.44	▲0.32
Liberal Democrats hold				
Liberal Democrats hold				
Liberal Democrats hold				

=== Hampton ===
Hampton (3)
Party	Candidate	Votes	%	±%
Conservative	Anne Woodward	1,287	43.54	▲8.58
Conservative	Jean Matthews	1,227		
Liberal Democrats	Bryan Woodriff*	1,225	40.10	▼8.31
Conservative	Richard Mundy	1,215		
Liberal Democrats	Marshall Lees^{†} (Note: Lees was a sitting councillor representing the Hampton ward)	1,109		
Liberal Democrats	Sandra Fayle	1,101		
Labour	Christine Cross	492	16.36	▼0.27
Labour	Camela Carrier	463		
Labour	Louisa Spawls	446		
Registered electors		6,758		▲325
Turnout		3,012	44.57	▼8.38
Rejected ballots		14	0.46	▲0.23
Conservative gain from Liberal Democrats				
Conservative gain from Liberal Democrats				
Liberal Democrats hold				

=== Hampton Hill ===
Hampton Hill (3)
Party	Candidate	Votes	%	±%
Conservative	Geoffrey Samuel* (Note: Samuel was elected in a by-election triggered by the resignation of Cllr David Martin in 1996)	1,390	41.51	▲1.44
Liberal Democrats	Barbara Alexander*	1,379	39.97	▼2.21
Conservative	Mark Kreling	1,361		
Conservative	Patricia Pipe	1,340		
Liberal Democrats	John Gossage	1,327		
Liberal Democrats	Geoffrey Stone	1,233		
Labour	Brian Firth	639	18.52	▲0.77
Labour	Roger Goodier	615		
Labour	Kevin Gilligan	571		
Registered electors		6,811		▲150
Turnout		3,413	50.11	▼6.12
Rejected ballots		8	0.23	▲0.01
Conservative gain from Liberal Democrats				
Liberal Democrats gain from Conservative				
Conservative hold				

=== Hampton Nursery ===
Hampton Nursery (2)
Party	Candidate	Votes	%	±%
Liberal Democrats	Maureen Woodriff*	745	41.21	▼6.70
Liberal Democrats	Jonathan Cardy	662		
Conservative	Margaret Williams	586	34.01	▲3.19
Conservative	June Cape	575		
Labour	Sean Beaty	450	24.78	▲3.51
Labour	Muhammad Yusuf	396		
Registered electors		5,019		▲210
Turnout		1,830	36.46	▼11.57
Rejected ballots		10	0.55	▲0.33
Liberal Democrats hold				
Liberal Democrats hold				

=== Hampton Wick ===
Hampton Wick (3)
Party	Candidate	Votes	%	±%
Conservative	Tony Arbour*	1,600	43.89	▲3.42
Liberal Democrats	Gita Rae*	1,477	41.51	▼0.71
Conservative	Elizabeth Parsons	1,446		
Conservative	Bradley Rogers	1,385		
Liberal Democrats	Jane Tresise	1,369		
Liberal Democrats	Malcom McDougall*	1,344		
Labour	Harold Mackinlay	527	14.60	▼2.71
Labour	Derek Tutchell	482		
Labour	Jenifer Wyatt	465		
Registered electors		7,671		▲431
Turnout		3,555	46.34	▼5.27
Rejected ballots		10	0.28	▲0.12
Conservative gain from Liberal Democrats				
Liberal Democrats hold				
Conservative hold				

=== Heathfield ===
Heathfield (3)
Party	Candidate	Votes	%	±%
Liberal Democrats	Robert King*	1,315	44.43	▼4.65
Liberal Democrats	Michael Jones*	1,255		
Liberal Democrats	William Treble	1,174		
Conservative	Brian Miles	961	33.20	▼0.17
Conservative	Kevin Ross	935		
Conservative	Stuart Leamy	902		
Labour	Stephen Hanlon	646	22.37	▲4.82
Labour	Stephen Guichard	631		
Labour	Howard Marchant	608		
Registered electors		7,452		▲291
Turnout		2,991	40.14	▼15.01
Rejected ballots		9	0.30	▲0.10
Liberal Democrats hold				
Liberal Democrats hold				
Liberal Democrats hold				

=== Kew ===
Kew (3)
Party	Candidate	Votes	%	±%
Liberal Democrats	Serge Lourie*	1,618	47.14	▲0.48
Liberal Democrats	Jill Miller*	1,603		
Liberal Democrats	Anthony Barnett*	1,558		
Conservative	Robin Jowit	1,295	37.93	▲2.39
Conservative	Susan Britto	1,284		
Conservative	John Saywell	1,266		
Labour	Neil Cobbett	548	14.93	▲0.09
Labour	Pamela Marder	502		
Labour	Amanda Villanueva	464		
Registered electors		7,508		▲569
Turnout		3,521	46.90	▼12.40
Rejected ballots		3	0.09	▼0.06
Liberal Democrats hold				
Liberal Democrats hold				
Liberal Democrats hold				

=== Mortlake ===
Mortlake (3)
Party	Candidate	Votes	%	±%
Liberal Democrats	Eleanor Stanier* (Note: Stanier was elected in a by-election triggered by the resignation of Cllr Susan Fenwick in 1997)	1,048	38.63	▼13.77
Labour	Barry Langford	1,014	38.93	▲21.74
Labour	Brian Matthews	1,004		
Labour	Barnaby Marder	979		
Liberal Democrats	Julian Rudd	975		
Liberal Democrats	Stephen Vernon	951		
Conservative	Carolyn Hoy	593	22.44	▼7.97
Conservative	Malcom McAlister	575		
Conservative	John Earl	559		
Registered electors		6,020		▲196
Turnout		2,749	45.66	▼8.08
Rejected ballots		13	0.47	▲0.18
Liberal Democrats hold				
Labour gain from Liberal Democrats				
Labour gain from Liberal Democrats				

=== Palewell ===
Palewell (3)
Party	Candidate	Votes	%	±%
Liberal Democrats	Josephine Summers*	1,459	45.04	▼1.82
Liberal Democrats	Michael Daglish	1,387		
Conservative	Helen Blake	1,315	42.57	▲1.09
Liberal Democrats	Anthony Manners*	1,313		
Conservative	Nicola Urquhart	1,310		
Conservative	John Saunders	1,306		
Labour	William Genders	386	12.39	▲0.73
Labour	Kevin Creighan	383		
Labour	Maureen Metzger	375		
Registered electors		6,361		▲467
Turnout		3,213	50.51	▼10.04
Rejected ballots		12	0.37	▲0.23
Liberal Democrats hold				
Liberal Democrats hold				
Conservative gain from Liberal Democrats				

=== Richmond Hill ===
Richmond Hill (3)
Party	Candidate	Votes	%	±%
Liberal Democrats	Mary Weber*	1,287	48.10	▲3.81
Liberal Democrats	Penelope Lee	1,261		
Liberal Democrats	Anthony Mollett	1,220		
Conservative	George Gray	993	36.72	▼3.57
Conservative	Carolann Van Dinter	949		
Conservative	Marcus Marsh	934		
Labour	Martin Geoffrey	418	15.18	▼0.24
Labour	Alan Laird	413		
Labour	Matthew Syed	358		
Registered electors		6,576		▲591
Turnout		2,725	41.44	▼14.50
Rejected ballots		19	0.70	▲0.52
Liberal Democrats hold				
Liberal Democrats hold				
Liberal Democrats hold				

=== Richmond Town ===
Richmond Town (2)
Party	Candidate	Votes	%	±%
Liberal Democrats	Alison Cornish*	960	50.33	▼0.06
Liberal Democrats	Nicholas Carthew*	926		
Conservative	Rodney Bennett	609	31.79	▼2.72
Conservative	Ian Watts	582		
Labour	Patrick Dunne	353	17.88	▲2.78
Labour	Kevin Monks	317		
Registered electors		4,748		▲348
Turnout		1,959	41.26	▼17.67
Rejected ballots		4	0.20	▲0.05
Liberal Democrats hold				
Liberal Democrats hold				

=== South Twickenham ===
South Twickenham (3)
Party	Candidate	Votes	%	±%
Conservative	Douglas Orchard*	1,381	35.38	▼2.35
Conservative	Alan Butler	1,246		
Conservative	Nicholas Lait	1,243		
Liberal Democrats	Geoffrey Pope*	1,142	27.63	▼12.03
Labour	Fraser Cullen	992	25.94	▲3.33
Liberal Democrats	Mary Carr*	989		
Labour	Ann Mayer	958		
Liberal Democrats	Steven Topol	891		
Labour	Nicholas Butters	888		
Ind. Residents	John Armstrong	403	11.05	New
Registered electors		7,499		▲292
Turnout		3,527	47.03	▼4.99
Rejected ballots		9	0.26	▲0.13
Conservative gain from Liberal Democrats				
Conservative gain from Liberal Democrats				
Conservative hold				

=== Teddington ===
Teddington (3)
Party	Candidate	Votes	%	±%
Liberal Democrats	Martin Elengorn*	1,603	48.59	▼4.92
Liberal Democrats	Stephen Knight	1,502		
Liberal Democrats	James Mumford	1,495		
Conservative	Peter Temlett	1,044	31.97	▲3.37
Conservative	Kenneth Maxwell	995		
Conservative	Joe Broughton	987		
Labour	Christopher Boaler	623	19.44	▲1.55
Labour	Penelope Banaji	613		
Labour	Nuala Orton	604		
Registered electors		7,644		▲351
Turnout		3,303	43.21	▼11.31
Rejected ballots		22	0.67	▲0.49
Liberal Democrats hold				
Liberal Democrats hold				
Liberal Democrats hold				

=== West Twickenham ===
West Twickenham (2)
Party	Candidate	Votes	%	±%
Labour	Michael Gold*	1,028	48.76	▲7.50
Labour	Elizabeth Mackenzie*	982		
Liberal Democrats	Piers Allen	620	29.50	▼8.28
Liberal Democrats	Rebecca Knight	596		
Conservative	Penelope-Jane Hollis	379	18.34	▼2.62
Conservative	Richard Hollis	377		
Socialist Labour	Amanda Rose	70	3.40	New
Registered electors		4,797		▲123
Turnout		2,117	44.13	▼13.27
Rejected ballots		3	0.14	▼0.08
Labour hold				
Labour hold				

=== Whitton ===
Whitton (3)
Party	Candidate	Votes	%	±%
Liberal Democrats	Georgina Mackinney*	1,357	42.29	▼4.96
Liberal Democrats	Keith Mackinney*	1,343		
Liberal Democrats	Keith Warren*	1,308		
Conservative	Godfrey Jezzard	1,270	38.68	▲3.49
Conservative	Terence Pearce	1,201		
Conservative	Michael Pearce	1,195		
Labour	Sally Lupton	619	19.03	▲1.47
Labour	Daniel Harry	594		
Labour	Jacqueline Morgan	591		
Registered electors		7,107		▲208
Turnout		3,369	47.40	▼6.59
Rejected ballots		19	0.56	▲0.37
Liberal Democrats hold				
Liberal Democrats hold				
Liberal Democrats hold				
