= 1994 Richmond upon Thames London Borough Council election =

1994 local election in England

- 5 May 1994

All 52 seats up for election to Richmond upon Thames London Borough Council 27 seats needed for a majority
- Registered: 116,856
- Turnout: 64,945, 55.58% (▼4.08)

	First party	Second party	Third party
Leader	David Williams	Unknown	Unknown
Party	Liberal Democrats	Conservative	Labour
Leader since	1983	Unknown
Leader's seat	Ham and Petersham	Unknown
Last election	48 seats, 48.17%	4 seats, 35.25%	0 seats, 14.70%
Seats before	49	3	0
Seats won	43	7	2
Seat change	▼6	▲4	▲2
Popular vote	80,699	60,790	30,892
Percentage	46.78%	35.24%	17.91%
Swing	▼1.39	▼0.01	▲3.21
Council control before election
Liberal Democrats
Council control after election
Liberal Democrats

The 1994 Richmond upon Thames Council election took place on 5 May 1994 to elect members of Richmond upon Thames London Borough Council in London, England. The whole council was up for election and the Liberal Democrats stayed in overall control of the council.

== Election result ==
1994 Richmond upon Thames local election
Party	Seats	Gains	Losses	Net gain/loss	Seats %	Votes %	Votes	+/−
Liberal Democrats	43	1	7	▼6	82.69	46.78	80,699	▼1.39
Conservative	7	5	1	▲4	13.46	35.24	60,790	▼0.01
Labour	2	2	0	▲2	3.85	17.91	30,892	▲3.21
Ind. Conservative	0	0	0	Steady	0.00	0.07	117	New
Total	52						172,498	

== Ward results ==
(*) - Indicates an incumbent candidate

(†) - Indicates an incumbent candidate standing in a different ward

=== Barnes ===
Barnes (3)
Party	Candidate	Votes	%	±%
Liberal Democrats	Catharine Gent*	1,891	48.89	▲3.06
Liberal Democrats	Barbara Westmorland*	1,757		
Liberal Democrats	Patricia Style*	1,686		
Conservative	June Robinson	1,551	40.72	▲1.49
Conservative	Heather Britton	1,461		
Conservative	John Yandle	1,432		
Labour	Melvyn Gooding	397	10.39	▲3.13
Labour	Colin Patterson	375		
Labour	Peter Hallam	361		
Registered electors		6,305		▲54
Turnout		3,826	60.68	▼7.36
Rejected ballots		5	0.13	▲0.06
Liberal Democrats hold				
Liberal Democrats hold				
Liberal Democrats hold				

=== Central Twickenham ===
Central Twickenham (2)
Party	Candidate	Votes	%	±%
Conservative	Susan Lever	1,063	38.96	▲4.37
Conservative	Philip Northey	1,022		
Liberal Democrats	John Coombs* (Note: Coombs replaced Cllr Anthony Johnson after his resignation in 1992)	1,005	36.61	▲1.30
Liberal Democrats	David Ward	955		
Labour	Stephen Miller	667	24.43	▲3.78
Labour	Christopher Moss	641		
Registered electors		4,990		▼39
Turnout		2,780	55.71	▼4.28
Rejected ballots		3	0.11	▲0.01
Conservative gain from Liberal Democrats				
Conservative gain from Liberal Democrats				

=== East Sheen ===
East Sheen (2)
Party	Candidate	Votes	%	±%
Conservative	Sidney Grose*	1,306	51.21	▲0.57
Conservative	Timothy Rycroft	1,282		
Liberal Democrats	Philip Morris	976	38.58	▼0.93
Liberal Democrats	Brenda Curd	973		
Labour	Penelope Curtis	281	10.21	▲2.78
Labour	John Fowler	235		
Registered electors		4,334		▲13
Turnout		2,633	60.75	▼3.89
Rejected ballots		8	0.30	▲0.12
Conservative hold				
Conservative hold				

=== East Twickenham ===
East Twickenham (3)
Party	Candidate	Votes	%	±%
Liberal Democrats	John Rowlands*	1,982	45.82	▼2.25
Liberal Democrats	David Cornwell*	1,875		
Liberal Democrats	Laurence Mann	1,824		
Conservative	Timothy Greenhough	1,182	27.62	▼2.33
Conservative	Maxwell Henderson-Begg	1,144		
Labour	Feola Choat	1,115	26.56	▲4.58
Labour	Peter Saxton	1,102		
Conservative	Andrew James	1,100		
Labour	Doreen Vernon	1,077		
Registered electors		8,114		▲1,725
Turnout		4,349	53.60	▼3.98
Rejected ballots		6	0.14	▼0.13
Liberal Democrats hold				
Liberal Democrats hold				
Liberal Democrats hold				

=== Ham and Petersham ===
Ham and Petersham (3)
Party	Candidate	Votes	%	±%
Liberal Democrats	Susan Jones*	1,924	59.71	▼1.16
Liberal Democrats	David Williams*	1,915		
Liberal Democrats	Raymond Hart*	1,896		
Conservative	Ronald Proctor	852	26.27	▼0.32
Conservative	Stephen Matthews	838		
Conservative	Oliver Strebel	832		
Labour	Alan Bazely	483	14.02	▲1.48
Labour	Pamela Risner	450		
Labour	Percy Gourgey	414		
Registered electors		5,794		▲85
Turnout		3,378	58.30	▼7.07
Rejected ballots		4	0.12	▲0.07
Liberal Democrats hold				
Liberal Democrats hold				
Liberal Democrats hold				

=== Hampton ===
Hampton (3)
Party	Candidate	Votes	%	±%
Liberal Democrats	Bryan Woodriff*	1,569	48.41	▼0.78
Liberal Democrats	Robert Parslow* (Note: Parslow replaced Cllr Gavin Alexander after his death in 1993)	1,557		
Liberal Democrats	Marshall Lees	1,494		
Conservative	Stuart Leamy	1,134	34.96	▼1.70
Conservative	Graham Norris	1,117		
Conservative	Elizabeth Parsons	1,085		
Labour	Christine Cross	574	16.63	▲2.48
Labour	Geoffrey Wheeler	519		
Labour	Marcus Maclaine	493		
Registered electors		6,433		▼89
Turnout		3,406	52.95	▼7.58
Rejected ballots		8	0.23	▲0.13
Liberal Democrats hold				
Liberal Democrats hold				
Liberal Democrats hold				

=== Hampton Hill ===
Hampton Hill (3)
Party	Candidate	Votes	%	±%
Liberal Democrats	Barbara Alexander	1,567	42.18	▲6.17
Conservative	Holly Champion	1,517	40.07	▲7.14
Liberal Democrats	David Martin	1,469		
Liberal Democrats	Lynne Ferguson	1463		
Conservative	Grant Clifford	1392		
Conservative	Anne Woodward	1366		
Labour	Sally Pearson	667	17.75	▲2.89
Labour	Fletcher Sowerby	618		
Labour	Geoffrey Freitag	607		
Registered electors		6,561		▼189
Turnout		3,689	56.23	▼2.16
Rejected ballots		8	0.22	▲0.19
Liberal Democrats hold				
Conservative gain from Liberal Democrats				
Liberal Democrats gain from Conservative				

=== Hampton Nursery ===
Hampton Nursery (2)
Party	Candidate	Votes	%	±%
Liberal Democrats	Maureen Woodriff*	1,090	47.91	▼6.12
Liberal Democrats	Marion Quelch	1,018		
Conservative	Margaret Williams	695	30.82	▲0.79
Conservative	June Cape	661		
Labour	Martin Cross	491	21.27	▲5.33
Labour	David Stephenson	444		
Registered electors		4,809		▲35
Turnout		2,310	48.03	▼4.38
Rejected ballots		5	0.22	▲0.10
Liberal Democrats hold				
Liberal Democrats hold				

=== Hampton Wick ===
Hampton Wick (3)
Party	Candidate	Votes	%	±%
Liberal Democrats	Gita Rae	1,532	42.22	▼4.37
Liberal Democrats	Malcom McDougall*	1,499		
Conservative	Tony Arbour	1,481	40.47	▲1.19
Liberal Democrats	Nicolas Nicol	1,432		
Conservative	Jean Matthews	1,403		
Conservative	Joanne Manson	1,395		
Labour	Eva Tutchell	633	17.31	▲3.18
Labour	Derek Tutchell	612		
Labour	Gerard Ward	586		
Registered electors		7,240		▲286
Turnout		3,737	51.61	▼5.74
Rejected ballots		6	0.16	▲0.01
Liberal Democrats hold				
Liberal Democrats hold				
Conservative gain from Liberal Democrats				

=== Heathfield ===
Heathfield (3)
Party	Candidate	Votes	%	±%
Liberal Democrats	Robert King*	1,859	49.08	▼0.89
Liberal Democrats	Lizette Narain*	1,810		
Liberal Democrats	Michael Jones*	1,803		
Conservative	Thelma Haywood	1,259	33.37	▼2.27
Conservative	Philip Perry	1,252		
Conservative	Patricia Pipe	1,208		
Labour	Yvonne McNamara	694	17.55	▲3.16
Labour	Patricia Hunt	662		
Labour	Keith Walters	601		
Registered electors		7,161		▼148
Turnout		3,949	55.15	▼1.41
Rejected ballots		8	0.20	▲0.05
Liberal Democrats hold				
Liberal Democrats hold				
Liberal Democrats hold				

=== Kew ===
Kew (3)
Party	Candidate	Votes	%	±%
Liberal Democrats	Serge Lourie*	1,891	46.66	▲1.02
Liberal Democrats	Jill Miller*	1,848		
Liberal Democrats	Anthony Barnett	1,786		
Conservative	Diana Guy	1,448	35.54	▲4.00
Conservative	Simon Owens	1,384		
Conservative	William Conchie	1,377		
Labour	Barnaby Leons-Marder	611	14.84	▲3.84
Labour	Pamela Leons-Marder	605		
Labour	Celia Stevens	541		
Ind. Conservative	Margaret Harrison	117	2.96	New
Registered electors		6,939		▲180
Turnout		4,115	59.30	▼3.71
Rejected ballots		6	0.15	▲0.13
Liberal Democrats hold				
Liberal Democrats hold				
Liberal Democrats hold				

=== Mortlake ===
Mortlake (3)
Party	Candidate	Votes	%	±%
Liberal Democrats	Tim Razzall*	1,578	52.40	▼4.54
Liberal Democrats	Susan Fenwick*	1,526		
Liberal Democrats	Paul Farthing^{†} (Note: Farthing was a sitting councillor representing the Richmond Hill ward)	1,508		
Conservative	Jane West	900	30.41	▲3.24
Conservative	John Saunders	898		
Conservative	Ross Hendry	878		
Labour	Brian Matthews	523	17.19	▲1.30
Labour	Edward Masters	511		
Labour	Ann Neimer	478		
Registered electors		5,824		▼69
Turnout		3,130	53.74	▼4.58
Rejected ballots		9	0.29	▲0.09
Liberal Democrats hold				
Liberal Democrats hold				
Liberal Democrats hold				

=== Palewell ===
Palewell (3)
Party	Candidate	Votes	%	±%
Liberal Democrats	Sally Hamwee*	1,674	46.86	▼2.95
Liberal Democrats	Josephine Summers*	1,615		
Liberal Democrats	Anthony Manners*	1,547		
Conservative	Martin Graham	1,491	41.48	▲0.18
Conservative	Neville Otty	1,415		
Conservative	Olivia Jabourian	1,376		
Labour	William Genders	428	11.66	▲2.77
Labour	Christopher Green	420		
Labour	Ronald Lumborg	354		
Registered electors		5,894		▼77
Turnout		3,569	60.55	▼3.01
Rejected ballots		5	0.14	▼0.10
Liberal Democrats hold				
Liberal Democrats hold				
Liberal Democrats hold				

=== Richmond Hill ===
Richmond Hill (3)
Party	Candidate	Votes	%	±%
Liberal Democrats	Mary Weber	1,429	44.29	▼3.16
Liberal Democrats	Brian Miller*	1,398		
Liberal Democrats	Martin Pierce*	1,395		
Conservative	Simon Edwards	1,296	40.29	▲9.65
Conservative	Alexander Redman	1,278		
Conservative	David Sparrow	1,267		
Labour	Alan Laird	541	15.42	▲3.51
Labour	Arnold Barfield	465		
Labour	Joy Mostyn	464		
Registered electors		5,985		▲43
Turnout		3,348	55.94	▼0.86
Rejected ballots		6	0.18	▲0.09
Liberal Democrats hold				
Liberal Democrats hold				
Liberal Democrats hold				

=== Richmond Town ===
Richmond Town (2)
Party	Candidate	Votes	%	±%
Liberal Democrats	Alison Cornish*	1,267	50.39	▲2.94
Liberal Democrats	Nicholas Carthew*	1,194		
Conservative	Philip Taylor	845	34.51	▲1.87
Conservative	Rodney Bennett	841		
Labour	Garry Graham	370	15.10	▲3.19
Labour	Susan Jenkins	368		
Registered electors		4,400		▲45
Turnout		2,593	58.93	▼3.66
Rejected ballots		4	0.15	Steady
Liberal Democrats hold				
Liberal Democrats hold				

=== South Twickenham ===
South Twickenham (3)
Party	Candidate	Votes	%	±%
Liberal Democrats	Geoff Pope*	1,552	39.66	▲1.34
Liberal Democrats	Mary Carr	1,374		
Conservative	Douglas Orchard	1,369	37.73	▲3.02
Conservative	Nora Millar	1,357		
Liberal Democrats	Steven Topol	1,336		
Conservative	Mark Lloyd	1,330		
Labour	Terence Smith	838	22.61	▲6.11
Labour	Kenneth Nelson	808		
Labour	Stephen Guichard	783		
Registered electors		7,207		▲186
Turnout		3,749	52.02	▼3.80
Rejected ballots		5	0.13	▲0.13
Liberal Democrats hold				
Liberal Democrats hold				
Conservative gain from Liberal Democrats				

=== Teddington ===
Teddington (3)
Party	Candidate	Votes	%	±%
Liberal Democrats	Martin Elengorn*	2,070	53.51	▲10.37
Liberal Democrats	Elaine Pippard*	2,035		
Liberal Democrats	Roger Morgan	1,953		
Conservative	Peter Temlett	1,108	28.60	▼0.47
Conservative	Simon Lamb	1,082		
Conservative	Iain Naughton	1,047		
Labour	Kevin Gilligan	700	17.89	▲2.74
Labour	Christopher Boaler	673		
Labour	Theresa Rowe	653		
Registered electors		7,293		▲112
Turnout		3,976	54.52	▼4.59
Rejected ballots		7	0.18	▲0.04
Liberal Democrats hold				
Liberal Democrats hold				
Liberal Democrats hold				

=== West Twickenham ===
West Twickenham (2)
Party	Candidate	Votes	%	±%
Labour	Michael Gold	1,087	41.26	▲12.16
Labour	Elizabeth Mackenzie	1,023		
Liberal Democrats	Piers Allen	978	37.78	▼11.45
Liberal Democrats	Hugh Brenchley*	953		
Conservative	Penelope-Jane Hollis	540	20.96	▼0.71
Conservative	Richard Hollis	531		
Registered electors		4,674		▲160
Turnout		2,683	57.40	▼2.15
Rejected ballots		6	0.22	Steady
Labour gain from Liberal Democrats				
Labour gain from Liberal Democrats				

=== Whitton ===
Whitton (3)
Party	Candidate	Votes	%	±%
Liberal Democrats	Keith Mackinney*	1,692	47.25	▲3.12
Liberal Democrats	Georgina Mackinney*	1,667		
Liberal Democrats	Keith Warren*	1,612		
Conservative	Michael Pearce	1,250	35.19	▲2.57
Conservative	Norma Rowles	1,232		
Conservative	Kevin Ross	1,220		
Labour	Paul Thompson	642	17.56	▲2.94
Labour	John Ennals	625		
Labour	Andrew Warmington	582		
Registered electors		6,899		▲20
Turnout		3,725	53.99	▼2.68
Rejected ballots		7	0.19	▲0.19
Liberal Democrats hold				
Liberal Democrats hold				
Liberal Democrats hold				
