= 1990 Richmond upon Thames London Borough Council election =

Local election in England

- 3 May 1990

All 52 seats up for election to Richmond upon Thames London Borough Council 27 seats needed for a majority
- Registered: 114,523
- Turnout: 68,329, 59.66%

	First party	Second party	Third party
Leader	David Williams	Unknown	Unknown
Party	Liberal Democrats	Conservative	Labour
Leader since	1983	Unknown	Unknown
Leader's seat	Ham and Petersham	Unknown	Unknown
Seats before	49	3	0
Seats won	48	4	0
Seat change	▼1	▲1	Steady
Popular vote	87,327	63,906	26,644
Percentage	48.17%	35.25%	14.70%
Council control before election
Liberal Democrats
Council control after election
Liberal Democrats

The 1990 Richmond upon Thames Borough Council election took place on 3 May 1990 to elect members of Richmond upon Thames London Borough Council in London, England. The whole council was up for election and the Liberal Democrats (successors of the SDP–Liberal Alliance) stayed in overall control of the council.

== Election result ==
↓
48	4
Liberal Democrats	Conservative

1990 Richmond Upon Thames local elections
Party	Seats	Gains	Losses	Net gain/loss	Seats %	Votes %	Votes	+/−
Liberal Democrats	48	1	2	▼1	92.31	48.17	87,327	
Conservative	4	2	1	▲1	7.61	35.25	63,906	
Labour	0	0	0	Steady	0.00	14.70	26,644	
Green	0	0	0	Steady	0.00	1.78	3,218	
SDP	0	0	0	Steady	0.00	0.10	189	
Total	52						181,284	

== Ward results ==
(*) - indicates an incumbent candidate

=== Barnes ===
Barnes (3)
Party	Candidate	Votes	%
Liberal Democrats	Catherine Gent*	2,108	45.83
Liberal Democrats	Barbara Westmorland	1,905	
Liberal Democrats	Patricia Style	1,857	
Conservative	June Robinson*	1,821	39.23
Conservative	Heather Britton	1,614	
Conservative	Geoffrey Bowen	1,591	
Green	John Neary	328	7.68
Labour	Norma Crabtree	326	7.26
Labour	Melvyn Gooding	309	
Labour	Ann Neimer	296	
Registered electors		6,251	
Turnout		4253	68.04
Rejected ballots		3	0.07
Liberal Democrats hold			
Liberal Democrats hold			
Liberal Democrats gain from Conservative			

=== Central Twickenham ===
Central Twickenham (2)
Party	Candidate	Votes	%
Liberal Democrats	Anne Beltran*	1,106	35.31
Conservative	Anthony Johnson	1,050	34.59
Conservative	Mary Rae	1,043	
Liberal Democrats	John Coombs	1,032	
Labour	Vernon Alexander	644	20.65
Labour	Michael Gold	605	
Green	Caroline Van Howe	286	9.45
Registered electors		5,029	
Turnout		3017	59.99
Rejected ballots		3	0.10
Liberal Democrats hold			
Conservative gain from Liberal Democrats			

=== East Sheen ===
East Sheen (2)
Party	Candidate	Votes	%
Conservative	Kitty Baden-Powell	1,404	50.64
Conservative	Sidney Grose*	1,362	
Liberal Democrats	Anthony Griffin	1,106	39.51
Liberal Democrats	Phillip Morris	1,052	
Labour	Phillip Lamb	214	7.43
Labour	Ernest Pugsley	192	
SDP	David McConnon	66	2.42
Registered electors		4,321	
Turnout		2793	64.64
Rejected ballots		5	0.18
Conservative hold			
Conservative hold			

=== East Twickenham ===
East Twickenham (3)
Party	Candidate	Votes	%
Liberal Democrats	John Rowlands*	1,681	48.07
Liberal Democrats	David Cornwell*	1,667	
Liberal Democrats	Sydney Nunn*	1,631	
Conservative	Robbie Gibb	1,051	29.95
Conservative	Timothy Greenhough	1,048	
Conservative	Steven Stanbury	1,002	
Labour	Christopher Boaler	783	21.98
Labour	John Fowler	751	
Labour	Doreen Vernon	744	
Registered electors		6,389	
Turnout		3679	57.58
Rejected ballots		10	0.27
Liberal Democrats hold			
Liberal Democrats hold			
Liberal Democrats hold			

=== Ham and Petersham ===
Ham and Petersham (3)
Party	Candidate	Votes	%
Liberal Democrats	David Williams*	2,204	60.87
Liberal Democrats	Susan Jones*	2,161	
Liberal Democrats	Raymond Hart*	2,159	
Conservative	Christopher Varley	952	26.59
Conservative	Herbery Pearce-Batten	949	
Conservative	Olivia Jabourian	948	
Labour	Anthony Hart	499	12.54
Labour	Jenifer Wyatt	428	
Labour	Andrew Gilligan	416	
Registered electors		5,709	
Turnout		3732	65.37
Rejected ballots		2	0.05
Liberal Democrats hold			
Liberal Democrats hold			
Liberal Democrats hold			

=== Hampton ===
Hampton (3)
Party	Candidate	Votes	%
Liberal Democrats	Bryan Woodriff*	1,861	49.19
Liberal Democrats	Gavin Alexander	1,827	
Liberal Democrats	Dee Doocey*	1,778	
Conservative	George Kenton	1,438	36.66
Conservative	Karen Gabony	1,337	
Conservative	Ivars Svilis	1,298	
Labour	Martin Cross	557	14.15
Labour	John Ennals	509	
Labour	Carmela Carrier	505	
Registered electors		6,522	
Turnout		3948	60.53
Rejected ballots		4	0.10
Liberal Democrats hold			
Liberal Democrats hold			
Liberal Democrats hold			

=== Hampton Hill ===
Hampton Hill (3)
Party	Candidate	Votes	%
Liberal Democrats	John Webb*	1,576	36.01
Liberal Democrats	Barbara Alexander	1,516	
Conservative	Holly Champion	1,452	32.93
Liberal Democrats	Geoffrey Stone	1,422	
Conservative	Anne Woodward	1,345	
Conservative	Richard Hollis	1,332	
Labour	Stephen Cox	646	14.86
Labour	Elizabeth Mackenzie	622	
Labour	Sally Pearson	595	
Green	Jeremy Hywell-Davies	554	13.26
SDP	June Razzelle	123	2.94
Registered electors		6,750	
Turnout		3941	58.39
Rejected ballots		1	0.03
Liberal Democrats hold			
Liberal Democrats hold			
Conservative gain from Liberal Democrats			

=== Hampton Nursery ===
Hampton Nursery (2)
Party	Candidate	Votes	%
Liberal Democrats	Maureen Woodriff*	1,290	54.03
Liberal Democrats	Raymond Ball*	1,258	
Conservative	Marilyn Thomas	722	30.03
Conservative	Margaret Williams	694	
Labour	Richard Barry	390	15.94
Labour	Steven Coleman	362	
Registered electors		4,774	
Turnout		2502	52.41
Rejected ballots		3	0.12
Liberal Democrats hold			
Liberal Democrats hold			

=== Hampton Wick ===
Hampton Wick (3)
Party	Candidate	Votes	%
Liberal Democrats	Malcolm Garside*	1,798	46.59
Liberal Democrats	Rosemary Nieper	1,771	
Liberal Democrats	Malcolm McDougall*	1,683	
Conservative	Anthony Arbour	1,541	39.28
Conservative	Roger Avins	1,462	
Conservative	Elizabeth Parsons	1,424	
Labour	Derek Tutchell	559	14.13
Labour	Eva Tutchell	521	
Labour	Gerard Ward	513	
Registered electors		6,954	
Turnout		3988	57.35
Rejected ballots		6	0.15
Liberal Democrats hold			
Liberal Democrats hold			
Liberal Democrats hold			

=== Heathfield ===
Heathfield (3)
Party	Candidate	Votes	%
Liberal Democrats	Robert King*	2,009	49.97
Liberal Democrats	Michael Jones*	1,913	
Liberal Democrats	Lizette Narrain	1,891	
Conservative	Thelma Haywood	1,403	35.64
Conservative	Howard Kirby	1,373	
Conservative	Philip Perry	1,370	
Labour	Paul Thompson	572	14.39
Labour	Geoffrey Freitag	567	
Labour	Keith Walters	535	
Registered electors		7,309	
Turnout		4134	56.56
Rejected ballots		6	0.15
Liberal Democrats hold			
Liberal Democrats hold			
Liberal Democrats gain from Conservative			

=== Kew ===
Kew (3)
Party	Candidate	Votes	%
Liberal Democrats	Nigel Halliday*	2,098	45.64
Liberal Democrats	Jill Miller	1,959	
Liberal Democrats	Serge Lourie*	1,956	
Conservative	Simon Owens	1,465	31.54
Conservative	Andrew James	1,354	
Conservative	Catherine Smart	1,337	
Labour	Emil Campion	529	11.00
Green	Sylvia Levi	519	11.82
Labour	Paul Rowlands	464	
Labour	Anthony Kreppel	456	
Registered electors		6,759	
Turnout		4259	63.01
Rejected ballots		1	0.02
Liberal Democrats hold			
Liberal Democrats hold			
Liberal Democrats hold			

=== Mortlake ===
Mortlake (3)
Party	Candidate	Votes	%
Liberal Democrats	Deidre Razzall*	1,938	56.94
Liberal Democrats	Tit Razzall*	1,846	
Liberal Democrats	Susan Fenwick	1,753	
Conservative	John Saunders	886	27.17
Conservative	Kay Dixon	884	
Conservative	Monica Port-Saunders	874	
Labour	Paul Ormerod	524	15.89
Labour	Paul Smyth	524	
Labour	Carole Upshall	497	
Registered electors		5,893	
Turnout		3437	58.32
Rejected ballots		7	0.20
Liberal Democrats hold			
Liberal Democrats hold			
Liberal Democrats hold			

=== Palewell ===
Palewell (3)
Party	Candidate	Votes	%
Liberal Democrats	Sally Hamwee*	1,852	49.81
Liberal Democrats	Josephine Summers*	1,802	
Liberal Democrats	Anthony Manners*	1,756	
Conservative	Stephanie Snow	1,521	41.30
Conservative	David Sparrow	1,494	
Conservative	Christopher Lewis	1,470	
Labour	Christopher Green	333	8.89
Labour	Audrey Hunt	319	
Labour	Michele Low	313	
Registered electors		5,971	
Turnout		3795	63.56
Rejected ballots		9	0.24
Liberal Democrats hold			
Liberal Democrats hold			
Liberal Democrats hold			

=== Richmond Hill ===
Richmond Hill (3)
Party	Candidate	Votes	%
Liberal Democrats	Paul Farthing	1,566	47.18
Liberal Democrats	Brian Miller	1,513	
Liberal Democrats	Martin Pierce	1,494	
Conservative	John Graham	1,351	40.31
Conservative	Peter Kelley	1,312	
Conservative	Robert Whelan	1,242	
Labour	Sarah Simon	425	12.51
Labour	Philip Bevan	416	
Labour	Pamela Risner	371	
Registered electors		5,942	
Turnout		3375	56.80
Rejected ballots		3	0.09
Liberal Democrats hold			
Liberal Democrats hold			
Liberal Democrats hold			

=== Richmond Town ===
Richmond Town (2)
Party	Candidate	Votes	%
Liberal Democrats	Alison Cornish*	1,388	47.45
Liberal Democrats	Nicholas Carthew	1,233	
Conservative	Gordon Pocock	906	32.64
Conservative	Anthony Kinsella	898	
Labour	Adam Hinton	349	11.91
Labour	Sydney Sutlers	309	
Green	Roger Sandell	221	8.00
Registered electors		4,355	
Turnout		2726	62.59
Rejected ballots		4	0.15
Liberal Democrats hold			
Liberal Democrats hold			

=== South Twickenham ===
South Twickenham (3)
Party	Candidate	Votes	%
Liberal Democrats	Geoff Pope*	1,602	38.32
Liberal Democrats	Lynne Ferguson	1,498	
Liberal Democrats	Robert Beattie*	1,489	
Conservative	Charles Cockburn	1,426	34.71
Conservative	Maurice Press	1,380	
Conservative	Carlton Rae	1,353	
Labour	Duncan Macpherson.	703	16.50
Labour	Angela Thompson	641	
Labour	Terence Smith	634	
Green	David Batchelor	418	10.47
Registered electors		7,021	
Turnout		3919	55.82
Rejected ballots		0	0.00
Liberal Democrats hold			
Liberal Democrats hold			
Liberal Democrats hold			

=== Teddington ===
Teddington (3)
Party	Candidate	Votes	%
Liberal Democrats	Martin Elengorn*	1,979	43.14
Liberal Democrats	Elaine Pippard*	1,913	
Liberal Democrats	Eugene O'Connor*	1,829	
Conservative	Peter Temlett	1,337	29.07
Conservative	Jean Mathews	1,268	
Conservative	Iain Naughton	1,251	
Labour	Catherine Green	702	15.15
Labour	Kevin Gilligan	690	
Labour	David Neller	619	
Green	Phillipa Morgan	559	12.64
Registered electors		7,181	
Turnout		4245	59.11
Rejected ballots		6	0.14
Liberal Democrats hold			
Liberal Democrats hold			
Liberal Democrats hold			

=== West Twickenham ===
West Twickenham (2)
Party	Candidate	Votes	%
Liberal Democrats	Hugh Brenchley	1,277	49.23
Liberal Democrats	Jeremy Davis	1,217	
Labour	Steven Cobb	778	29.10
Labour	Timothy Macpherson	696	
Conservative	Jacqueline Foster	567	21.67
Conservative	Penelope-Jane Hollis	531	
Registered electors		4,514	
Turnout		2688	59.55
Rejected ballots		6	0.22
Liberal Democrats hold			
Liberal Democrats hold			

=== Whitton ===
Whitton (3)
Party	Candidate	Votes	%
Liberal Democrats	Keith Mackinney*	1,746	44.13
Liberal Democrats	Georgina Mackinney	1,681	
Liberal Democrats	Keith Warren	1,680	
Conservative	David Mason-Johns	1,266	32.62
Conservative	Nora Millar	1,260	
Conservative	Walter Kelly	1,247	
Labour	Julia Greenwood	587	14.62
Labour	Margaret Clarke	571	
Labour	Graham Johnson	534	
Green	Jack Ellis	333	8.63
Registered electors		6,879	
Turnout		3898	56.67
Rejected ballots		0	0.00
Liberal Democrats hold			
Liberal Democrats hold			
Liberal Democrats hold			
