= Hampton Wick and South Teddington =

Electoral ward in London, England

- Electoral ward for the Richmond upon Thames London Borough Council
- Borough: Richmond upon Thames
- County: Greater London
- Population: 10,504 (2021)
- Major settlements: Barnes, London
- Area: 2.742 km²

Current electoral ward
- Created: 2022
- Seats: 3

Hampton Wick and South Teddington is an electoral ward in the London Borough of Richmond upon Thames. The ward was first used in the 2022 elections and elects three councillors to Richmond upon Thames London Borough Council.

== Geography ==
The ward is named after the districts of Hampton Wick and South Teddington.

== Councillors ==
| Election | Councillors | | |
|---|---|---|---|
| 2022 | Robin Brown (Liberal Democrats) | Petra Fleming (Liberal Democrats) | Jim Millard (Liberal Democrats) |

== Elections ==
=== 2022 ===
Hampton Wick & South Teddington
| Party | Candidate | Votes | % | ±% |
|---|---|---|---|---|
| Liberal Democrats | Robin Brown* | 2,795 | 71.1 | |
| Liberal Democrats | Petra Fleming* | 2,593 | 66.0 | |
| Liberal Democrats | Jim Millard* | 2,450 | 62.4 | |
| Conservative | Hilary Dance | 893 | 22.7 | |
| Conservative | Grant Healy | 876 | 22.3 | |
| Conservative | Jon Hollis | 831 | 21.2 | |
| Labour | Katharine Haynes | 393 | 10.0 | |
| Labour | Christopher Johnson | 382 | 9.7 | |
| Labour | Gerard Ward | 352 | 9.0 | |
| Turnout | | 2,929 | 49.0 | |
| Liberal Democrats hold | | Swing | | |
| Liberal Democrats hold | | Swing | | |
| Liberal Democrats gain from Green | | Swing | | |

== See also ==
- List of electoral wards in Greater London
