= 2022 Richmond upon Thames London Borough Council election =

2022 UK local government election

2022 Richmond upon Thames Council election
- 5 May 2022

All 54 seats on Richmond Council 28 seats needed for a majority
- Registered: 139,246
- Turnout: 66,555; 47.8% (▼3.6%)
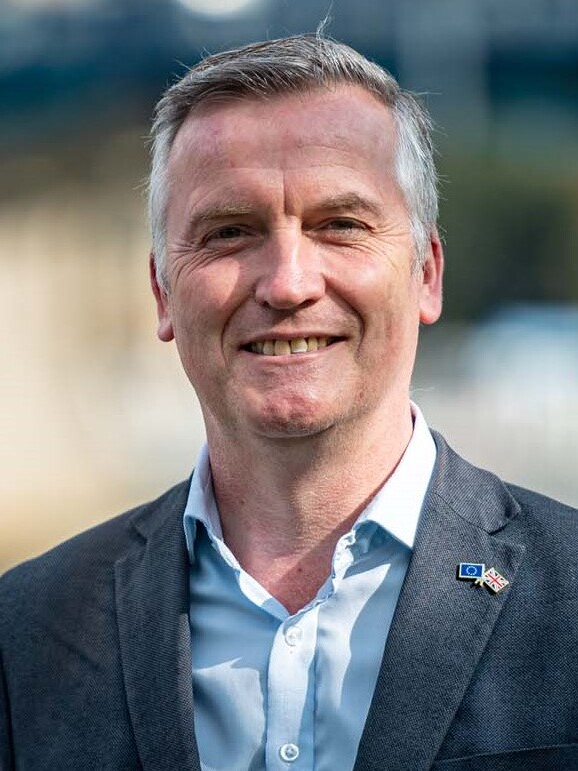
	First party	Second party	Third party
Leader	Gareth Roberts	Richard Bennett	Paul Hodgins
Party	Liberal Democrats	Green	Conservative
Last election	39 seats, 46.7%	4 seats, 4.5%	11 seats, 37.6%
Seats won	48	5	1
Seat change	▲9	▲1	▼10
Popular vote	107,493	10,218	50,571
Percentage	56.5%	5.4%	26.6%
Swing	▲9.8%	▲0.9%	▼11.0%
- Map of the results of the 2022 Richmond upon Thames Borough council election. Liberal Democrats in yellow, Conservatives in blue, Green Party in green.
council control before election
Liberal Democrats
Subsequent council control
Liberal Democrats

The 2022 Richmond upon Thames London Borough Council election took place on 5 May 2022. All 54 members of Richmond upon Thames London Borough Council were elected. The elections took place alongside local elections in the other London boroughs and elections to local authorities across the United Kingdom.

The 2022 election took place under new election boundaries, with the number of councillors remaining the same. The Liberal Democrats had controlled the council since the previous election in 2018, and increased their majority, ending on 48 seats, with all Liberal Democrat candidates being elected. (Note: Opposition councillors were elected only in wards where there were not as many Liberal Democrat candidates as seats available for that ward.) The Green Party formed the largest opposition group on five seats, with the Conservative Party dropping from 11 seats to 1 seat; they would subsequently lose their final seat in a 2024 by-election.

== Background ==
=== History ===
The thirty-two London boroughs were established in 1965 by the London Government Act 1963. They are the principal authorities in Greater London and have responsibilities including education, housing, planning, highways, social services, libraries, recreation, waste, environmental health and revenue collection. Some of the powers are shared with the Greater London Authority, which also manages passenger transport, police and fire.

Since its formation, Richmond upon Thames has been under Conservative control, Liberal Democrat control, SDP–Liberal Alliance control and no overall control. The Liberal Democrats regained control from the Conservatives in the most recent election in 2018. They won 39 seats with 46.7% of the vote across the borough while the Conservatives won 11 seats with 37.6% of the vote and the Greens won 4.5% of the vote. The Labour Party won 10.4% of the vote but did not win any seats. The leader of the Liberal Democrat group, Gareth Roberts, became council leader following the election.

=== Council term ===
In 2019, Mona Adams, the Liberal Democrat councillor for East Sheen, died. A by-election was held to fill her seat on 19 July 2019, which was won by the Liberal Democrat candidate Julia Cambridge. Cambridge was a designer who had unsuccessfully contested the seat alongside Adams in the 2018 election. In July 2020, Dylan Bexendale, the Green Party councillor for Hampton Wick, resigned citing personal reasons. Due to the COVID-19 pandemic, a by-election to fill his seat could not be held until 6 May 2021 alongside the 2021 London mayoral election and London Assembly election. The election was won by the Liberal Democrat candidate Petra Fleming.

As with most London boroughs, Richmond upon Thames was electing its councillors under new boundaries decided by the Local Government Boundary Commission for England, which it produced after a period of consultation. The number of councillors remained at 54, but the commission produced new boundaries following a period of consultation, with eighteen three-member wards.

== Electoral process ==
Richmond upon Thames, like other London borough councils, elects all of its councillors at once every four years. The previous election took place in 2018. The election took place by block voting, with each ward being represented by two or three councillors. Electors had as many votes as there are councillors to be elected in their ward, with the top two or three being elected.

All registered electors (British, Irish, Commonwealth and European Union citizens) living in London aged 18 or over were entitled to vote in the election. People who live at two addresses in different councils, such as university students with different term-time and holiday addresses, were entitled to be registered for and vote in elections in both local authorities. Voting in-person at polling stations took place from 7:00 to 22:00 on election day, and voters were able to apply for postal votes or proxy votes in advance of the election.

== Previous council composition ==
Council composition after the 2022 election

After 2018 election		Before 2022 election	
Party	Seats	Party	Seats
Liberal Democrats	39	Liberal Democrats	40
Conservative	11	Conservative	11
Green	4	Green	3

== Summary of results ==
2022 Richmond upon Thames London Borough Council election
Party	Seats	Gains	Losses	Net gain/loss	Seats %	Votes %	Votes	+/−
Liberal Democrats	48	9	0	▲9	88.9	56.5	107,493	+9.8
Green	5	2	1	▲1	9.3	5.4	10,218	+0.9
Conservative	1	0	10	▼10	1.9	26.6	50,571	-11.0
Labour	0	0	0	Steady	0.0	11.1	21,070	+0.7
Independent	0	0	0	Steady	0.0	0.7	1,419	+0.4
Women's Equality	0	0	0	Steady	0.0	0.7	1,361	+0.3

== Ward results ==
Candidates seeking re-election are marked with an asterisk (*). Councillors seeking re-election for a different ward are marked with a cross (†).

=== Barnes ===
Barnes
Party	Candidate	Votes	%	±%
Liberal Democrats	Fiona Sacks	1,960	51.7	
Liberal Democrats	Andy Hale	1,890	49.8	
Liberal Democrats	Marjory Millum	1,874	49.4	
Conservative	Aphra Brandreth*	1,646	43.4	
Conservative	Helen Edward	1,539	40.6	
Conservative	Sara Gezdari	1,436	37.8	
Labour	Alec Lever	250	6.6	
Labour	Sujata Patel	242	6.4	
Labour	Ayar Ata	221	5.8	
Turnout		3,794	50.5	
Liberal Democrats gain from Conservative		Swing		
Liberal Democrats gain from Conservative		Swing		
Liberal Democrats gain from Conservative		Swing		

=== East Sheen ===
East Sheen
Party	Candidate	Votes	%	±%
Liberal Democrats	Julia Cambridge*	2,466	64.6	
Liberal Democrats	Margaret Dane	2,206	57.7	
Liberal Democrats	Zoe Mcleod	2,173	56.9	
Conservative	Brian Marcel*	1,207	31.6	
Conservative	Seamus Joyce*	1,170	30.6	
Conservative	Paul Hodgins	1,163	30.4	
Labour	Alexandra Cox	300	7.9	
Labour	Frederick Hepworth	245	6.4	
Labour	David Littlemore	244	6.4	
Turnout		3,820	51.3	
Liberal Democrats hold		Swing		
Liberal Democrats gain from Conservative		Swing		
Liberal Democrats gain from Conservative		Swing		

=== Fulwell & Hampton Hill ===
Fulwell & Hampton Hill
Party	Candidate	Votes	%	±%
Liberal Democrats	Jonathan Cardy*	2,371	63.7	
Liberal Democrats	Matthew Hull*	2,304	61.9	
Green	Caroline Wren	2,153	57.8	
Conservative	Mark Boyle	822	22.1	
Conservative	Joe Broughton	726	19.5	
Conservative	Kelly-Marie Tuthill	651	17.5	
Labour	Eva Tutchell	526	14.1	
Labour	Julian Reindorp	440	11.8	
Labour	John Edmonds	417	11.2	
Turnout		3,722	47.1	
Liberal Democrats hold		Swing		
Liberal Democrats hold		Swing		
Green hold		Swing		

=== Ham, Petersham & Richmond Riverside ===
Ham, Petersham & Richmond Riverside
Party	Candidate	Votes	%	±%
Liberal Democrats	Penny Frost*	2,171	65.9	
Liberal Democrats	Gareth Richards*	1,964	59.6	
Green	Andrée Frieze*	1,905	57.8	
Conservative	Gemma Curran†	740	22.5	
Conservative	Manuel Holden-Ayala	620	18.8	
Conservative	Alexander Kartun-Giles	605	18.4	
Labour	Monica Ayliffe	406	12.3	
Labour	Angela Smith	324	9.8	
Labour	Dmitri Jaouen-Strutt	241	7.3	
Turnout		3,293	44.3	
Liberal Democrats hold		Swing		
Liberal Democrats hold		Swing		
Green hold		Swing		

=== Hampton ===
Hampton
Party	Candidate	Votes	%	±%
Liberal Democrats	Gareth Roberts*	2,290	63.1	
Liberal Democrats	Suzette Nicholson*	2,253	62.1	
Liberal Democrats	Sam Dalton	2,242	61.8	
Conservative	Jon Slinn	1,030	28.4	
Conservative	Nina Watson	1,004	27.7	
Conservative	Petra Sale	991	27.3	
Labour	Roisin Gadd	285	7.9	
Labour	Derek Gadd	257	7.1	
Labour	Stephen Guichard	255	7.0	
Turnout		3,627	49.6	
Liberal Democrats hold		Swing		
Liberal Democrats hold		Swing		
Liberal Democrats hold		Swing		

=== Hampton North ===
Hampton North
Party	Candidate	Votes	%	±%
Liberal Democrats	Elizabeth Gant	1,654	49.6	
Liberal Democrats	Jeremy Davis	1,560	46.8	
Conservative	Geoffrey Samuel*	1,175	35.3	
Conservative	Kate Howard*	1,117	33.5	
Green	Kallon Basham	1,044	31.3	
Conservative	Nupur Majumdar	983	29.5	
Independent	Avril Coehlo*	678	20.3	
Labour	Louisa Spawls	412	12.4	
Labour	Elliot Mitchell	337	10.1	
Labour	James Johnson	314	9.4	
Turnout		3,333	45.5	
Liberal Democrats hold		Swing		
Liberal Democrats gain from Conservative		Swing		
Conservative hold		Swing		

=== Hampton Wick & South Teddington ===
Hampton Wick & South Teddington
Party	Candidate	Votes	%	±%
Liberal Democrats	Robin Brown*	2,795	71.1	
Liberal Democrats	Petra Fleming*	2,593	66.0	
Liberal Democrats	Jim Millard*	2,450	62.4	
Conservative	Hilary Dance	893	22.7	
Conservative	Grant Healy	876	22.3	
Conservative	Jon Hollis	831	21.2	
Labour	Katharine Haynes	393	10.0	
Labour	Christopher Johnson	382	9.7	
Labour	Gerard Ward	352	9.0	
Turnout		2,929	49.0	
Liberal Democrats hold		Swing		
Liberal Democrats hold		Swing		
Liberal Democrats gain from Green		Swing		

=== Heathfield ===
Heathfield
Party	Candidate	Votes	%	±%
Liberal Democrats	John Coombs*	1,521	48.8	
Liberal Democrats	Lesley Pollesche*	1,398	44.8	
Liberal Democrats	Michael Wilson*	1,349	43.3	
Labour	Nick Dexter	815	26.1	
Labour	Manju Paul	801	25.7	
Conservative	Marc Hope	799	25.6	
Conservative	George Dryja	791	25.4	
Labour	Ranjeev Walia	777	24.9	
Conservative	Jonathan Lebosquet	746	23.9	
Turnout		3,119	42.7	
Liberal Democrats hold		Swing		
Liberal Democrats hold		Swing		
Liberal Democrats hold		Swing		

=== Kew ===
Kew
Party	Candidate	Votes	%	±%
Liberal Democrats	Alice Bridges-Westcott†	2,544	62.3	
Liberal Democrats	Ian Craigie*	2,443	59.8	
Liberal Democrats	Clare Vollum	2,386	58.4	
Conservative	Sophia Fearon	1,170	28.7	
Conservative	Roger Metcalfe	1,112	27.2	
Conservative	Samuel Ennis	1,105	27.1	
Labour	Nicholas Hampson	328	8.0	
Labour	Marion White	305	7.5	
Women's Equality	Eliana Reyes	275	6.7	
Labour	Barnaby Marder	262	6.4	
Turnout		4,083	47.6	
Liberal Democrats hold		Swing		
Liberal Democrats hold		Swing		
Liberal Democrats hold		Swing		

=== Mortlake & Barnes Common ===
Mortlake & Barnes Common
Party	Candidate	Votes	%	±%
Liberal Democrats	Anton McNulty-Howard	1,878	48.0	
Liberal Democrats	Tony Paterson	1,788	45.7	
Green	Niki Crookdale	1,312	33.5	
Conservative	Paul Avon*	1,241	31.7	
Conservative	Jennifer Powers	1,077	27.5	
Conservative	Sarah-Jane Sewell	1,049	26.8	
Independent	Simon Danciger	741	18.9	
Labour	Francine Bates	733	18.7	
Labour	Deborah Genders	568	14.5	
Labour	Matthew Woolston	528	13.5	
Turnout		3,913	47.7	
Liberal Democrats hold		Swing		
Liberal Democrats gain from Conservative		Swing		
Green gain from Conservative		Swing		

=== North Richmond ===
North Richmond
Party	Candidate	Votes	%	±%
Liberal Democrats	Nancy Baldwin*	2,262	64.9	
Liberal Democrats	Richard Pyne*	2,147	61.6	
Liberal Democrats	Richard Warren*	2,141	61.4	
Conservative	Suzy Webb	798	22.9	
Conservative	Thomas Longley	761	21.8	
Conservative	Daniel Rosenschein	744	21.3	
Labour	Fiona O'Farrell	488	14.0	
Labour	Thomas Absolon	425	12.2	
Labour	Sam Cullen	393	11.3	
Turnout		3,485	46.3	
Liberal Democrats hold		Swing		
Liberal Democrats hold		Swing		
Liberal Democrats hold		Swing		

=== South Richmond ===
South Richmond
Party	Candidate	Votes	%	±%
Liberal Democrats	Chris Varley	2,158	57.4	
Liberal Democrats	Paulina Vassileva	2,114	56.2	
Green	Chas Warlow	1,756	46.7	
Conservative	Pamela Fleming*	1,340	35.6	
Conservative	Thomas O'Malley	1,210	32.2	
Conservative	Phillip Taylor	1,079	28.7	
Labour	Christina Atchison	352	9.4	
Labour	Edwin Makurah	282	7.5	
Labour	Michael Freedman	182	4.8	
Turnout		3,760	48.4	
Liberal Democrats hold		Swing		
Liberal Democrats gain from Conservative		Swing		
Green gain from Conservative		Swing		

=== South Twickenham ===
South Twickenham
Party	Candidate	Votes	%	±%
Liberal Democrats	Michael Butlin*	2,353	62.6	
Liberal Democrats	Rhi Lee	2,321	61.8	
Green	Richard Bennett*	2,048	54.5	
Conservative	Helen Marlow	893	23.8	
Conservative	David Marlow	851	22.7	
Conservative	Paul Nacmanson	765	20.4	
Labour	Laura Rollin	515	13.7	
Labour	Alexander Kingston	421	11.2	
Labour	Christopher Fawcett	372	9.9	
Turnout		3,757	50.4	
Liberal Democrats hold		Swing		
Liberal Democrats hold		Swing		
Green hold		Swing		

=== St Margarets & North Twickenham ===
St Margarets & North Twickenham
Party	Candidate	Votes	%	±%
Liberal Democrats	Katie Mansfield†	2,799	71.4	
Liberal Democrats	Ben Khosa*	2,646	67.5	
Liberal Democrats	Alexander Ehmann*	2,623	66.9	
Conservative	Ruth Porter	646	16.5	
Conservative	Paul Cavin	611	15.6	
Conservative	Keith Newman	602	15.4	
Labour	Gordon Alexander	426	10.9	
Labour	Penelope Banaji	393	10.0	
Women's Equality	Trixie Rawlinson	371	9.5	
Labour	Philip Moshi	358	9.1	
Turnout		3,920	47.4	
Liberal Democrats hold		Swing		
Liberal Democrats hold		Swing		
Liberal Democrats hold		Swing		

=== Teddington ===
Teddington
Party	Candidate	Votes	%	±%
Liberal Democrats	Charlie Engel	2,592	67.2	
Liberal Democrats	Martin Elengorn*	2,587	67.0	
Liberal Democrats	Phil Giesler	2,502	64.8	
Conservative	Janet Pell	840	21.8	
Conservative	Philip Eastment	824	21.4	
Conservative	Brian Jarvis	798	20.7	
Labour	Elizabeth Mackenzie	445	11.5	
Labour	Neil Browning	429	11.1	
Labour	Sampson Low	353	9.1	
Turnout		3,859	49.3	
Liberal Democrats hold		Swing		
Liberal Democrats hold		Swing		
Liberal Democrats hold		Swing		

=== Twickenham Riverside ===
Twickenham Riverside
Party	Candidate	Votes	%	±%
Liberal Democrats	Julia Neden-Watts*	2,405	65.4	
Liberal Democrats	James Chard*	2,260	61.4	
Liberal Democrats	Stephen O'Shea	2,128	57.8	
Conservative	Susan Chappell	853	23.2	
Conservative	Alexander Bielstein	731	19.9	
Women's Equality	Caroline Rayfield	715	19.4	
Conservative	Douge Orchard	691	18.8	
Labour	Daisy Rushton	374	10.2	
Labour	Caroline Loewenstein	303	8.2	
Labour	Adam Gladstone	291	7.9	
Turnout		3,679	47.1	
Liberal Democrats hold		Swing		
Liberal Democrats hold		Swing		
Liberal Democrats hold		Swing		

=== West Twickenham ===
West Twickenham
Party	Candidate	Votes	%	±%
Liberal Democrats	Piers Allen*	2,193	62.2	
Liberal Democrats	Laura O'Brien	2,187	62.0	
Liberal Democrats	Alan Juriansz*	2,103	59.6	
Conservative	Peter Finch	851	24.1	
Conservative	Jonny Fryer	835	23.7	
Conservative	Lily-Naomi Sale	810	23.0	
Labour	Christina Green	487	13.8	
Labour	Paul Tanto	419	11.9	
Labour	Will Tillotson	325	9.2	
Turnout		3,528	45.4	
Liberal Democrats hold		Swing		
Liberal Democrats hold		Swing		
Liberal Democrats hold		Swing		

=== Whitton ===
Whitton
Party	Candidate	Votes	%	±%
Liberal Democrats	Jo Humphreys*	2,338	65.0	
Liberal Democrats	Rob O'Carroll*	2,163	60.1	
Liberal Democrats	Kuldev Sehra	2,043	56.8	
Conservative	Jennifer Hull	1,027	28.5	
Conservative	Saba Shaukat	854	23.7	
Conservative	Sheba Sogol	842	23.4	
Labour	Ciarin Tomlin	394	10.9	
Labour	Sandra Roberts	359	10.0	
Labour	Howard Roberts	324	9.0	
Turnout		3,599	47.8	
Liberal Democrats hold		Swing		
Liberal Democrats hold		Swing		
Liberal Democrats hold		Swing		

== By-elections ==
=== Hampton North ===
Hampton North: 18 January 2024
Party	Candidate	Votes	%	±%
Liberal Democrats	Carey Bishop	1,177	53.2	▲6.4
Conservative	Nupur Majumdar	771	34.8	▼0.5
Labour	Sam Cullen	159	7.2	▼5.2
Green	Danielle Coleman	106	4.6	▼26.7
Majority		406	18.4	+8.7
Turnout		2,213	30.9	−14.6
Liberal Democrats gain from Conservative		Swing	+4.3	

=== Teddington ===
Teddington: 18 January 2024
Party	Candidate	Votes	%	±%
Liberal Democrats	Richard Baker	1,716	64.3	▲2.7
Conservative	Elizabeth Foster	561	21.0	▼0.8
Green	Chantal Kerr-Sheppard	184	6.9	New
Labour	James Thomson	163	6.1	▼5.4
Independent	Dominic Stockford	46	1.7	New
Majority		1,155	43.3	−1.9
Turnout		2,670	33.8	−15.5
Liberal Democrats hold		Swing	-0.9	
