= Nicholas True, Baron True =

British politician and life peer (born 1951)

The Right Honourable The Lord True CBE PC
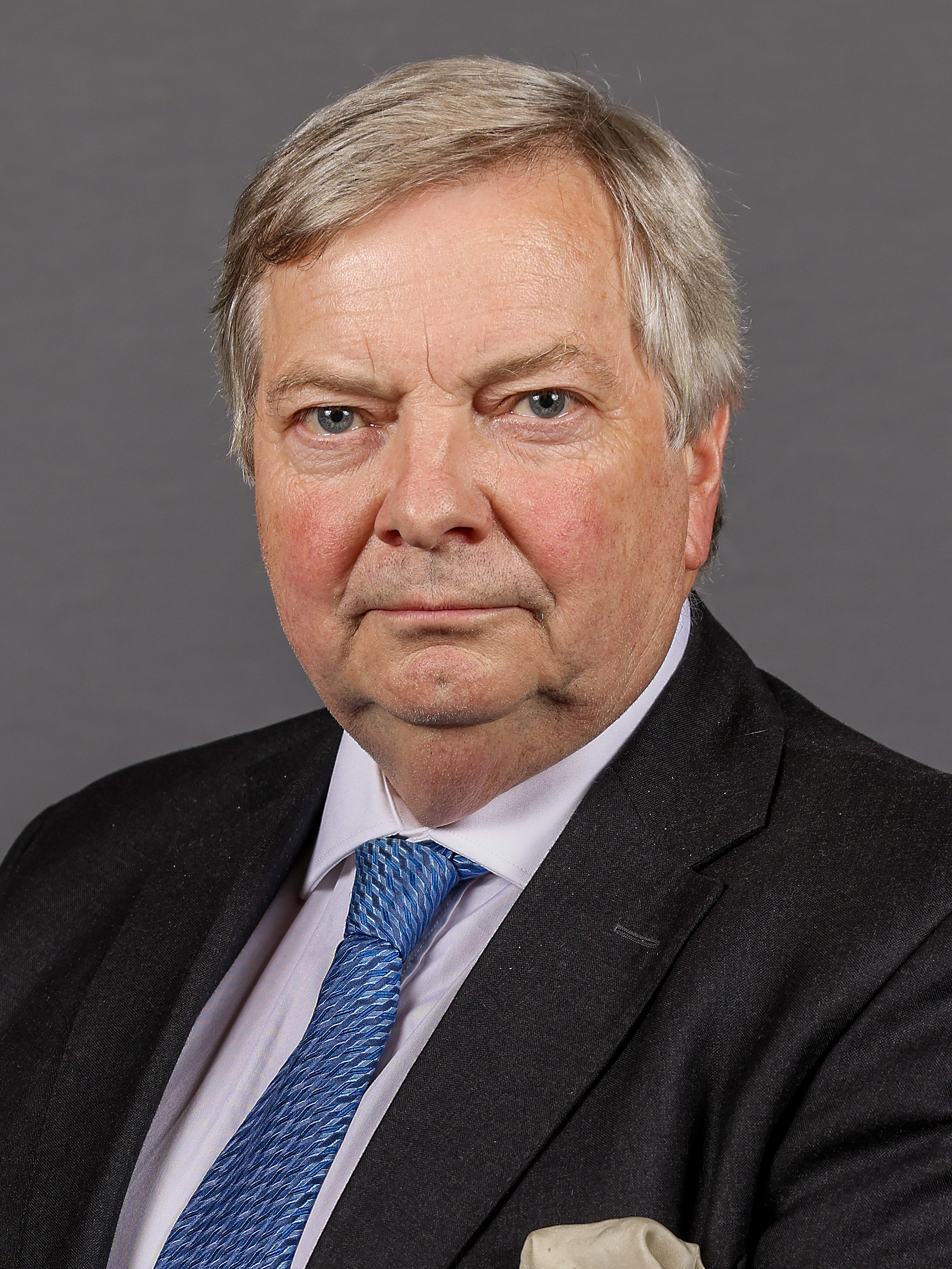
- Official portrait, 2022

Leader of the Opposition in the Lords Shadow Leader of the House of Lords
- Incumbent
- Assumed office 8 July 2024
- Leader: Rishi Sunak; Kemi Badenoch
- Preceded by: The Baroness Smith of Basildon

Leader of the House of Lords Lord Keeper of the Privy Seal
- In office 6 September 2022 – 5 July 2024
- Prime Minister: Liz Truss; Rishi Sunak
- Preceded by: The Baroness Evans of Bowes Park
- Succeeded by: The Baroness Smith of Basildon

Minister of State at the Cabinet Office
- In office 14 February 2020 – 6 September 2022
- Prime Minister: Boris Johnson
- Preceded by: David Laws (Note: As Minister Assisting the Deputy Prime Minister, 2015.)
- Succeeded by: The Baroness Neville-Rolfe

Leader of Richmond upon Thames Borough Council
- In office 25 May 2010 – 4 July 2017
- Preceded by: Serge Lourie
- Succeeded by: Paul Hodgins

Member of the House of Lords
- Lord Temporal
- Life peerage 23 December 2010

Richmond upon Thames Borough Councillor for East Sheen Ward
- In office 7 May 1998 – 3 May 2018
- Preceded by: S. Grose
- Succeeded by: Brian Anthony Marcel
- In office 8 May 1986 – 3 May 1990
- Preceded by: B. Semmens
- Succeeded by: Ms. K. Baden-Powell

Personal details
- Born: Nicholas Edward True; 31 July 1951 (age 75)
- Party: Conservative
- Spouse: Anne-Marie Elena Kathleen Blanco Hood (m. 1979)
- Children: 3
- Education: Nottingham High School; Peterhouse, Cambridge

Nicholas Edward True, Baron True (born 31 July 1951) is a British Conservative politician who served as Leader of the House of Lords and Lord Keeper of the Privy Seal between September 2022 and July 2024. He has been a member of the House of Lords since 2011 and Shadow Leader of the House of Lords since July 2024.

== Early life and education ==
True was born on 31 July 1951 to Edward Thomas True and Kathleen Louise True (née Mather). He was educated at Nottingham High School and Peterhouse, Cambridge, from which he graduated with a Bachelor of Arts (BA) degree in 1973; as per tradition, his BA was promoted to a Master of Arts (MA Cantab) in 1978.

== Political career ==
True worked in the Conservative Research Department from 1975 to 1982, also serving as assistant to the Deputy Leader of the Conservative Party from 1978 to 1982. He was special adviser to Norman Fowler, Secretary of State for Health and Social Security from 1982 to 1986. He then moved to be Director of the Public Policy Unit from 1986 to 1990. He was Deputy Head of the Prime Minister's Policy Unit from 1991 to 1995, before becoming special adviser within the Prime Minister's Office in 1997, until the general election of that year. In his memoirs the former Prime Minister John Major says that True was his favourite speechwriter. He was appointed a Commander of the Order of the British Empire (CBE) in the 1993 New Year Honours.

True served as private secretary to the Leader of the Opposition in the House of Lords and Director of the Opposition Whips' Office there from 1997 to 2010. On 23 December 2010 he was created a life peer as Baron True, of East Sheen in the County of Surrey.

In June 2021, he announced plans for the Platinum Jubilee Civic Honours in the House of Lords.

=== Public office ===
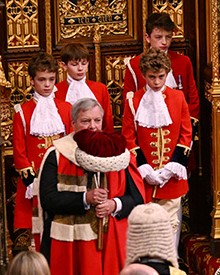
True at the 2023 State Opening of Parliament

He was a Conservative councillor in the London Borough of Richmond-upon-Thames from 1986 to 1990 and again from 1998 to 2018. He represented the East Sheen ward. He served as Leader of the Council from 2010 to 2017, having previously served as Deputy Leader from 2002 to 2006 and Leader of the Opposition from 2006 to 2010.

He has been, since 2006, a trustee of the Richmond Civic Trust, and since 1996 a trustee of Sir Harold Hood's Charitable Trust. He served the Olga Havel Foundation in the same capacity from 1990 to 1994.

In February 2020 True was made a Minister of State at the Cabinet Office.

On 6 September 2022 the Prime Minister, Liz Truss, promoted him to Cabinet and appointed him Leader of the House of Lords.

On 13 September 2022, he was sworn-in as a Member of the Privy Council of the United Kingdom.

== Personal life ==
In 1979 he married Anne-Marie Elena Kathleen Blanco, daughter of Robin Adrian Hood, director of CAFOD from 1977 to 1982, and granddaughter of the businessman and Conservative politician Sir Joseph Hood, 1st Baronet. They have two sons and one daughter.

== Notes ==
Political offices
Vacant Title last held by David Laws as Minister Assisting the Deputy Prime Minister	Minister of State at the Cabinet Office; 2020–2022	Succeeded by The Baroness Neville-Rolfe
Preceded by The Baroness Evans of Bowes Park	Leader of the House of Lords; 2022–2024	Succeeded by The Baroness Smith of Basildon
Preceded by The Baroness Evans of Bowes Park	Lord Privy Seal; 2022–2024	Succeeded by The Baroness Smith of Basildon
Party political offices
Preceded by The Baroness Evans of Bowes Park	Leader of the Conservative Party in the House of Lords; 2022–present	Incumbent
