= Twickenham Riverside =

Electoral ward in London, England

- Electoral ward for the Richmond upon Thames London Borough Council
- Borough: Richmond upon Thames
- County: Greater London
- Population: 11,383 (2021)
- Major settlements: Twickenham
- Area: 1.751 km²

Current electoral ward
- Created: 2002
- Seats: 3

Twickenham Riverside is an electoral ward in the London Borough of Richmond upon Thames. The ward was first used in the 2002 elections and elects three councillors to Richmond upon Thames London Borough Council.

== Geography ==
The ward is named after the riverside areas of Twickenham.

== Councillors ==
Election	Councillors		
2022	Julia Neden-Watts (Liberal Democrats)	James Chard (Liberal Democrats)	Stephen O'Shea (Liberal Democrats)

== Elections ==
=== 2022 ===
Twickenham Riverside
Party	Candidate	Votes	%	±%
Liberal Democrats	Julia Neden-Watts*	2,405	65.4	
Liberal Democrats	James Chard*	2,260	61.4	
Liberal Democrats	Stephen O'Shea	2,128	57.8	
Conservative	Susan Chappell	853	23.2	
Conservative	Alexander Bielstein	731	19.9	
Women's Equality	Caroline Rayfield	715	19.4	
Conservative	Douge Orchard	691	18.8	
Labour	Daisy Rushton	374	10.2	
Labour	Caroline Loewenstein	303	8.2	
Labour	Adam Gladstone	291	7.9	
Turnout		3,679	47.1	
Liberal Democrats hold		Swing		
Liberal Democrats hold		Swing		
Liberal Democrats hold		Swing		

== See also ==
- List of electoral wards in Greater London
