= Ham, Petersham and Richmond Riverside =

Electoral ward in London, England

- Electoral ward for the Richmond upon Thames London Borough Council
- Borough: Richmond upon Thames
- County: Greater London
- Population: 10,853 (2021)
- Major settlements: Ham, Petersham, Richmond Riverside
- Area: 9.274 km²

Current electoral ward
- Created: 2002
- Number of members: 3
- Councillors: Penny Frost; Gareth Richards; Andrée Frieze

Ham, Petersham and Richmond Riverside is an electoral ward in the London Borough of Richmond upon Thames. The ward was first used in the 2002 elections and elects three councillors to Richmond upon Thames London Borough Council.

== Geography ==
The ward is named after the areas of Ham, Petersham and Richmond Riverside.

== Councillors ==
Election	Councillors		
2022	Penny Frost (Liberal Democrats)	Gareth Richards (Liberal Democrats)	Andrée Frieze (Green Party)

== Elections ==
=== 2022 ===
Ham, Petersham & Richmond Riverside
Party	Candidate	Votes	%	±%
Liberal Democrats	Penny Frost*	2,171	65.9	
Liberal Democrats	Gareth Richards*	1,964	59.6	
Green	Andrée Frieze*	1,905	57.8	
Conservative	Gemma Curran†	740	22.5	
Conservative	Manuel Holden-Ayala	620	18.8	
Conservative	Alexander Kartun-Giles	605	18.4	
Labour	Monica Ayliffe	406	12.3	
Labour	Angela Smith	324	9.8	
Labour	Dmitri Jaouen-Strutt	241	7.3	
Turnout		3,293	44.3	
Liberal Democrats hold		Swing		
Liberal Democrats hold		Swing		
Green hold		Swing		

== See also ==
- List of electoral wards in Greater London
