= St Margarets and North Twickenham =

Electoral ward in London, England

- Electoral ward for the Richmond upon Thames London Borough Council
- Borough: Richmond upon Thames
- County: Greater London
- Population: 12,175 (2021)
- Major settlements: St Margarets, Twickenham
- Area: 1.963 km²

Current electoral ward
- Created: 2002
- Seats: 3

St Margarets and North Twickenham is an electoral ward in the London Borough of Richmond upon Thames. The ward was first used in the 2002 elections and elects three councillors to Richmond upon Thames London Borough Council.

== Geography ==
The ward is named after the districts of St Margarets and North Twickenham.

== Councillors ==
Election	Councillors		
2022	Katie Mansfield (Liberal Democrats)	Ben Khosa (Liberal Democrats)	Alexander Ehmann (Liberal Democrats)

== Elections ==
=== 2022 ===
St Margarets & North Twickenham
Party	Candidate	Votes	%	±%
Liberal Democrats	Katie Mansfield†	2,799	71.4	
Liberal Democrats	Ben Khosa*	2,646	67.5	
Liberal Democrats	Alexander Ehmann*	2,623	66.9	
Conservative	Ruth Porter	646	16.5	
Conservative	Paul Cavin	611	15.6	
Conservative	Keith Newman	602	15.4	
Labour	Gordon Alexander	426	10.9	
Labour	Penelope Banaji	393	10.0	
Women's Equality	Trixie Rawlinson	371	9.5	
Labour	Philip Moshi	358	9.1	
Turnout		3,920	47.4	
Liberal Democrats hold		Swing		
Liberal Democrats hold		Swing		
Liberal Democrats hold		Swing		

== See also ==
- List of electoral wards in Greater London
