= Fulwell and Hampton Hill =

- Electoral ward for the Richmond upon Thames London Borough Council
- Fulwell and Hampton Hill ward boundaries since 2022
- Borough: Richmond upon Thames
- County: Greater London
- Population: 10,719 (2021) (Note: 2021 Census data reported for 2022 ward boundaries)
- Electorate: 7,903 (2022)
- Area: 1.919 square kilometres (0.741 sq mi)

Current electoral ward
- Created: 2002
- Number of members: 3
- Councillors: Jonathan Cardy; Matthew Hull; Caroline Wren
- GSS code: E05000518 (2002–2022); E05013776 (2022–present)

Fulwell and Hampton Hill is an electoral ward in the London Borough of Richmond upon Thames. The ward was first used in the 2002 elections. It returns councillors to Richmond upon Thames London Borough Council.

== Richmond upon Thames council elections since 2022 ==
There was a revision of ward boundaries in Richmond upon Thames in 2022.

=== 2022 election ===
The election took place on 5 May 2022.

2022 Richmond upon Thames London Borough Council election: Fulwell and Hampton Hill
Party	Candidate	Votes	%	±%
Liberal Democrats	Jonathan Cardy	2,371	63.7	
Liberal Democrats	Matthew Hull	2,304	61.9	
Green	Caroline Wren	2,153	57.8	
Conservative	Mark Boyle	822	22.1	
Conservative	Joe Broughton	726	19.5	
Conservative	Kelly-Marie Tuthill	651	17.5	
Labour	Eva Tutchell	526	14.1	
Labour	Julian Reindorp	440	11.8	
Labour	John Edmonds	417	11.2	
Turnout		3,722	47.1	
Liberal Democrats win (new boundaries)				
Liberal Democrats win (new boundaries)				
Green win (new boundaries)				
