= Mortlake and Barnes Common =

Electoral ward in London, England

- Electoral ward for the Richmond upon Thames London Borough Council
- Borough: Richmond upon Thames
- County: Greater London
- Population: 12,079 (2021)
- Major settlements: Mortlake, Barnes Common
- Area: 1.807 km²

Current electoral ward
- Created: 2002
- Number of members: 3
- Councillors: Anton McNulty-Howard; Tony Paterson; Niki Crookdale

Mortlake and Barnes Common is an electoral ward in the London Borough of Richmond upon Thames. The ward was first used in the 2002 elections and elects three councillors to Richmond upon Thames London Borough Council.

== Geography ==
The ward is named after the districts of Mortlake and Barnes Common.

== Councillors ==
Election	Councillors		
2022	Anton McNulty-Howard (Liberal Democrats)	Tony Paterson (Liberal Democrats)	Niki Crookdale (Green)

== Elections ==
=== 2022 ===
Mortlake & Barnes Common
Party	Candidate	Votes	%	±%
Liberal Democrats	Anton McNulty-Howard	1,878	48.0	
Liberal Democrats	Tony Paterson	1,788	45.7	
Green	Niki Crookdale	1,312	33.5	
Conservative	Paul Avon*	1,241	31.7	
Conservative	Jennifer Powers	1,077	27.5	
Conservative	Sarah-Jane Sewell	1,049	26.8	
Independent	Simon Danciger	741	18.9	
Labour	Francine Bates	733	18.7	
Labour	Deborah Genders	568	14.5	
Labour	Matthew Woolston	528	13.5	
Turnout		3,913	47.7	
Liberal Democrats hold		Swing		
Liberal Democrats gain from Conservative		Swing		
Green gain from Conservative		Swing		

== See also ==
- List of electoral wards in Greater London
