= South Richmond (ward) =

Electoral ward in London, England

- Electoral ward for the Richmond upon Thames London Borough Council
- Borough: Richmond upon Thames
- County: Greater London
- Population: 10,981 (2021)
- Major settlements: Richmond, London
- Area: 2.661 km²

Current electoral ward
- Created: 2002
- Number of members: 3
- Councillors: Chris Varley; Paulina Vassileva; Chas Warlow

South Richmond is an electoral ward in the London Borough of Richmond upon Thames. The ward was first used in the 1964 elections and elects three councillors to Richmond upon Thames London Borough Council.

== Geography ==
The ward is named after the town of Richmond, London.

== Councillors ==
Election	Councillors		
2022	Chris Varley (Liberal Democrats)	Pauline Vassileva (Liberal Democrats)	Chas Warlow (Green)

== Elections ==
=== 2022 ===
South Richmond
Party	Candidate	Votes	%	±%
Liberal Democrats	Chris Varley	2,158	57.4	
Liberal Democrats	Paulina Vassileva	2,114	56.2	
Green	Chas Warlow	1,756	46.7	
Conservative	Pamela Fleming*	1,340	35.6	
Conservative	Thomas O'Malley	1,210	32.2	
Conservative	Phillip Taylor	1,079	28.7	
Labour	Christina Atchison	352	9.4	
Labour	Edwin Makurah	282	7.5	
Labour	Michael Freedman	182	4.8	
Turnout		3,760	48.4	
Liberal Democrats hold		Swing		
Liberal Democrats gain from Conservative		Swing		
Green gain from Conservative		Swing		

== See also ==
- List of electoral wards in Greater London
