= Kew (Richmond upon Thames ward) =

Electoral ward in London, England

- Electoral ward for the Richmond upon Thames London Borough Council
- Borough: Richmond upon Thames
- County: Greater London
- Population: 12,017 (2021)
- Major settlements: Kew, London
- Area: 3.290 km²

Current electoral ward
- Created: 1965
- Seats: 3 (since 1968); 1 (until 1968)

Kew is an electoral ward in the London Borough of Richmond upon Thames. The ward was first used in the 1964 elections and elects three councillors to Richmond upon Thames London Borough Council.

== Geography ==
The ward is named after the district of Kew.

== Councillors ==
Election	Councillors		
2022	Alice Bridges-Westcott (Liberal Democrats)	Ian Craigie (Liberal Democrats)	Clare Vollum (Liberal Democrats)

== Elections ==
=== 2022 ===
Kew
Party	Candidate	Votes	%	±%
Liberal Democrats	Alice Bridges-Westcott†	2,544	62.3	
Liberal Democrats	Ian Craigie*	2,443	59.8	
Liberal Democrats	Clare Vollum	2,386	58.4	
Conservative	Sophia Fearon	1,170	28.7	
Conservative	Roger Metcalfe	1,112	27.2	
Conservative	Samuel Ennis	1,105	27.1	
Labour	Nicholas Hampson	328	8.0	
Labour	Marion White	305	7.5	
Women's Equality	Eliana Reyes	275	6.7	
Labour	Barnaby Marder	262	6.4	
Turnout		4,083	47.6	
Liberal Democrats hold		Swing		
Liberal Democrats hold		Swing		
Liberal Democrats hold		Swing		

== See also ==
- List of electoral wards in Greater London
