= Serge Lourie =

English politician (1946–2024)

- Born: Alexander Serge Lourie; 22 February 1946; London, England
- Died: 10 September 2024 (aged 78); London, England
- Political party: Labour (until 1981); SDP (1981–88); Liberal Democrats (since 1988)
- Spouse: Julia

Alexander Serge Lourie CF (22 February 1946 – 10 September 2024) was Leader of the London Borough of Richmond upon Thames, and was a local government councillor there from 1982 to 2010. He was Chairman of the United Kingdom Housing Trust, Kingston Hospital NHS Trust and Sanctuary Housing Association. He had also been the General Secretary of Help the Aged and a board member of the London Pensions Fund Authority and the Notting Hill Housing Trust.

== Early life and education ==
Lourie was born on 22 February 1946. He was of Russian extraction and was the great-grandson of Lev Philippovitch Wolkenstein. His mother was Anna Rootchenko. He was educated at St Paul's School, London and Worcester College, Oxford (1965–68), graduating from the University of Oxford with a degree in Philosophy, Politics and Economics.

== Career ==
Lourie qualified as a chartered accountant with Cooper Brothers in 1971 (now PricewaterhouseCoopers). He was a Labour Party member of Westminster City Council (1971–74) and the Greater London Council member for Hornchurch (1973–77) where he was chair of scrutiny and vice-chair of finance.

He was elected as an SDP–Liberal Alliance councillor for Kew on Richmond upon Thames London Borough Council in 1982, becoming a Liberal Democrat following the merger of the Social Democratic Party (SDP) and the Liberal Party in 1988. In 1990, he was re-elected as a Liberal Democrat. Lourie spent fourteen years as Leader, and also served as Deputy Leader and Leader of the Opposition. He lost his seat in 2010.

In 1989 he was awarded a fellowship by the Winston Churchill Memorial Trust, studying urban renewal and housing in France and the United States. From 1990 and 1994 he chaired the London Boroughs Grants Committee, awarding grants of around £29 million to the voluntary sector in Greater London. He was a board member of the London Tourist Board where he deputised for the chairman, Sir John Egan. He chaired the Independent Panel on members' remuneration for the Association of Police Authorities and was a member of the Metropolitan Police Committee.

He was a board member of Richmond Charities and of Kew Community Trust as well as chairing Poems in the Waiting Room, a British charity providing poetry cards to doctors' waiting rooms in England and Wales. He was a patron of Cultural Co-operation, a charity that ran world music festivals. In 2015, he was appointed Chairman of the Charity Appeal Committee of Kingston Hospital to raise £750,000 to improve the treatment of patients with dementia.

== Personal life ==
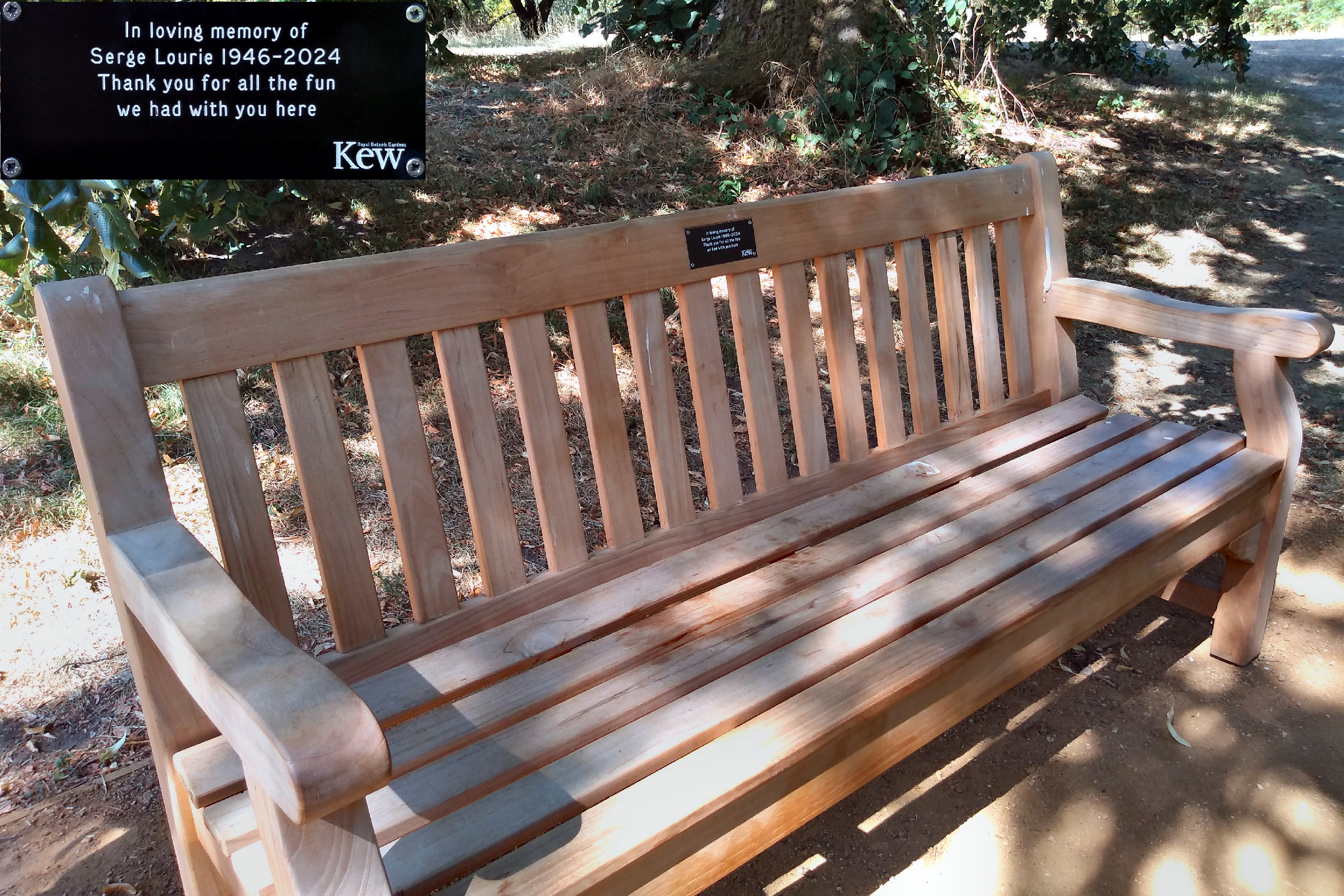
Serge Lourie memorial bench in Kew Gardens

He lived in Kew, Greater London and was married with two children. He was a keen runner, who completed five marathons, and ran frequently at Richmond Park parkrun.
