= East Sheen (ward) =

Electoral ward in London, England

- Electoral ward for the Richmond upon Thames London Borough Council
- Borough: Richmond upon Thames
- County: Greater London
- Population: 10,585 (2021)
- Major settlements: East Sheen
- Area: 5.838 km²

Current electoral ward
- Created: 1965
- Seats: 3 (since 2002); 2 (1978-2002); 3 (1968-1978); 4 (until 1968)

East Sheen is an electoral ward in the London Borough of Richmond upon Thames. The ward was first used in the 1964 elections and elects three councillors to Richmond upon Thames London Borough Council.

== Geography ==
The ward is named after the district of East Sheen.

== Councillors ==
Councillors
Nicholas True (Conservative)	(1986–1990, 1998–2018)

Election	Councillors		
2022	Julia Cambridge (Liberal Democrats)	Margaret Dane (Liberal Democrats)	Zoe McLeod (Liberal Democrats)

== Elections ==
=== 2022 ===
East Sheen
Party	Candidate	Votes	%	±%
Liberal Democrats	Julia Cambridge*	2,466	64.6	
Liberal Democrats	Margaret Dane	2,206	57.7	
Liberal Democrats	Zoe Mcleod	2,173	56.9	
Conservative	Brian Marcel*	1,207	31.6	
Conservative	Seamus Joyce*	1,170	30.6	
Conservative	Paul Hodgins	1,163	30.4	
Labour	Alexandra Cox	300	7.9	
Labour	Frederick Hepworth	245	6.4	
Labour	David Littlemore	244	6.4	
Turnout		3,820	51.3	
Liberal Democrats hold		Swing		
Liberal Democrats gain from Conservative		Swing		
Liberal Democrats gain from Conservative		Swing		

== See also ==
- List of electoral wards in Greater London
