= West Twickenham (ward) =

Electoral ward in London, England

- Electoral ward for the Richmond upon Thames London Borough Council
- Borough: Richmond upon Thames
- County: Greater London
- Population: 11,445 (2021)
- Major settlements: Twickenham
- Area: 2.457 km²

Current electoral ward
- Created: 1965
- Seats: 3

West Twickenham is an electoral ward in the London Borough of Richmond upon Thames. The ward was first used in the 1964 elections and elects three councillors to Richmond upon Thames London Borough Council.

== Geography ==
The ward is named after the district of West Twickenham.

== Councillors ==
Election	Councillors		
2022	Piers Allen (Liberal Democrats)	Laura O'Brien (Liberal Democrats)	Alan Juriansz (Liberal Democrats)

== Elections ==
=== 2022 ===
West Twickenham
Party	Candidate	Votes	%	±%
Liberal Democrats	Piers Allen*	2,193	62.2	
Liberal Democrats	Laura O'Brien	2,187	62.0	
Liberal Democrats	Alan Juriansz*	2,103	59.6	
Conservative	Peter Finch	851	24.1	
Conservative	Jonny Fryer	835	23.7	
Conservative	Lily-Naomi Sale	810	23.0	
Labour	Christina Green	487	13.8	
Labour	Paul Tanto	419	11.9	
Labour	Will Tillotson	325	9.2	
Turnout		3,528	45.4	
Liberal Democrats hold		Swing		
Liberal Democrats hold		Swing		
Liberal Democrats hold		Swing		

== See also ==
- List of electoral wards in Greater London
