= Heathfield (Richmond upon Thames ward) =

Electoral ward in London, England

- Electoral ward for the Richmond upon Thames London Borough Council
- Borough: Richmond upon Thames
- County: Greater London
- Population: 10,838 (2021)
- Area: 1.841 km²

Current electoral ward
- Created: 1965
- Seats: 3

Heathfield is an electoral ward in the London Borough of Richmond upon Thames. The ward was first used in the 1964 elections and elects three councillors to Richmond upon Thames London Borough Council.

== Geography ==
The ward is named after the district of Heathfield.

== Councillors ==
Election	Councillors		
2022	John Coombs (Liberal Democrats)	Lesley Pollesche (Liberal Democrats)	Michael Wilson (Liberal Democrats)

== Elections ==
=== 2022 ===
Heathfield
Party	Candidate	Votes	%	±%
Liberal Democrats	John Coombs*	1,521	48.8	
Liberal Democrats	Lesley Pollesche*	1,398	44.8	
Liberal Democrats	Michael Wilson*	1,349	43.3	
Labour	Nick Dexter	815	26.1	
Labour	Manju Paul	801	25.7	
Conservative	Marc Hope	799	25.6	
Conservative	George Dryja	791	25.4	
Labour	Ranjeev Walia	777	24.9	
Conservative	Jonathan Lebosquet	746	23.9	
Turnout		3,119	42.7	
Liberal Democrats hold		Swing		
Liberal Democrats hold		Swing		
Liberal Democrats hold		Swing		

== See also ==
- List of electoral wards in Greater London
