= Whitton (ward) =

Electoral ward in London, England

- Electoral ward for the Richmond upon Thames London Borough Council
- Borough: Richmond upon Thames
- County: Greater London
- Population: 10,517 (2021)
- Major settlements: Whitton, London
- Area: 1.696 km²

Current electoral ward
- Created: 1965
- Seats: 3

Whitton is an electoral ward in the London Borough of Richmond upon Thames. The ward was first used in the 1964 elections and elects three councillors to Richmond upon Thames London Borough Council.

== Geography ==
The ward is named after the district of Whitton.

== Councillors ==
Election	Councillors		
2022	Jo Humphreys (Liberal Democrats)	Rob O'Carroll (Liberal Democrats)	Kuldev Sehra (Liberal Democrats)

== Elections ==
=== 2022 ===
Whitton
Party	Candidate	Votes	%	±%
Liberal Democrats	Jo Humphreys*	2,338	65.0	
Liberal Democrats	Rob O'Carroll*	2,163	60.1	
Liberal Democrats	Kuldev Sehra	2,043	56.8	
Conservative	Jennifer Hull	1,027	28.5	
Conservative	Saba Shaukat	854	23.7	
Conservative	Sheba Sogol	842	23.4	
Labour	Ciarin Tomlin	394	10.9	
Labour	Sandra Roberts	359	10.0	
Labour	Howard Roberts	324	9.0	
Turnout		3,599	47.8	
Liberal Democrats hold		Swing		
Liberal Democrats hold		Swing		
Liberal Democrats hold		Swing		

== See also ==
- List of electoral wards in Greater London
