= South Twickenham (ward) =

Electoral ward in London, England

- Electoral ward for the Richmond upon Thames London Borough Council
- Borough: Richmond upon Thames
- County: Greater London
- Population: 10,496 (2021)
- Major settlements: Twickenham
- Area: 1.692 km²

Current electoral ward
- Created: 1965
- Number of members: 3
- Councillors: Michael Butlin; Rhi Lee; Richard Bennett

South Twickenham is an electoral ward in the London Borough of Richmond upon Thames. The ward was first used in the 1964 elections and elects three councillors to Richmond upon Thames London Borough Council.

== Geography ==
The ward is named after the district of South Twickenham.

== Councillors ==
Election	Councillors		
2022	Michael Butlin (Liberal Democrats)	Rhi Lee (Liberal Democrats)	Richard Bennett (Green)

== Elections ==
=== 2022 ===
South Twickenham
Party	Candidate	Votes	%	±%
Liberal Democrats	Michael Butlin*	2,353	62.6	
Liberal Democrats	Rhi Lee	2,321	61.8	
Green	Richard Bennett*	2,048	54.5	
Conservative	Helen Marlow	893	23.8	
Conservative	David Marlow	851	22.7	
Conservative	Paul Nacmanson	765	20.4	
Labour	Laura Rollin	515	13.7	
Labour	Alexander Kingston	421	11.2	
Labour	Christopher Fawcett	372	9.9	
Turnout		3,757	50.4	
Liberal Democrats hold		Swing		
Liberal Democrats hold		Swing		
Green hold		Swing		

== See also ==
- List of electoral wards in Greater London
