= Hampton Court House =

Private school in London, England

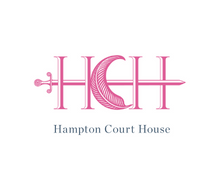

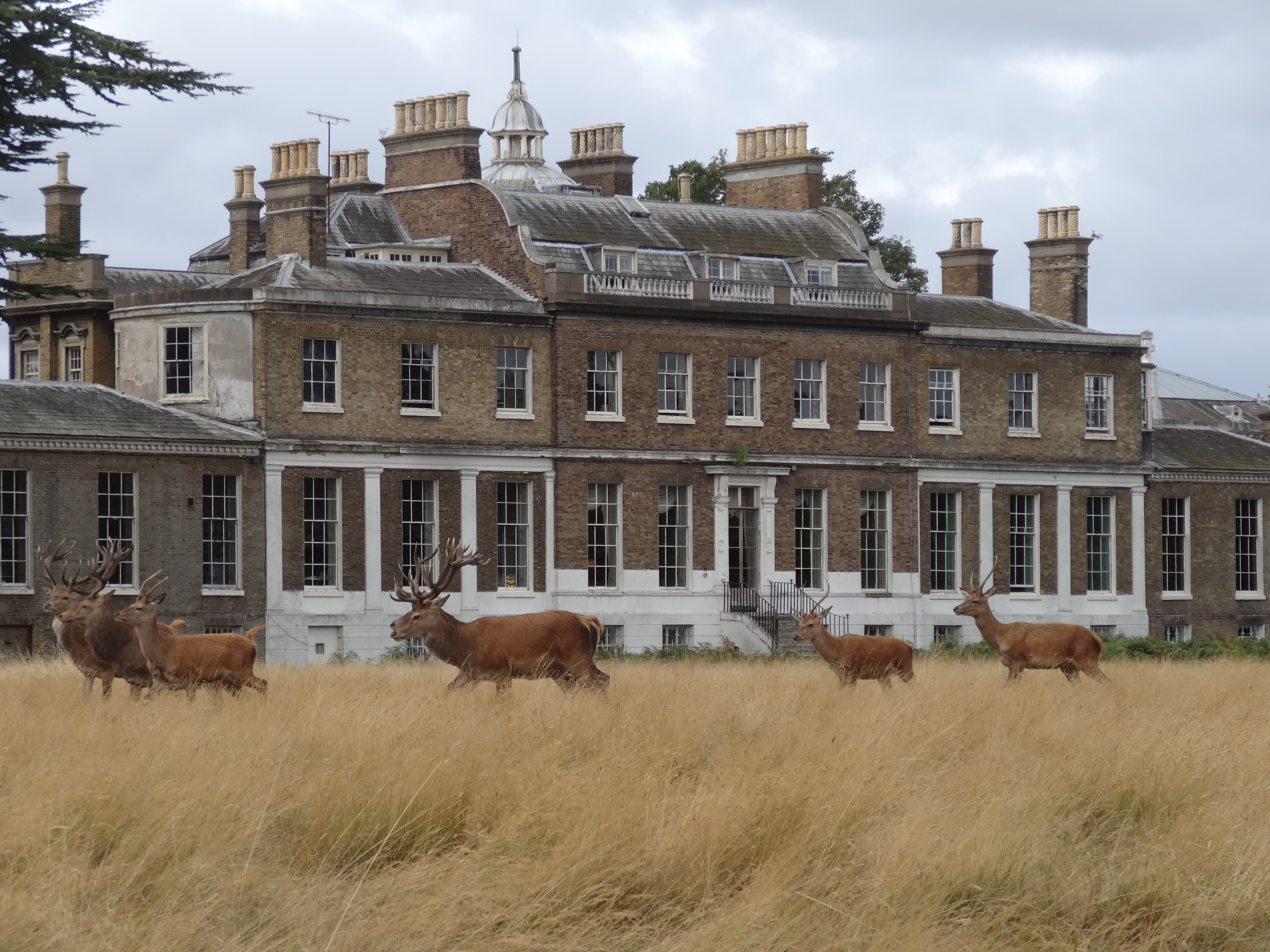

Location
- Hampton Court, London Borough of Richmond upon Thames, KT8 9BS; England
- Coordinates: 51.40817°N 0.34230°W

Information
- Type: Private day school
- Motto: Achievement With Heart
- Established: 2001
- Founders: Eliana Houstoun-Boswall and Alex Houstoun-Boswall
- Department for Education URN: 133443 Tables
- Ofsted: Reports
- Head: Katherine Vintiner
- Gender: Coeducational
- Age: 2 to 18
- Enrollment: 300
- Colours: Navy and White
- Alumni: Old Courtiers
- Website: www.hamptoncourthouse.co.uk

Designations

Listed Building – Grade II
- Official name: Hampton Court House
- Designated: 18 February 1976
- Reference no.: 1254053

Designations

National Register of Historic Parks and Gardens
- Official name: Hampton Court House
- Type: Grade II*
- Designated: 1 October 1987
- Reference no.: 1000175

Hampton Court House is a Grade II listed 18th-century building on the edge of Bushy Park in the London Borough of Richmond upon Thames. George Montagu-Dunk, 2nd Earl of Halifax, built the house in 1757. The estate is Grade II* listed on the Register of Historic Parks and Gardens.

Hampton Court House houses a co-educational private school and also hosts events such as weddings and the filming of movies.

== The school ==
Hampton Court House School, or HCH as it is popularly known, was founded by Lady Eliana Houston-Boswall and her son Alexander Houston-Boswall, after splitting from her husband Sir Alford Houstoun-Boswall in 1996; together they had previously founded The Harrodian School in 1993. Hampton Court House School opened its doors in September 2001 after extensive refurbishments.

The Sixth Form, led by former Westminster School headmaster Tristram Jones-Parry, opened in September 2015. It was the first school in the UK to start lessons in the afternoon.

In March 2021 Hampton Court House was acquired by Dukes Education Group.

== The building ==
The Grade II listed building fronts Hampton Court Green and backs on to Bushy Park. It was built around 1757 by George Montagu Dunk, 2nd Earl of Halifax, for the opera singer Mrs Anna Maria Donaldson, and was designed by architect Thomas Wright. In 1771, after the death of the Earl, it was let to the Earl of Suffolk, then to the 4th Earl of Sandwich; Charles Bingham; Admiral Lord Keith; and the 3rd Earl of Kelly. In 1883, Thomas Twining of the Twinings family of tea and coffee merchants bought the house for his daughter and her husband Auguste de Wette.

In 1971, the Teddington Theatre Club converted the picture gallery into a theatre. In the 1980s and 1990s the house was used to accommodate Vietnamese refugee children and then as a local authority care home for elderly people. In 1997-98 the BBC drama Shooting the Past was filmed at the house.

== Notable alumni ==
- Austin Dickinson, rock musician
- Ayrton Cable, social activist
- Isabella Blake-Thomas, actress
- Nell Tiger Free, actress
