= 74th Regiment of Foot (1745) =

74th Regiment of Foot Halifax's Regiment
- Active: 1745–1746
- Country: Kingdom of Great Britain
- Branch: British Army
- Type: Infantry
- Engagements: Jacobite rising of 1745

Commanders
- Colonel of the Regiment: George Montagu-Dunk, 2nd Earl of Halifax

The 74th Regiment of Foot, or Halifax's Regiment, was a regiment in the British Army from 1745 to 1746.

== History ==
In response to the Jacobite rising of 1745, the regiment was raised at Northampton by George Montagu-Dunk, 2nd Earl of Halifax. Halifax began rallying Northamptonshire's gentry in September and was appointed colonel of the new regiment on October 4. Halifax's Regiment received the rank 74th.

The 74th Foot was declared "half-complete" and considered "ready to march" on October 18. The Regiment was actually unusable in battle and the Earl of Halifax himself recognized that he was ashamed of it.

In December, the regiment was part of Cumberland's Army that successfully besieged Carlisle. In January, the regiment was ordered to garrison Carlisle.

The Regiment was then used to guard Jacobite prisoners. The Regiment left Carlisle on July 19. Heading to Northampton, it was disbanded there in the first half of August. The Earl kept his military rank of colonel.

== Uniform ==
The actual uniform of the Regiment is unknown, but most of the regiment raised by noblemen in 1745 had blue coats and red facings.
