= Anna Falkner =

Anna Maria Fa(u)lkner
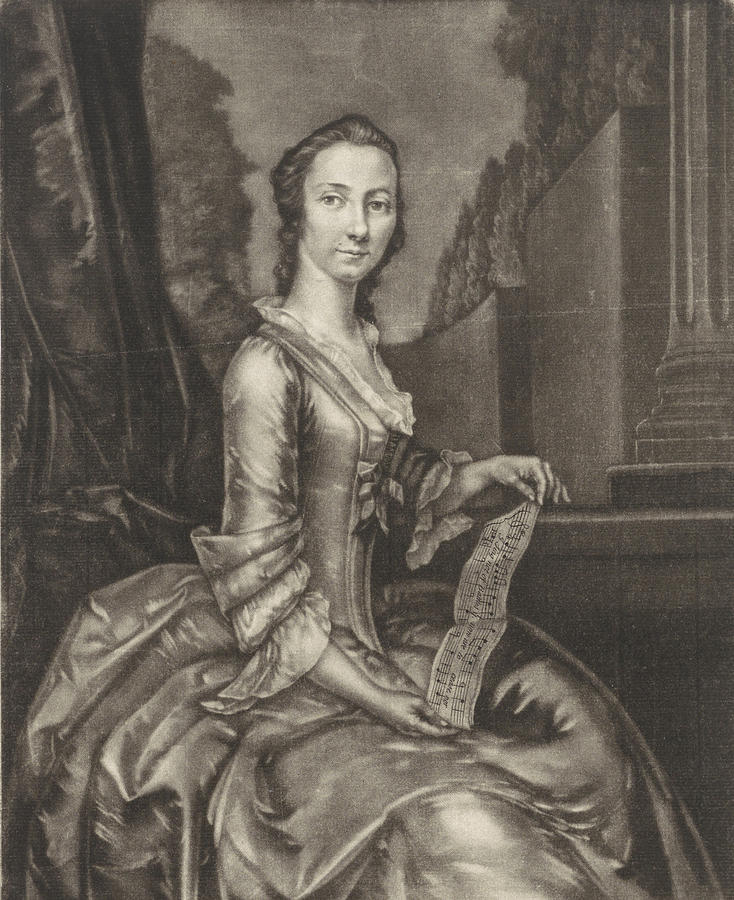
- by Andreas van der Myn
- Died: 1796 or 1797
- Other names: Donaldson & Lumm
- Occupation: Singer
- Known for: Singing and having a house built for her

Anna Maria Fa(u)lkner; Anna Maria Donaldson or Anna Maria Lumm (1714 – 1796 or 1797) was a British singer who had a house built for her by the 2nd Earl of Halifax.

== Life ==
Falkner was said to be born in 1714 and she was later adopted by the publisher George Faulkner. She came to notice when she sang at Covent Garden in November 1745. She married William George Donaldson on 19 May 1748. She had a career that lasted until 1755 singing in England and Ireland. Her portrait was made by Andreas van Der Myn.

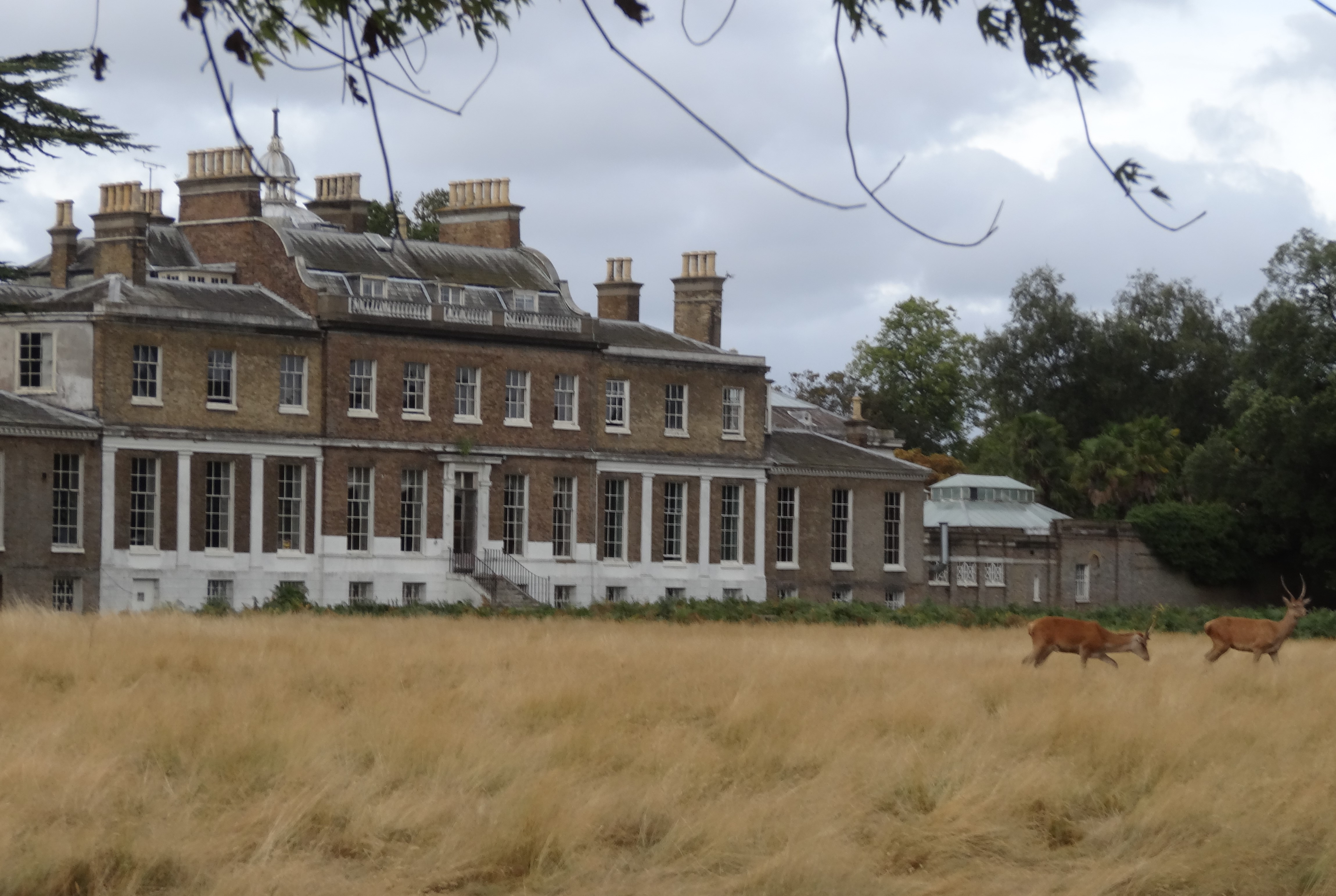
Hampton Court House today

George Montagu-Dunk, 2nd Earl of Halifax who was two years younger than her was captivated by her singing. He arranged for her unfaithful husband to be given a good job in the Caribbean, whilst he devoted his money to having a house built for her. Hampton Court House was built and it is a large house and it incorporates a grotto that is still extant. The limestone faced grotto is decorated with seashells which were said to be sent to her by her husband in Jamaica.

Halifax took her to Ireland when he became the Lord Lieutenant of Ireland in 1761. Both of them reportedly were known for offering jobs in exchange for cash until they returned to England in 1763. Halifax lived until 1771 when he was the Lord Privy Seal. He had made arrangements for Anna and their daughter in his will. Anna's husband returned from the Caribbean and died in 1780 and she went on to marry again becoming Anna Maria Lumm to a retired Major. She died in 1796 or 1797.
