= Thomas Dunk =

English ironmonger and benefactor

Sir Thomas Dunk (died 1718) was an English ironmonger and benefactor. He was appointed Sheriff of London in 1711, and served under Mayor of London Sir Richard Hoare.

Dunk lived at Tongs in Hawkhurst, Kent, England, Kingdom of Great Britain, and was from a family of 'great clothiers'. His family's wealth derived from centuries of textile production and diversification into ironmaking. The forests of Hawkshurst provided wood for smelting iron from local sandstone. In his will, Dunk endowed for Hawkhurst six almshouses, a school for twenty boys, and a house for a school master.

In 1704 Thomas married Cornelia née Palmer (1668–1717), the daughter of Ralph Palmer and Alice née White and sister-in-law to John Verney, 1st Viscount Fermanagh. There were no surviving children from the marriage.

In his will Thomas named William Richards (1690–1733), presumed to be an illegitimate son, as his executor; he left William his estate in Chieveley, Berkshire, on condition that William and his heirs took the name and arms of Dunk.

William's daughter Anne née Richards (1726–1753) - by his wife Ann née Davis (1704–1727), eldest daughter of John and Elizabeth Davis of Hawkhurst, Kent - married, in 1741, George Montagu, 2nd Earl of Halifax who took the name Dunk and became George Montagu-Dunk, 2nd Earl of Halifax.

Lord Halifax conveyed a lease on Tongs wood to Jeremiah Curteis of Rye for one thousand years, for a yearly rent of six pence. Curteis was one of the leaders of the notorious gang of smugglers – The Hawkhurst Gang. Dunk's former manor, known as Tongswood, was eventually purchased in 1945 and placed in trust in 1958 for use by Saint Ronan's School.
