= Vince Cable =

British politician (born 1943)

The Right Honourable Sir Vince Cable
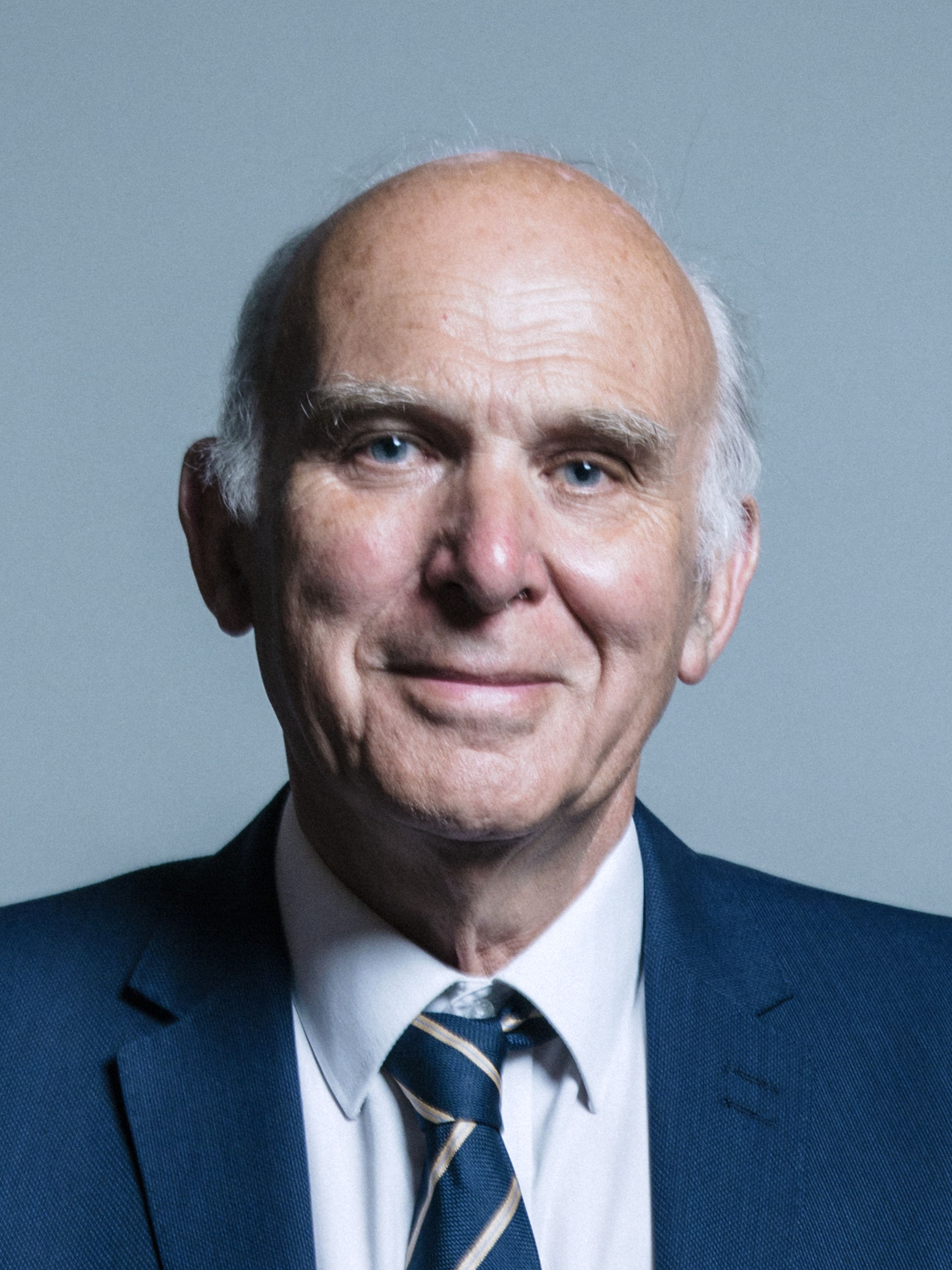
- Official portrait, 2017

Leader of the Liberal Democrats
- In office 20 July 2017 – 22 July 2019
- Deputy: Jo Swinson
- President: Sal Brinton
- Preceded by: Tim Farron
- Succeeded by: Jo Swinson
- Acting; 15 October 2007 – 18 December 2007
- President: Simon Hughes
- Preceded by: Menzies Campbell
- Succeeded by: Nick Clegg

Secretary of State for Business, Innovation and Skills President of the Board of Trade
- In office 12 May 2010 – 8 May 2015
- Prime Minister: David Cameron
- Preceded by: The Lord Mandelson
- Succeeded by: Sajid Javid

Deputy Leader of the Liberal Democrats
- In office 2 March 2006 – 26 May 2010
- Leader: Menzies Campbell; Himself (acting); Nick Clegg
- Preceded by: Menzies Campbell
- Succeeded by: Simon Hughes

Member of Parliament for Twickenham
- In office 8 June 2017 – 6 November 2019
- Preceded by: Tania Mathias
- Succeeded by: Munira Wilson
- In office 1 May 1997 – 30 March 2015
- Preceded by: Toby Jessel
- Succeeded by: Tania Mathias

Liberal Democrat portfolios
- 1999–2003: Trade and Industry
- 2003–2010: HM Treasury
- 2015: Business, Innovation and Skills
- 2017: HM Treasury
- 2019: Health and Social Care
- 2019: Cabinet Office

Personal details
- Born: John Vincent Cable; 9 May 1943 (age 83) York, England
- Party: Liberal Democrats (since 1988)
- Other political affiliations: Liberal (before 1965); Labour (1966–1982); SDP (1982–1988)
- Spouses: Olympia Rebelo (m. 1968; died 2001); Rachel Smith (m. 2004)
- Children: 3
- Relatives: Ayrton Cable (grandson)
- Education: Nunthorpe Grammar School
- Alma mater: Fitzwilliam College, Cambridge (BA); University of Glasgow (PhD)
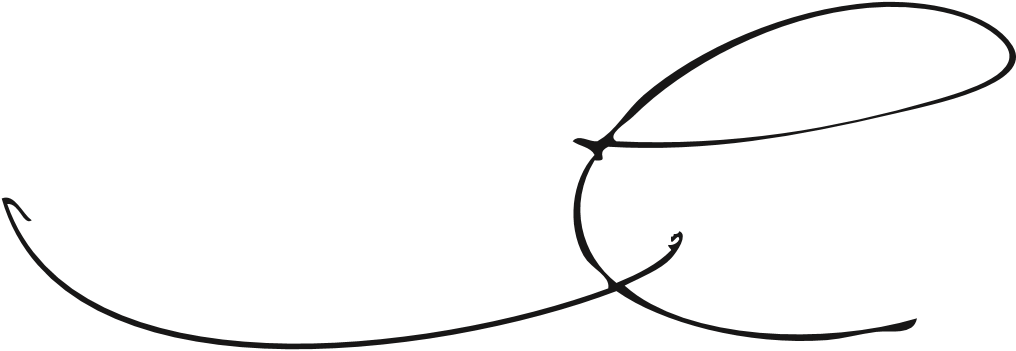
- Signature
- Website: Official website
- Cable's voice from the BBC programme Desert Island Discs, 18 January 2009
- Office vacant from 12 May 2010 to 7 January 2015. Office vacant from 12 May 2010 to 7 January 2015.

Sir John Vincent Cable (born 9 May 1943) is a British politician who was Leader of the Liberal Democrats from 2017 to 2019. He was Member of Parliament (MP) for Twickenham from 1997 to 2015 and from 2017 to 2019. He also served in the Cabinet as Secretary of State for Business, Innovation and Skills and President of the Board of Trade from 2010 to 2015.

Cable studied natural science and economics at Cambridge, and after graduation was an Overseas Development Institute (ODI) Fellow working as a finance officer in the Kenya Treasury under President Jomo Kenyatta. He then lectured in economics at Glasgow University and obtained a PhD studying part-time. He worked in the Diplomatic Service; directed research at the ODI; was a Special Adviser to the Commonwealth Secretary-General; headed the international economics programme at Chatham House; and worked for Shell Group Planning, becoming Chief Economist.

Politically, Cable was initially active in the Labour Party and served as a Glasgow City councillor in the early 1970s. He later served as special adviser to then-Trade Secretary John Smith. In 1982, he defected to the newly formed Social Democratic Party, which later merged with the Liberal Party to become the Liberal Democrats. After standing unsuccessfully for Parliament four times in Glasgow, York (twice) and Twickenham, he was elected for Twickenham in 1997. He was quickly appointed the Liberal Democrat Treasury spokesperson, and was later elected as Deputy Leader in 2006. Cable resigned from both of these positions in May 2010 after being appointed as Secretary of State for Business, Innovation and Skills in the coalition government. He lost his seat in 2015, although later regained it in 2017. Cable subsequently stood in the leadership election to replace Tim Farron, and was elected unopposed.

In May 2019, Cable led the Liberal Democrats to their best national electoral performance since the 2010 election, gaining fifteen seats in the European Parliament election. This followed a campaign in which the party ran on an anti-Brexit platform. He subsequently announced his intention to retire from politics, and stood down as leader on 22 July 2019, upon the election of Jo Swinson; he stood down from Parliament at the 2019 general election. After leaving parliament, Cable was a visiting professor in Practice at the LSE and a distinguished fellow at the ODI. He was appointed vice-president of the European Movement in 2022. He is a company director: chair of Element 2, the hydrogen infrastructure company and chair of the e-freight 2030 consortium.

== Early life and education ==
Cable was born in York, to a Conservative-supporting family. His father started his working life as a craftsman at Rowntree's and became a lecturer in Building Science at York Technical College. He became a leading figure in his Union (the NAS) and in apprenticeship training. His mother, Edith, initially packed chocolates at Terry's and later became a York Minster guide.

Cable attended Poppleton Road primary school and Nunthorpe Grammar School (now Millthorpe School) where he became Head Boy. He then attended Fitzwilliam College, Cambridge, where he initially studied Natural Sciences and later switched to Economics. He was the President of the Cambridge Union in 1965. He was also a committee member and later President-elect of the Cambridge University Liberal Club, but he resigned from the Liberal Party before taking up the office of President. Whilst at Cambridge, he was a contemporary of the Cambridge Mafia. In 1966, at the end of his studies at the University of Cambridge, Cable was appointed as an Overseas Development Institute Fellow (ODI Nuffield Fellow) working in Kenya.

He graduated in 1973 with a PhD in Economics from the University of Glasgow on economic integration and industrialisation, studying part-time while lecturing at the university. He was awarded an Honorary Doctorate at Kingston University in 2023.

== Economics career ==
After leaving Cambridge, from 1966 to 1968, Cable worked as a Finance Officer in the Kenya Treasury. Then, while lecturing at Glasgow on international economics, under Professor Alec Nove, he conducted research on economic integration working on the newly formed Central American Common Market. He was then seconded to the Diplomatic Service as a 1st Secretary working under Hugh Carless in the Latin American Department of the Foreign Office including a period attached to the CBI responsible for trade missions to South America.

He then directed research at the Overseas Development Institute working mainly on trade policy and economic development in India writing Protectionism and Industrial Decline, The Commerce of Culture and on EU trade policy. During this period, he served as Special Adviser to John Smith when the latter was Trade Secretary; a consultant to the World Bank on trade policy, working with Bela Balassa and Helen Hughes; and India author for the Economist Intelligence Unit.

He went to work, in 1983, as Special Adviser to the Commonwealth Secretary General, Shridath 'Sonny' Ramphal. He oversaw the work of expert groups on debt and on climate change and work on international capital markets leading to the establishment of the Commonwealth Equity Fund. He published, with B. Persaud, Developing with Foreign Investment.

Cable served in an official capacity at the Commonwealth Heads of Government Meeting of 1983 in Delhi, witnessing "private sessions at first hand" involving Indira Gandhi, then-Prime Minister Margaret Thatcher, Lee Kuan Yew, and Bob Hawke among others. He was also present at the summits of 1985, 1987, and 1989. In the same period, he contributed to the Brandt Commission, the Palme Commission, and the UN's Brundtland Commission.

From the 1980s onwards, Cable authored and co-wrote numerous publications in favour of globalisation, free trade, and economic integration such as Protectionism and Industrial Decline, The Commerce of Culture, and Developing with Foreign Investment.

Cable worked, in Group Planning, for the oil company Royal Dutch Shell from 1990 to 1997, serving as its Chief Economist between 1995 and 1997. His role at Shell came under scrutiny as the company was accused of playing a role in a turbulent era of Nigerian politics during the dictatorship of General Sani Abacha.

He served for a period (1993–95) as Director of the Economics Programme at Chatham House publishing work on globalisation and economic integration including the book Globalisation and Global Governance. He also wrote for the new think tank, Demos, and was one of the earliest writers to anticipate the Politics of Identity.

During his period in parliament from 1997 he wrote extensively including on economic subjects with the best-selling book The Storm (2009) on the 2008 financial crisis; and After the Storm (2016).

He was made a visiting professor of economics in 2016 at the University of Nottingham, a professor in Practice at the London School of Economics in 2021 a visiting professor at Sheffield and at St Mary's University.

In 2017, Cable became a strategic advisor on the World Trade Board for the annual World Trade Symposium co-organised by Misys and FT Live.

== Political career ==
=== Early years ===
His early life and career is detailed in the book Free Radical. At university, Cable was a member of the Liberal Party but then joined the Labour Party in 1966. In 1970, he contested Glasgow Hillhead for Labour, but failed to unseat the sitting Conservative MP, Tam Galbraith. The same year, Cable stood for election to the Corporation of Glasgow in the Partick West ward, but failed to be elected. He became a Labour councillor in 1971, representing Maryhill ward, and stood down in 1974. He was a contributor to Gordon Brown's The Red Paper on Scotland. In 1979, he sought the Labour Party nomination for Hampstead, losing to Ken Livingstone, who was unsuccessful in taking the seat.

In February 1982, he defected to the recently created Social Democratic Party (SDP). He was the SDP–Liberal Alliance parliamentary candidate for his home city of York in both the 1983 and 1987 general elections. Following the 1988 merger of the SDP and the Liberal Party, he finished in second place at the 1992 general election to Conservative MP Toby Jessel in the Twickenham constituency, by 5,711 votes.

=== Member of Parliament (1997–2015) ===
Cable entered the House of Commons after defeating sitting Conservative MP Toby Jessel in the Twickenham constituency in his second attempt, at the 1997 general election. In his first term, he was a member of the Treasury Select Committee and campaigned for the victims of financial scandals (as with Equitable Life) and for Save Our Building Societies. He later chaired the All-Party Group on the Police and for Victims of Crime. He subsequently increased his majority at the elections of 2001, 2005 and increased still further in 2010. He lost his seat in 2015, but regained it at the snap election in 2017.

In 2004, Cable was a contributor to the economically liberal Orange Book, which advocated for policies such as greater private sector involvement in higher education and healthcare. However, he has described himself as being a social democrat, as well as an "open markets" liberal, and stated his desire to reconcile "economic liberalism with wider moral values and social justice".

Following the Orange Book, Cable was one of several Lib Dem MPs who oversaw the party's shift towards economic liberalism with the adoption of a more free market approach, a development which was suggested by some as having helped lead to the 2010 coalition with the Conservatives. In 2005, as Liberal Democrat Treasury spokesperson, he suggested the possibility of the party dropping its commitment to a 50p top rate of income tax, supported exempting people on low income from income tax completely, and explored the possibility of a flat tax, with the former two proposals later becoming party policy. Also in 2005, he said that there was no future for the Liberal Democrats to the left of New Labour. He was critical of what he considered the Labour government's slow response to cutting government waste, later accusing Labour of allowing a "writhing nest" of quangos to develop.

Prior to the 2005 Liberal Democrat party conference, Cable did not rule out the possibility that the Lib Dems might form a coalition government including with the Conservatives in the event of a hung parliament at the forthcoming general election. However, party leader Charles Kennedy said that the Lib Dems would remain an "independent political force".

In late-2005 or early-2006, Cable presented Charles Kennedy a letter signed by eleven out of the twenty-three frontbenchers, including himself, expressing a lack of confidence in Kennedy's leadership of the Liberal Democrats. On 5 January 2006, because of pressure from his frontbench team and an ITN News report documenting his alcoholism, Charles Kennedy announced a leadership election in which he pledged to stand for re-election. However, he resigned on 7 January. Cable did not run for the party leadership, instead supporting Menzies Campbell's candidacy.

==== Expenses ====
Cable largely escaped criticism during the Daily Telegraph exposure of MPs 'expenses and was satirically described as 'St. Vince': "he claimed next to nothing, bought no flats, stole none of your money (and got it dead right on the economy). If only we could have St Vince". When overall MP allowances are ranked, Cable came in 568th for 2007–08 (out of 645 MPs). The Daily Telegraph also noted that he did not take a recent 2.33% salary rise.

As a Twickenham resident, Cable did not claim for a second home but commuted daily by train. However, The Daily Telegraph reported in May 2009 that he had been unaware that he was entitled to the London Supplement and so in 2004 wrote to the Fees Office to ask if he could receive retrospective payments for 2002–03 and 2003–04. The Fees Office refused the request, informing Cable that these accounts were already closed.

=== Deputy Leadership of the Liberal Democrats (2006–2010) ===
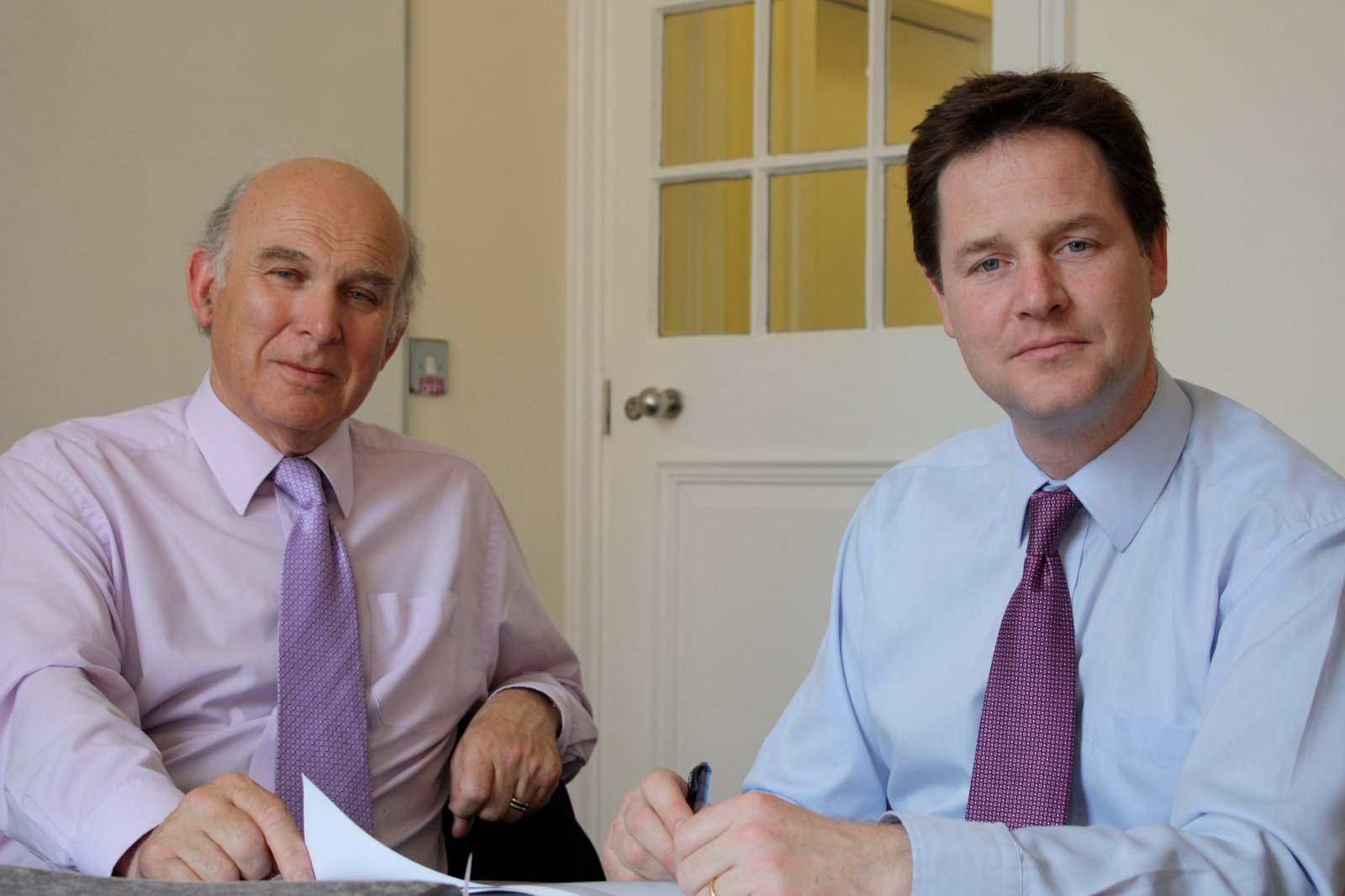
Cable with Liberal Democrat leader Nick Clegg in 2009

Cable won plaudits for his repeated warnings and campaigns on the high level of personal debt in Britain. His was a significant voice of criticism during the Northern Rock crisis, calling for the nationalisation of the bank, capitalising on the claimed indecisiveness of both the Labour Government and Conservative Opposition on the issue.

In May 2010, Cable declared his resignation as Deputy Leader to dedicate more time to his Cabinet role as Business Secretary. His responsibilities and authority were somewhat reduced when it was revealed in December 2010 that he had boasted to Daily Telegraph reporters posing as constituents of his "nuclear option" to bring the government down by his resignation. Still worse, he claimed to the reporters that he had "declared war" on Rupert Murdoch of News Corporation despite having the responsibility to impartially arbitrate on the News Corporation bid to acquire the remaining 60.9% of BSkyB it did not already own. Amid cries for his resignation or sacking, all his responsibilities concerning the bid were removed. Cable did not resign.

==== Acting leader of the Liberal Democrats (2007) ====
Following the resignation of Sir Menzies Campbell as Party Leader on 15 October 2007, Cable being Deputy Leader automatically succeeded him as Party Leader, pending a leadership election. He declined to stand for leader, reportedly fearing ageism (Campbell's critics were accused of ageism, and Cable was only 2 years his junior).

Cable received significant acclaim during his tenure as Acting Party Leader, with particular praise for his strong performances at Prime Minister's Questions. He was popular in the party and media for his attacks on the government's record over Northern Rock, HMRC's loss of 25,000,000 individuals' child benefit data and the party funding scandal surrounding David Abrahams' secret donations to the Labour Party. The latter attracted for Cable positive media attention for a joke at PMQs describing Gordon Brown's "remarkable transformation in the last few weeks from Stalin to Mr. Bean, creating chaos out of order rather than order out of chaos", called by The Economist, "the single best line of Gordon Brown's premiership".

==== Views on the 2008 financial crisis ====
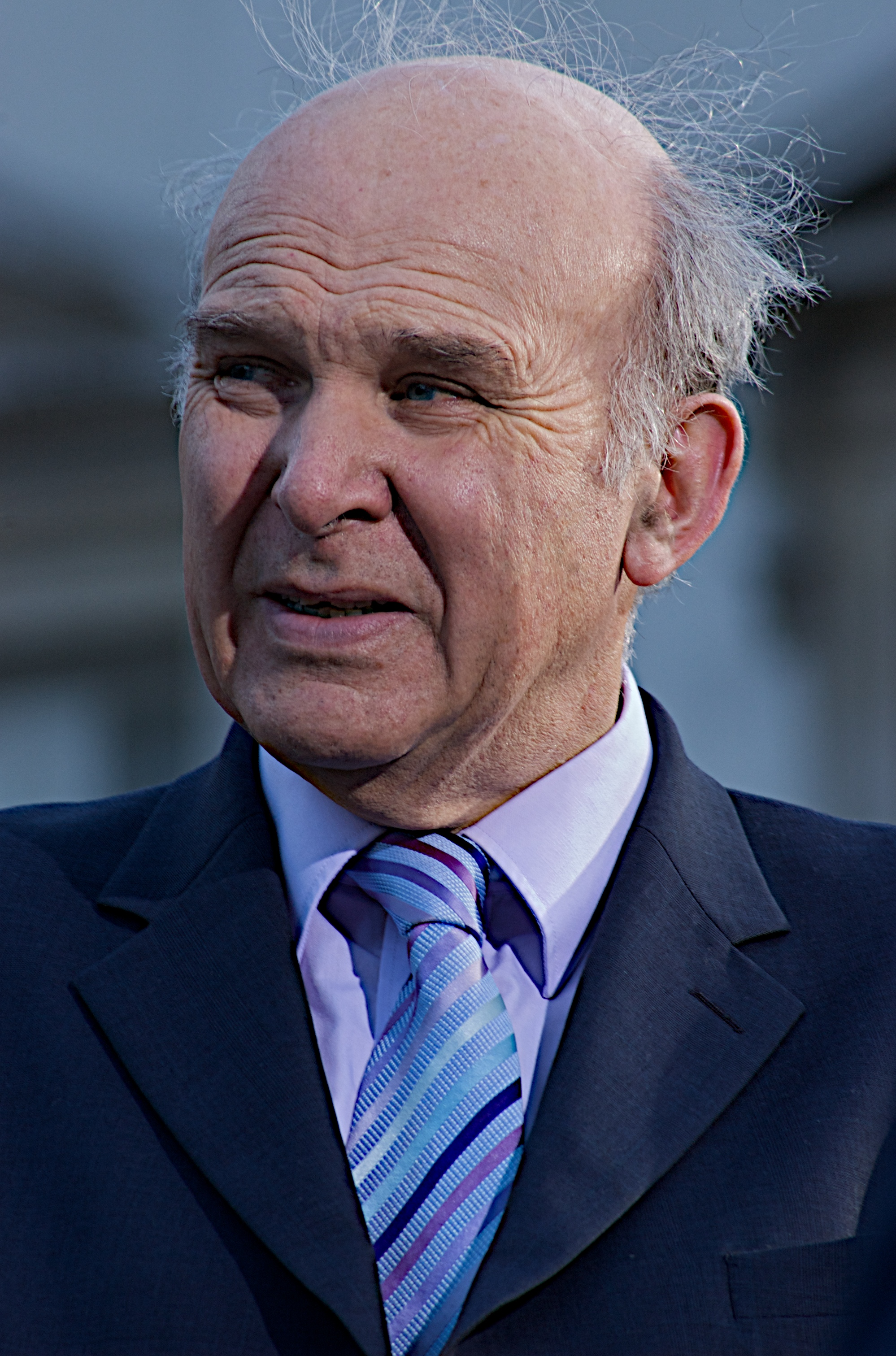
Vince Cable in March 2008

Cable is credited by some with prescience of the 2008 financial crisis. In November 2003, Cable asked Gordon Brown, then-Chancellor, "Is not the brutal truth that ... the growth of the British economy is sustained by consumer spending pinned against record levels of personal debt, which is secured, if at all, against house prices that the Bank of England describes as well above equilibrium level?" Brown replied, "As the Bank of England said yesterday, consumer spending is returning to trend. The Governor said, "there is no indication that the scale of debt problems have ... risen markedly in the last five years." He also said that the fraction of household income used up in debt service is lower than it was then."

In his book The Storm, Cable writes, "The trigger for the current global financial crisis was the US mortgage market and, indeed, the scale of improvident and unscrupulous lending on that side of the Atlantic dwarfs into insignificance the escapades of our own banks." Cable commented that he had not warned about this: "one of the problems of being a British MP is that you do tend to get rather parochial and I haven't been to the States for years and years, so I wouldn't claim to have any feel for what's been going on there."

In September 2008, Cable praised the-then US President George W. Bush for the Emergency Economic Stabilization Act of 2008 and for attempting to "save Western capitalism." He compared this with Prime Minister Gordon Brown's response which Cable claimed was to be like a "Fairy Godmother" to the banks, and a "sideshow".

Cable has also been vocal over the bonus culture in the banking system. He has called for bonuses to all bank employees to be frozen.

However, Cable has been criticised by some, mostly Conservatives, for "flip-flopping" on issues in connection with the crisis. For example, he is accused of criticising the Government's policy of Quantitative easing, when in January 2009 he used the phrase "the Robert Mugabe school of economics", while in March 2009 he said, "directly increasing the amount of money flowing into the economy is now the only clear option". The Liberal Democrats also have responded that he was making the point that QE "needed to be managed with a great deal of care".

On the issue of fiscal stimulus, Cable said in October 2008, "it is entirely wrong for the government to assume the economy should be stimulated by yet more public spending rather than tax cuts". In February 2009, however, he said, "we believe – and the Government say that they believe – in the need for a fiscal stimulus. Despite the severe financial constraints on the public sector, we believe that such a stimulus is right and necessary".

On the principle of the independence of the Bank of England, Cable made his maiden speech in Parliament on 11 June 1997 supporting Gordon Brown's decision to legislate for the Bank's operational independence. The following month, though, faced with the unprecedented collapse of the banking system, he called on the Chancellor to urge the Governor of the Bank to make "a large cut in interest rates". The Liberal Democrats have responded that this in no way changes their policy on Bank of England independence.

=== Coalition government minister (2010–2015) ===
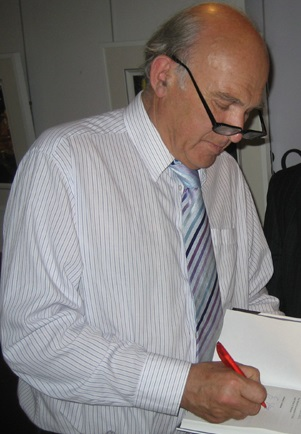
Cable autographing a copy of his book, The Storm

At the 2010 general election Cable was again returned as MP for Twickenham. With the election resulting in a hung parliament, Cable was a key figure in coalition talks, particularly the unsuccessful negotiations with the Labour Party. He strongly favoured working with Gordon Brown and reluctantly acquiesced in the decision to go with the Conservatives instead. The Liberal Democrats entered a coalition agreement with the Conservative Party on 11 May 2010, and Cable was appointed Secretary of State for Business, Innovation and Skills on 12 May. The Queen approved his appointment as a Privy Counsellor, and he formally joined the Privy council on 13 May 2010.

The major issue in which he was engaged at the outset of the Coalition was bank reform: setting in train the splitting of high risk investment banking from retail banking (which, following the Vickers Report on banking, was implemented in the form of 'ringfencing').

One of the major disagreements within the Coalition was over tax. In May 2010, Cable insisted the coalition government was not split over planned increases to non-business Capital gains tax, which some thought would raise taxes on sales of second homes by 40% or 50%. Senior Conservative MPs attacked the rise as a tax on the middle-classes and a betrayal of Conservative values. Cable said that it was a "key" part of the coalition deal and there was no disagreement over it between the coalition partners. Cable said the changes to Capital Gains Tax would help to fulfill the Lib Dem aim of bringing more "fairness" to the tax system: "It's very important that we have wealth taxed in the same way as income." He continued,

At present it is quite wrong and it is an open invitation to tax avoidance to have people taxed at 40% or potentially 50% on their income, but only taxed at 18% on capital gains; it leads to large scale tax avoidance so for reasons of fairness and practicality, we have agreed that the capital gains tax system needs to be fundamentally reformed."

In May 2010, Cable declared his resignation as Deputy Leader to dedicate more time to his Cabinet role as Business Secretary. His responsibilities and authority were somewhat reduced when it was revealed in December 2010 that he had boasted to Daily Telegraph reporters posing as constituents of his "nuclear option" to bring the government down by his resignation. Still worse, he claimed to the reporters that he had "declared war" on Rupert Murdoch of News Corporation despite having the responsibility to impartially arbitrate on the News Corporation bid to acquire the remaining 60.9% of BSkyB it did not already own. Amid cries for his resignation or sacking, all his responsibilities concerning the bid were removed. Cable did not resign.

In July 2010, Cable sought to reform credit lines amid a "significant demand" (according to the Forum of Private Business) of smaller firms finding it harder to secure loans. Among a range of proposals published in a green paper, Cable urged banks to limit bonus and dividend payments to "pre-crisis and 2009 levels respectively", the green paper stating that such a move would enable banks to retain £10,000,000,000 of additional capital in 2010 could in turn sustain £50,000,000,000 of new lending. Concrete results included an agreement by the banks to finance a Business Growth Fund which has since invested £4 billion in 'patient capital' in growing firms. Agreement followed in 2012 to establish the British Business Bank with £1 billion of government money. Formally established in 2014 it was investing £3.5 of public money in small business a decade later. He was however seen as being vindicated when the story emerged in July 2011 of the News International ‘hacking’ scandal'. He was attacked from both right and left. He was deemed as an 'anti-Business Secretary'.

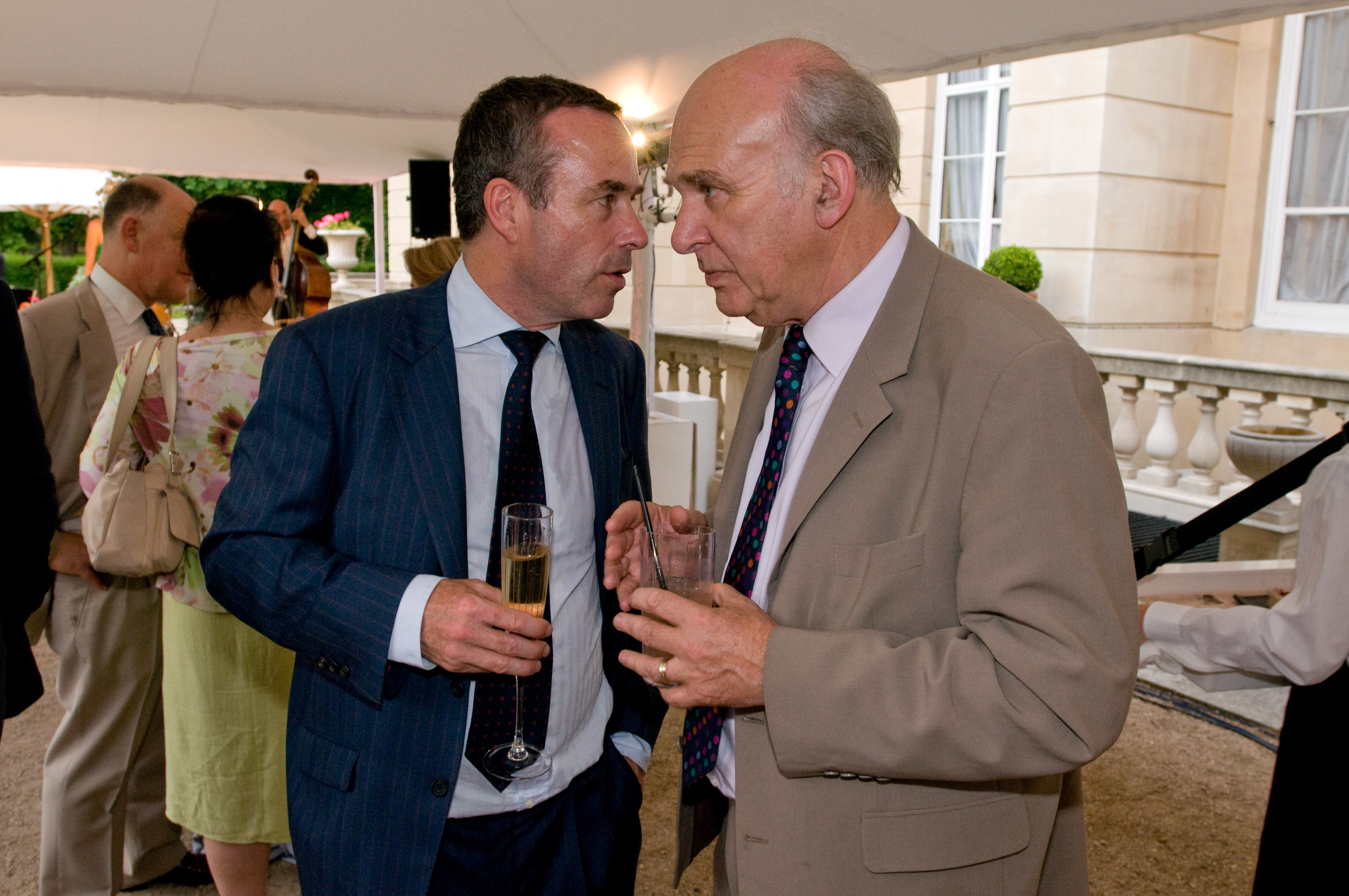
Cable with Financial Times editor Lionel Barber in 2011

The left-leaning parts of the British press have been critical of his role in the Coalition Government, from The Guardian to the Morning Star describing him as "the man who started off a Lib Dem and now looks more convincingly Tory than most of the Tory frontbench" for his role in supporting public spending cuts.

Beginning in 2010 and continuing throughout the Conservative-Lib Dem coalition's tenure in office, Cable led the drive for deregulation; notably the "Red Tape Challenge" to reduce existing regulation and the "One In, One Out" rule to limit any future regulation, Cable agreeing with the need for a "bonfire of regulations". The Guardian dubbed this as "neoliberal" while the response from the business community was largely positive. The right-leaning press took the opposite view: "Socialist Cable not fit for office. Business Secretary and fellow Lib Dems are damaging the economy with objections to cutting red tape, warns no. 10 adviser."

He was in prolonged dispute with the leading banks over their reluctance to lend to small and medium-sized business. A party conference speech in September 2010 attracted particular attention, positive and negative: "On banks I make no apology for attacking spivs and gamblers who have done more harm to the British economy than Bob Crowe in all his Trotskyite fantasies while paying themselves outrageous bonuses underwritten by the taxpayer" attacked as 'banker-bashing' by the Daily Telegraph. He argued that the Coalition should focus on long term industrial strategy rather than deregulation, attacking 'backward looking Tory right-wingers and their ridiculous and bizarre claim that the key to economic growth in the UK lies through more business deregulation' which earned him the moniker 'Twickenham's Karl Marx'. The Industrial Strategy was launched in 2011. It formed a major part of his ministerial legacy and had enduring importance through the Aerospace Growth Partnership, the Catapult Network.

In September 2010, during a speech at the Liberal Democrat conference, Cable said that bankers present more of a threat to Britain than trade unions.

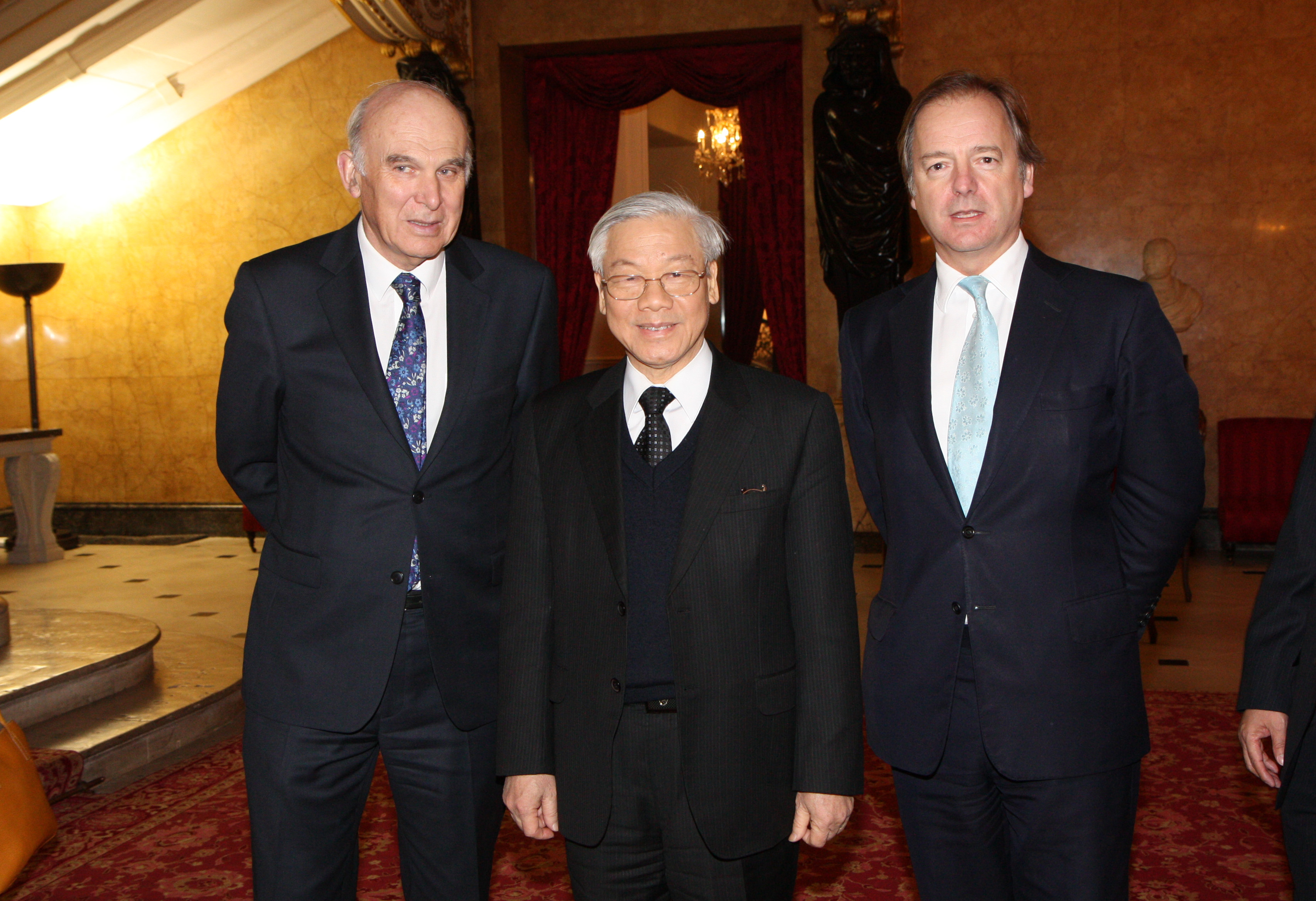
Cable and Hugo Swire with Nguyễn Phú Trọng, General Secretary of the Communist Party of Vietnam, London, 2013

After the interim report on banking by John Vickers was published in April 2011, Cable said: "I was very impressed with the quality of the analysis. It does address head on the issue of banks that are too big to fail, the dependency on the government guarantee. It makes the case for separation," he added.

In June 2011, Cable said "rewards for failure" were unforgivable at a time when real wages were being squeezed across the country. Speaking at the Association of British Insurers biennial conference, Cable warned he planned to bring "excessive and unjustified" executive pay under control by launching a fresh consultation. He said that although "Britain does have some world-class executives", investors had not seen a return "since the turn of the century" and claimed executive pay was 120 times that of the average UK employee, whereas it was only 45 in 1998. Cable introduced legislation that would require companies to publish "more informative remuneration reports" for shareholders. The plans also included binding votes by shareholders on executive pay as well as greater transparency and diversity on boards.

In November 2011, Cable announced the first of several reforms to employment laws. Beginning with changes to the tribunal system, he proposed the introduction of tribunal fees for employees making claims against employers, stating that the current system had become a "major impediment" to small businesses hiring people. The tribunal fees introduced by the Justice Secretary, Chris Grayling, were later ruled unlawful by the Supreme Court in 2017 after a court victory by trade union UNISON.

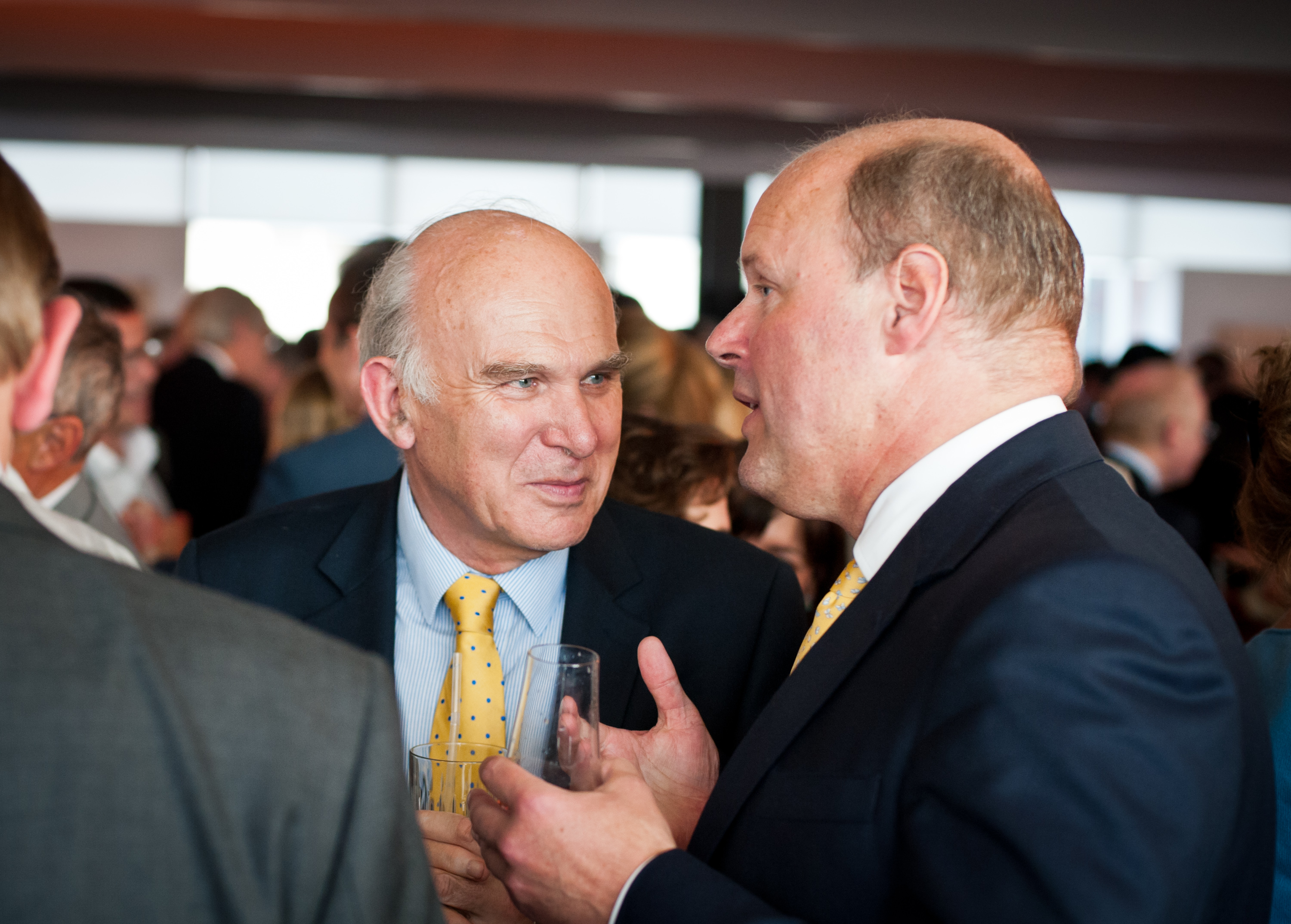
Cable with former banker and CEO Stephen Hester in 2013

In an article in May 2012, Cable denounced the "red tape factories" of the European Union, calling for increased deregulation and labour market flexibility, as well as the expansion of the Single Market and scrapping of the Working Time Directive. He revealed that at a recent meeting of European economic ministers, a group of like-minded nations had formed in making these same demands.

In September 2012, Cable and his department colleague Michael Fallon announced a large package of deregulation for businesses, including scrapping 3,000 regulations and implementing exemptions from health and safety inspections for shops, pubs, and offices. Cable claimed that businesses should not be "tied up in unnecessary red tape", but the move was criticised by trade unions. Days later Cable announced further deregulation involving changes to employment laws, proposing to reduce employee compensation for unfair dismissals and allowing employers and employees to agree to an out-of-court 'pay off' for under-performance dismissals. This was also criticised by trade unions. Cable was however attacked by the right-leading press for refusing to accept the recommendations of a Tory donor Adrian Beecroft for ‘no fault dismissal’: in effect firing at will subject to compensation.

In January 2013, Cable rejected calls by Labour for the government to intervene in the high street crisis following the collapse of music retailer, HMV, he said: "it is not the job of Government to sort out the problems of competition on the high street. Consumers make their choices and there are consequences." In December 2013, Cable supported the continuation of zero hours contracts after a government review, saying "they have a place in today's labour market", although admitting there had "been evidence of abuse." His statements were met with negative responses from British trade unions. He introduced legislation to outlaw abusive zero-hours contracts such as those where employers had imposed exclusivity conditions.

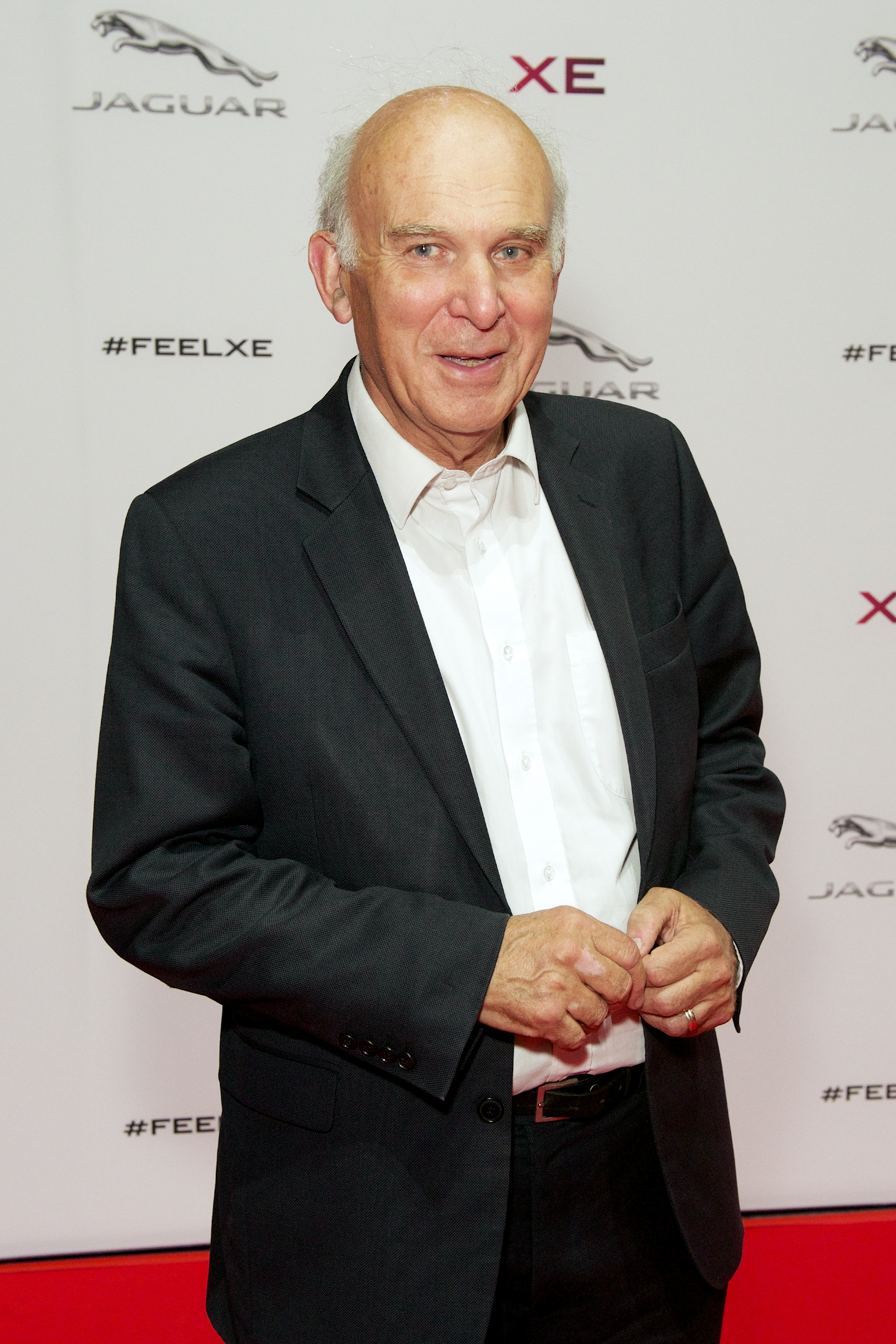
Cable making a guest appearance for the reveal of Jaguar XE at the Earls Court Exhibition Centre in 2014

In 2014, during the Israel-Gaza conflict, Cable received criticism for his involvement in the signing off of arms deals to Israel, primarily concerning component parts used in the assembly of Hermes drones. Shortly afterwards, he announced that arms exports to Israel would be suspended unless the recently declared ceasefire was upheld, a response which was condemned by Baroness Warsi, and by the CAAT who called it "very weak".

In February 2015, Cable was reportedly a speaker at an event hosted by various arms companies at a London hotel.

In 2015, Cable refused to issue export licences for the sale of Paveway IV laser-guided bomb to the Royal Saudi Air Force over concern about how they might be used in the Saudi Arabian-led intervention in Yemen. Cable came under pressure from then-Prime Minister David Cameron, Defence Secretary Michael Fallon and Foreign Secretary Philip Hammond for the immediate resumption of exports. Cable stated he was then given specific assurances by the Ministry of Defence that the UK would be given oversight of potential bombing targets to minimise the risk of civilian casualties, including involvement in decisions, to a similar level given to the United States. On this understanding, Cable agreed to issue export licences for a £200,000,000 order for the weapons. In 2016, it became apparent the Ministry of Defence did not have this level of oversight, to which Cable responded "That is categorically contrary to what I was told was going to happen." The sale is being investigated by the Committees on Arms Export Controls. As part of his responsibilities for export licensing Cable introduced a ban on the export of three pharmaceutical drugs used in the US to execute prisoners on death row.

Cable also introduced a wide range of other legislation: to introduce shared parental leave (Shared Parental Leave, Working Families); a register of beneficial ownership (House of Commons Library Registers of Beneficial Ownership); a strengthening of copyright protection (the Intellectual Property Act 2014); the protection of supermarket suppliers (Grocery Code Adjudicators Act 2013); and the protection of pubs from pubcos.

==== December 2010 Daily Telegraph comments ====
In late-December 2010, undercover reporters from The Daily Telegraph, posing as constituents, set up a meeting with Cable, who expressed frustration with being in the coalition and compared it to "fighting a war"; he stated he had "a nuclear option... if they push me too far then I can walk out and bring the government down and they know that", and had to "pick" his fights carefully. He also claimed the Liberal Democrats had pressed for a "very tough approach" to the UK's banks, which had been opposed by the Conservatives. He described the coalition's attempt at fast, widespread reforms (including the health service and local governments) as being a "kind of Maoist revolution", and thought "we [the Government] are trying to do too many things... a lot of it is Tory inspired. The problem is not that they are Tory-inspired, but that they haven’t thought them through. We should be putting a brake on them." When his comments appeared in the press, Cable stated, "Naturally I am embarrassed by these comments and I regret them", before reaffirming his commitment to the Coalition Government, stating that "I am proud of what it is achieving".

In part of the Daily Telegraph transcript that it did not disclose, Cable stated in reference to Rupert Murdoch's News Corporation takeover bid for BSkyB, "I have declared war on Mr Murdoch and I think we are going to win." Following this revelation, Cable had his responsibility for media affairs – including ruling on Murdoch's takeover plans – withdrawn from his role as Business Secretary. In May 2011, the Press Complaints Commission upheld a complaint regarding the Telegraph's use of subterfuge.

Cable's stature in the Government grew since then, being dubbed "the moral centre of this Coalition" by Peter Oborne, chief political commentator at the Daily Telegraph.

==== Royal Mail sale ====
As Business Secretary, Cable oversaw the privatisation of the Royal Mail in 2013. The share price increased by 38% within a day and 70% in a year. The National Audit Office said that the Department for Business, Innovation and Skills was too cautious when setting the sale price, but that a planned postal workers' union strike also affected the government's sale price. Cable refused to apologise, and said that the Government had been right to take a cautious approach, pointing out that the sale had raised £2,000,000,000 for the taxpayer, with a further £1,500,000,000 from the 30% stake in Royal Mail which it had retained. The NAO also noted that some "priority investors", had made significant profits following the sale, having been allocated more shares in the belief that they would form part of a stable and supportive shareholder base. However, almost half of the shares allocated to them had been sold within a few weeks of the sale. Cable invited the independent Labour peer and financier Lord Myners to conduct a review of the sale. He was critical of some technical aspects of the sale but concluded that there had been little undervaluation.

=== Post-ministerial career ===
Cable lost his seat, previously considered safe – with a majority of 12,140 – to the Conservative candidate Tania Mathias at the 2015 general election. Mathias won with a majority of 2,017 votes. He had the longest tenure as President of the Board of Trade since that of Peter Thorneycroft, which ended in 1957.

=== Return to parliament ===
Cable announced on 18 April 2017 his intention to stand for his former seat of Twickenham at the snap general election. In May 2017, Cable urged Liberal Democrat supporters to vote tactically for Ealing Central and Acton Labour candidate Rupa Huq. At the election, he was successful in winning back his former seat, with a majority of 9,762 votes.

In a cross-party effort shortly after the election, Cable along with former Labour Party Leader Ed Miliband and veteran Conservative MP Ken Clarke made a joint submission to Ofcom, opposing 21st Century Fox's takeover bid of Sky.

Following Tim Farron's resignation as leader of the Liberal Democrats, Cable announced his candidacy in the subsequent leadership election.

In July, he called for pro-EU MPs to support and "rally around" Chancellor Philip Hammond.

== Leader of the Liberal Democrats ==
On 20 July 2017, Cable became leader of the Liberal Democrats after facing no competition. He was the oldest leader of a major UK political party since Sir Winston Churchill.

=== Policies ===
In a manifesto released upon his ascent to leadership, Cable revealed his policy priorities as Liberal Democrat leader would include tackling inequality, improving public services, opposing Brexit, electoral reform and young people.

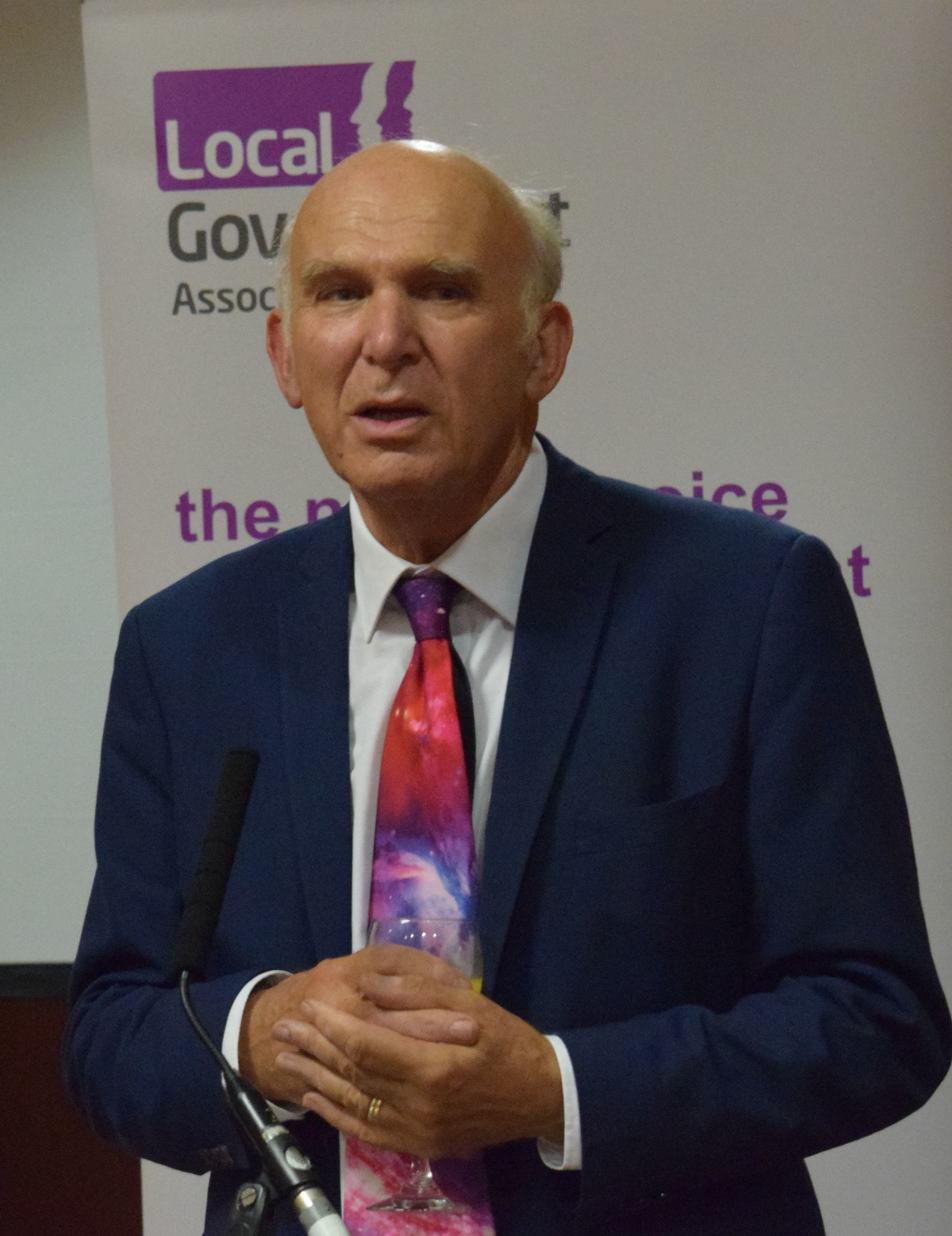
Cable addressing a Liberal Democrat fringe meeting in 2018

In late 2017 Cable revealed that he had become "more interventionist" economically due to experiences while in the Coalition government. Subsequently, Cable has called for the blocking of several foreign takeovers of UK companies in the technology sector, and for the reform of UK takeover laws in the form of the 'Cadbury Clause' that had been suggested by figures within the Conservative Party. Following the leak of the Paradise Papers, Cable commented that direct rule of Crown Dependencies should be threatened if substantial progress was not made in curbing aggressive tax avoidance.

In September 2017 Cable echoed Foreign Secretary Boris Johnson in calling for greater taxation of foreign speculators in the housing market. He has also called for the reform of empty dwelling management orders.

In an 8 November 2017 pre-Budget speech at the City of London, Cable announced the Liberal Democrats under his leadership would seek to revive the fiscal Golden Rule of former Labour Chancellor Gordon Brown.

In early 2018, Cable's leadership saw former Conservative donors Peter J Stringfellow and Charlie Mullins switch and pledge their support to Cable and the Liberal Democrats over Brexit.

On education, Cable has rejected cutting or abolishing university tuition fees. He has instead announced that he would seek to implement lifelong learning accounts which would serve as endowments to all young people to help pay for education or training at any future date, and suggested this endowment could range from £5,000 to £10,000 per head (the average university student debt in England is £50,800 upon graduation as of 2017), costing around £10 billion a year. Cable claimed the policy could be funded from reform of capital gains, inheritance, and property taxes. Also on education, he proposes to abolish the Ofsted inspectorate and reform school league tables to focus on pupil well-being rather than exam results because a “change in emphasis” is needed away from competition. He supported the February 2018 USS strikes, calling for the government to underwrite lecturers' pensions, while refusing to cross a picket line at the Cass Business School.

On 22 March, Cable announced that at an earlier meeting of European liberal parties he had garnered the signed agreements of eight European ALDE Prime Ministers demanding another referendum on the terms of Britain's exit from the European Union. Shortly after, however, in contradiction to Cable's announcement ALDE issued a statement denying that there had been any joint agreement about backing another referendum.

In June, Cable set out plans to create a state land-buying agency to compulsorily purchase land at 40% below market value. Cable also unveiled a proposal to develop a sovereign wealth fund, totalling £100 billion of assets, to be paid for partly by a tax on gifts.

In response to both the 2017 and 2018 Autumn Budget announcements, Cable called for a large increase in public services spending and the end of austerity, attacking the Conservative government's 2018 Autumn Budget for failing to meet his demands on increased spending. He criticised Labour for not voting against a package of Conservative tax cuts which included raising the personal income tax allowance and higher rate income tax threshold, money that he argued would be better used on reversing cuts to benefits.

=== Commentary ===
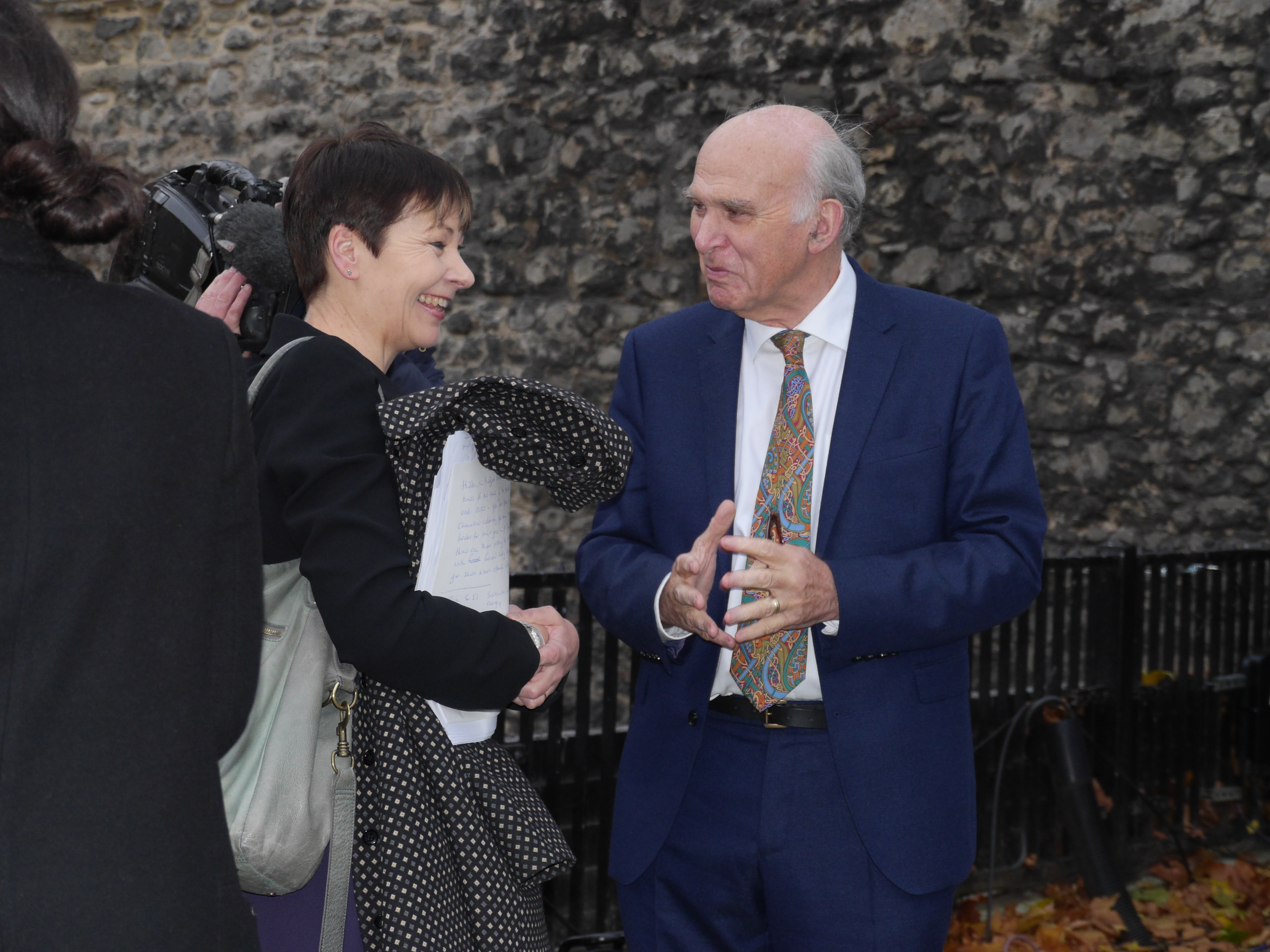
Cable as leader of the Liberal Democrats with Green MP Caroline Lucas

Electorally, Cable asserted that the Liberal Democrats under his leadership would win over substantial numbers of younger Labour voters "when the penny drops" about Labour's stance on Brexit, and that "young supporters will soon notice". Aside from Brexit, he claimed that adopting and pitching policies like higher taxation of wealth would also help in winning over Labour voters. Despite this, the Liberal Democrats under Cable's leadership drew observations from numerous political commentators such as Stephen Bush of New Statesman and John Rentoul of The Independent who noted that Liberal Democrat national polling had remained static even with significantly negative public perceptions of both the Labour and Conservative parties. Rentoul, as well as politics historian Glen O'Hara pointed to traditional and once potential Liberal Democrat voters Cable might wish to target as now having become solidly Labour voters. The Times Red Box editor and columnist Matt Chorley, in assessing Cable's leadership, wrote how there was already a "grey-haired nasal leftie running an opposition party" (in reference to Jeremy Corbyn) and therefore Cable was not needed.

Cable has received significant critical commentary surrounding his leadership of the Liberal Democrats in terms of policy proposals and stances. In particular, Cable's support for a second referendum on membership of the European Union and his comment that older Brexit voters were driven by nostalgia were met with negative reactions from the likes of broadcaster Julia Hartley Brewer, government Cabinet member Sajid Javid, and others. However, some in the media have expressed agreement with Cable's position on Brexit. Other policy, such as punitive taxation of foreign housing investors was criticised by the Adam Smith Institute think tank. The Financial Times considered Cable to be part of a "coalition of anti-capitalists" due to his calls for foreign takeovers of British companies to be blocked, and in The Daily Telegraph his policies were likened unfavourably to those of the Labour Party. Political journalist Andrew Rawnsley of The Observer was critical of Cable's general approach but conceded the possibility of Cable's anti-Brexit policy paying off eventually.

On 7 September 2018, after suffering a minor stroke, Cable announced his intention to resign as leader of the Liberal Democrats. He initially said he would resign once Brexit has been resolved or stopped, and when his proposed party reforms had been accepted, but in March 2019, he said that he would resign in May 2019 after the local elections. In the event, he presided over the best Lib Dem council elections for two decades, gaining 700 seats and 11 councils research. He adopted the slogan 'Bollocks to Brexit' in the June European elections when the Lib Dems won 16 seats with 20% of the popular vote. Following the 2019 European Parliament election in the United Kingdom, he confirmed on 24 May that he would stand down on 23 July 2019.

== Views ==
Cable has compared himself to centrist French President Emmanuel Macron, saying that as Business Secretary he had worked with Macron (then an economy minister) personally and that they have a "very similar" approach. He believes his party should occupy the "vast middle ground", likening the political conditions of the UK with those of France. Cable asserts that there is an "appetite" for "middle-of-the-road politics" which he claims he can provide, and has decried what he sees as the mistreatment of “middle-of-the-road Brownite type” politicians like Tom Watson by the "hard left" within the Labour Party.

He is a supporter of the Social Liberal Forum, a centre-left group within the Liberal Democrats.

=== Trade ===
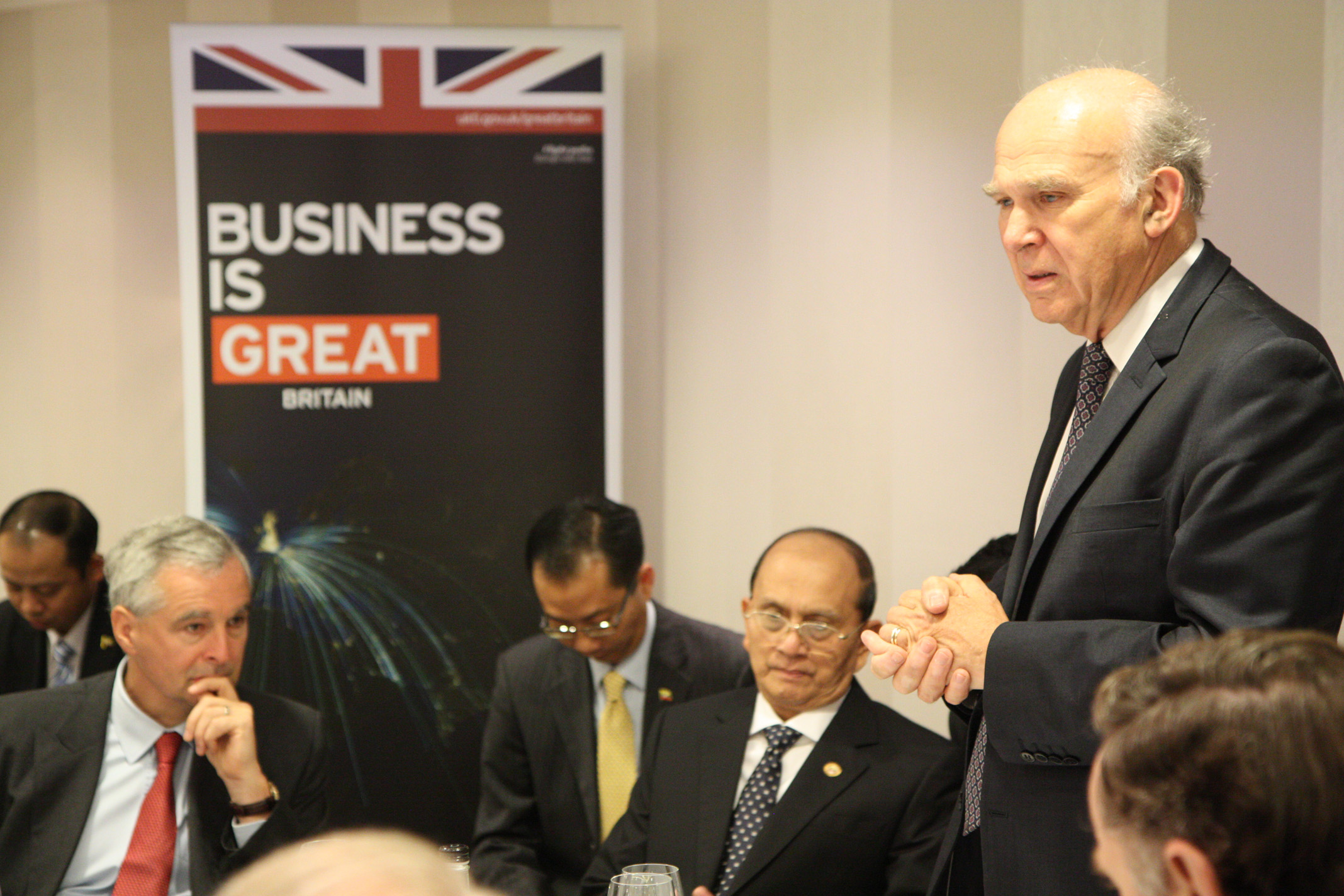
Cable with Myanmar's President Thein Sein in London, July 2013

In office and in his writings he has consistently defended an open trading system and the liberalisation of trade globally, regionally (in the EU Single Market) and bilaterally. Working with Ken Clarke, he supported the proposed Transatlantic Trade and Investment Partnership trade agreement (TTIP), saying in 2014 that "if you are a true believer in free trade then you want to trade more with the US." To critics such as trade unions he replied that he was "genuinely baffled" about their fears that TTIP would lead to the privatisation of the NHS, adding that TTIP had "nothing to do with allowing the Americans to interfere with our NHS". In 2018, concerning the possibility of US-UK trade deal which might follow the United Kingdom's future exit from the European Union, Cable warned that a trade deal in such circumstances might involve agreeing to open up the NHS to private American healthcare firms. Cable claimed this was unlike TTIP in which public services were to remain protected and therefore he argued the UK should remain in the EU. Cable also warned that a post-Brexit trade deal with the US might lead to accepting lower standards in farming produce, less food being produced in the UK and less employment for farmers.

Cable thinks free trade is not a zero-sum game and that it is mutually beneficial for nations, stating: "Countries are better off when they participate in specialisation, with consumers benefiting from greater choice, higher quality products, and lower prices." He has condemned British and American politicians such as Donald Trump who he claims exploit the "anger and fear" over potential job losses which may result from foreign trade competition.

=== Human rights ===
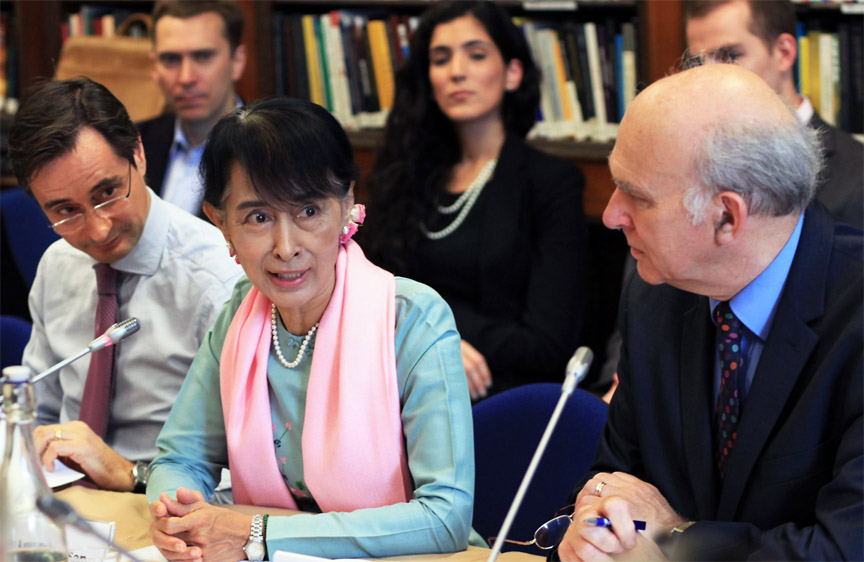
Cable with Chatham House's Director Robin Niblett (left) and Myanmar's human rights activist Aung San Suu Kyi

In May 2018, Theresa May welcomed Turkish President Recep Tayyip Erdoğan to the United Kingdom for a three-day state visit. Erdoğan declared that the United Kingdom is "an ally and a strategic partner, but also a real friend." Cable denounced the visit, saying that "The UK has a strong, proud history of democracy and human rights, but our reputation on the world stage is in danger of being eroded by this Conservative government’s desire to woo world leaders like [Donald] Trump and Erdoğan. May’s administration appears to have substituted diplomacy for sycophancy in its pursuit of Brexit." Cable said that Erdoğan "is responsible for alarming oppression and violence."

In response to the murder of the Saudi opposition journalist Jamal Khashoggi, Cable said: "This situation gets murkier and murkier. The Government should have already suspended arms export licences to Saudi Arabia given the outrages in Yemen. This reinforces the argument for loosening the bonds to the regime."

=== Taxation and economy ===
As an economist, Cable considers Adam Smith and John Maynard Keynes to be his heroes, recommending Smith's The Wealth of Nations and Robert Skidelsky’s Life of John Maynard Keynes to novice economists.

He has been a proponent of greater capital spending, or borrowing to invest, and has made the case for this several times during and after the 2010-2015 coalition government.

Cable has called the demutualisation of building societies "one of the greatest acts of economic vandalism in modern times".

Cable supports the continuation of the Liberal Democrat policy of a hypothecated 1p rise in income tax to pay for improved health and social care, along with proposals for replacing national insurance taxes with a likewise hypothecated new NHS and social care tax . He has also voiced support for a wealth tax to raise £15 billion or the equivalent of “less than one-third of 1pc of household wealth, net of debt” which would be used to address "intergenerational inequality." He is widely credited with introducing the idea of a mansion tax in 2009 based on applying a higher tax on properties worth over £1 million: in effect, a tax of 0.5% of the value. The idea has subsequently become the basis for proposals for rebanding.

Cable has been critical of the National Living Wage (the UK system of minimum wage), arguing in 2015 that smaller businesses would struggle to pay employees higher rates.

He has called for companies Google, Amazon, and Facebook to be broken up, and supports the introduction of a digital services tax on technology companies.

=== New party ===
Cable has held differing views over time on the possibility of a new party emerging which could involve the Liberal Democrats. After the election of Jeremy Corbyn to the Labour leadership in 2015, Cable called on centre-left MPs from Labour and the Liberal Democrats to unite to prevent the Conservatives holding a “monopoly on power.” He made a similar suggestion in the lead up to the 2017 general election, predicting a new party in the event of Labour undergoing electoral collapse. After becoming leader of the Liberal Democrats, however, he rejected a proposal for a new anti-Brexit party by former government adviser James Chapman, insisting that anti-Brexit figures should join the Liberal Democrats instead.

=== Coalitions and electoral pacts ===
Cable has taken a sceptical approach to the question of potential coalitions with other parties since 2015. In April 2018, he said that the Liberal Democrats would never form a coalition government with Labour led by Jeremy Corbyn, and previously opposed the idea in 2015 as well where he said working with Labour was "inconceivable" because of Jeremy Corbyn's economic policies. Cable claims he would not work with the Conservatives either, comparing a coalition with the Conservatives to "mating with a praying mantis" where "You get eaten at the end of it." Rather than a coalition or propping up a government, he would prefer to work on "issue-by-issue" instead.

Cable ruled out the idea of electoral pacts in mid-April during the 2017 general election campaign. However, in early May, Cable was recorded suggesting that Liberal Democrat supporters vote for Labour candidates in certain seats where they could stop the Conservatives. Responding to the story on LBC radio, Cable restated that he would not work with Labour and said that the Liberal Democrats had more "common ground" with the Conservatives under David Cameron than with Labour under Jeremy Corbyn. Shortly after, Cable was due to appear and speak at a Compass event in support of a 'progressive alliance' (a proposed electoral pact between the Green Party, the Liberal Democrats, and Labour) but backed out, stating it was "too late" for a progressive alliance because he couldn't work with Labour "in its current form." He had previously spoken at a progressive alliance event by Compass in 2016.

=== Brexit ===
In 2017, a year after the Brexit referendum, Cable believed Brexit might still never happen. He maintained that when people saw the economic costs they would turn against it and a cross-party coalition of opponents to Brexit might develop. Cable said, "the whole question of continued membership will once again arise" if people's living standards worsened and unemployment rose.

Cable called for cross-border digital services and a single EU market for Netflix.

On 23 June 2018 Cable appeared at the People's Vote march in London to mark the second anniversary of the referendum to leave the European Union.In his speech he said, "keep fighting, keep hoping, we will win."

Cable maintained it "beggars belief that the army and the police are now being asked to prepare for riots in the chaotic aftermath of a botched Brexit. (...) For the 'true believers' - the fundamentalists - the costs of Brexit have always been irrelevant. Years of economic pain justified by the erotic spasm of leaving the European Union. Economic pain felt - of course - not by them by those least able to afford it. (...) [Theresa May] is dutifully delivering a policy she doesn't really believe in; failing in negotiations; losing public support; and all to appease a dwindling group of angry people in her party who will denounce her as a traitor, whatever she comes up with. (...) Our sympathy can only extend so far, while she puts the interests of the country second to the whims of the extremists in her party."

=== Tuition fees ===
In 2017, Cable defended the £9,000 per year university tuition fees cap, claiming it would be "dangerous and stupid" and a "cheap populist gesture" to abolish tuition fees, adding that the "40% of students" who go to university should not be subsidised by the "60% who don't". The comments were criticised on social media by figures on the left, while Conservative MP Jo Johnson voiced support for Cable's stance.

=== Housing ===
On housing, he has backed building on green belts as a solution to the housing crisis. He proposes allowing councils to levy up to a 500% council tax on empty homes.

=== The House of Lords ===
In 2018, Cable wrote that he had opposed and still opposed the House of Lords, the upper house of the British Parliament, for being made up of unaccountable members. However, he expressed his appreciation for the Lords' "capacity to defeat and embarrass the government" over Brexit legislation, in which he argued the House of Lords were exercising more thorough oversight. Cable declined an offer to be seated in the House of Lords following the 2015 general election.

== Personal life ==
Cable's first wife was Olympia Rebelo, a Kenyan from a Goan Roman Catholic background, whom he met "in the unromantic setting of a York mental hospital where we happened to be working as nurses during a summer holiday." They had three children together and she completed her PhD in history at Glasgow University in 1976. Olympia was diagnosed with breast cancer shortly after the 1987 general election. After apparently successful treatment, the disease returned in the mid-1990s and before the 1997 general election. She died shortly after the 2001 general election.

In 2004, he married Rachel Wenban Smith. When appearing on BBC Radio 4's Desert Island Discs programme in January 2009, Cable revealed that he wears the wedding rings from both of his marriages.

A keen ballroom dancer, Cable long expressed his desire to appear on the BBC's hit television show Strictly Come Dancing; he appeared on the Christmas 2010 edition of the show, partnered by Erin Boag and dancing the Foxtrot. He performed well and scored 36/40 from the judges, including a mark of 10/10 from head judge Len Goodman. Cable was the second politician to appear on the show, after former Conservative MP Ann Widdecombe.

Cable is Patron of the homelessness charity SPEAR; Twickenham charities catering for mental illness amongst young people (Off the Record) and adults (Lunch at One); carers charities Crossroads Care and Homelink; music therapy for those with learning difficulties (OKMT); and cancer patient support, the Mulberry Centre.

Cable's eldest grandson is social activist and entrepreneur Ayrton Cable.

== Honours ==
- He was sworn in as a member of Her Majesty's Most Honourable Privy Council in 2010 upon his appointment as Secretary of State for Business, Energy and Industrial Strategy and President of the Board of Trade in the coalition government. This gave him the Honorific Title "The Right Honourable" for life.
- In David Cameron’s 2015 Dissolution Honours, Cable was appointed a Knight Bachelor for political and public service.
- Made a freeman of the City of London on January 15, 2025.

== Bibliography ==
- Eclipsing the West: China, India and the Forging of a New World (Manchester University Press, 2025, ISBN 978-1526179821). Shortlisted for the Westminster Book Awards and named one of the Financial Times Best Books of 2025 in Economics.
- Partnership and Politics in a Divided Decade (with Rachel Smith; published by The Real Press, 2022 ISBN 9781912119257
- How to be a Politician (Penguin/Random House, Ebury Press, 2022, ISBN 9781529149654
- The Chinese Conundrum (Alma Books, 2021) ISBN 9781846884689
- Money and Power: The World Leaders Who Changed Economics (Atlantic Books, 2021) ISBN 9781786495105
- Open Arms (Corvus, 2017) ISBN 9781786491718
- After the Storm: The World Economy and Britain's Economic Future (Atlantic Books, 2016) ISBN 9781782394495
- Free Radical: A Memoir (Atlantic Books, 2009) ISBN 9781848870468
- The Storm: The World Economic Crisis and What it Means (Atlantic Books, 2009) ISBN 1-84887-057-4
- The Orange Book: Reclaiming Liberalism edited by David Laws and Paul Marshall; contributions by Vincent Cable and others (Profile Books, 2004) ISBN 1-86197-797-2
- Regulating Modern Capitalism (Centre for Reform Papers) (Centre for Reform, 2002) ISBN 1-902622-36-7
- Commerce (Liberal Democrat Consultation Papers) (Liberal Democrat Publications, 2002) ISBN 1-85187-688-X
- Globalization: Rules and Standards for the World Economy (Chatham House Papers) Vincent Cable, Albert Bressand (Thomson Learning, 2000) ISBN 1-85567-350-9
- Globalisation & Global Governance (Thomson Learning, 1999) ISBN 0-8264-6169-7
- Preparing for EMU: A Liberal Democrat Response (Centre for Reform Papers) (Centre for Reform, 1999) ISBN 1-902622-06-5
- China and India: Economic Reform and Global Integration (Royal Institute of International Affairs, 1995) ISBN 1-899658-00-9
- Global Superhighways: The Future of International Telecommunications Policy (International Economics Programme Special Paper) Vincent Cable, Catherine Distler (Royal Institute of International Affairs, 1995) ISBN 0-905031-97-0
- The World's New Fissures: Identities in Crisis (Demos, 1994) ISBN 1-898309-35-3
- Trade Blocs: The Future of Regional Integration edited by Vincent Cable and David Henderson (The Brookings Institution, 1994) ISBN 0-905031-81-4
- Commerce of Culture: Experience of Indian Handicrafts (Lancer International, 1990) ISBN 81-7062-004-X
- Developing with Foreign Investment edited by Vincent Cable and Bishnodat Persaud (Routledge, 1987) ISBN 0-7099-4825-5
- Economics and the Politics of Protection: Some Case Studies of Industries (World Bank Staff Working Papers Number 569) (World Bank, 1984) ISBN 0-8213-0199-3
- World Textile Trade and Production Trends Vincent Cable, Betsy Baker (Economist Intelligence Unit, 1983) ISBN 0-86218-084-8
- Case Studies in Development Economics (Heinemann Educ., 1982) ISBN 0-435-33937-0
- The Role of Handicrafts Exports: Problems and Prospects Based on Indian Experience (ODI Working Paper) (Overseas Development Institute, 1982) ISBN 0-85003-086-2
- British Electronics and Competition with Newly Industrialising Countries Vincent Cable, Jeremy Clarke (Overseas Development Institute, 1981) ISBN 0-85003-076-5
- Evaluation of the Multifibre Arrangement and Negotiating Options (Commonwealth Secretariat, 1981) ISBN 0-85092-204-6
- British Interests and Third World Development (Overseas Development Institute, 1980) ISBN 0-85003-070-6
- Britain's Pattern of Specialization in Manufactured Goods With Developing Countries and Trade Protection (World Bank Staff Working Paper No 425/8 Oct) Vincent Cable, Ivonia Rebelo (World Bank, 1980) ISBN 0-686-36204-7
- World Textile Trade and Production (Economist Intelligence Unit, 1979) ISBN 0-900351-85-3
- South Asia's Exports to the EEC: Obstacles and Opportunities Vincent Cable, Ann Weston (Overseas Development Institute, 1979) ISBN 0-85003-068-4
- World Textile Trade and Production (Economist Intelligence Unit, 1979) ISBN B0000EGG8M
- Import Controls: The Case Against (Fabian Society, 1977) ISBN 0-7163-1335-9
- Glasgow: Area of Need. Essay in 'The Red Paper on Scotland' ed. Gordon Brown. Edinburgh 1975. ISBN 0-9501890-7-3
- Glasgow's Motorways: a Technocratic Blight (New Society, 2 September. 1974)
- Whither Kenyan Emigrants? (Fabian Society, 1969) ISBN 0-7163-2018-5

== See also ==
- Liberal Democrat Frontbench Team
- Opposition to Brexit

Parliament of the United Kingdom
Preceded by Toby Jessel	Member of Parliament for Twickenham; 1997–2015	Succeeded by Tania Mathias
Preceded by Tania Mathias	Member of Parliament for Twickenham; 2017–2019	Succeeded by Munira Wilson
Party political offices
Preceded by Matthew Taylor	Liberal Democrat Treasury spokesperson 2003–2010	Succeeded by Danny Alexander
Preceded by Menzies Campbell	Deputy Leader of the Liberal Democrats; 2006–2010	Succeeded by Simon Hughes
Preceded by Tim Farron	Leader of the Liberal Democrats; 2017–2019	Succeeded by Jo Swinson
Political offices
Preceded by Peter Mandelson	Secretary of State for Business, Innovation and Skills; 2010–2015	Succeeded by Sajid Javid
Preceded by Peter Mandelson	President of the Board of Trade; 2010–2015	Succeeded by Sajid Javid
