= Ayrton Cable =

Slovak social activist

- Born: 10 January 2003 (age 23); Nové Zámky, Slovakia
- Known for: Animal and human rights activism
- Relatives: Vince Cable (grandfather)

Ayrton Cable (born 10 January 2003) is a social activist, known for his activism on issues surrounding food and water security.

In 2012 he screened a film about food labelling and animal welfare to an invited audience in the Palace of Westminster. The film, entitled How was this Animal Kept?, was professionally produced at Hampton Court House School with the help of Mexican film director Alejandro Sesma and the EU labelling project manager at the Farm Animal Welfare Forum, Ffinlo Costain.

In June 2014 Cable founded the Humanitarian Water and Food Youth Award, (WAFA Youth) raising awareness of issues relating to poverty and in particular food and water security. He has spoken and appeared on television, radio, at awards ceremonies, and at TEDx.

== Early campaigns and activism ==
Cable launched the Labelling Matters campaign, organised by Compassion in World Farming, RSPCA, Soil Association and WSPA, which calls for a new law to be introduced in the UK, labelling meat and dairy food more clearly to show how the animals which were used to produce the food had been kept.

Cable's campaign film, made in partnership with Compassion in World Farming, The Royal Society for the Prevention of Cruelty to Animals, World Animal Protection and The Soil Association was titled How was this animal kept? and was premiered in September 2012 at the UK Parliament to MPs and the media. Since its launch, the film has been shown in schools nationwide, and used to teach children about ethical food and farming in the Geography and Citizenship curriculum. After its screening in Parliament, Cable discussed his film in media; he also met with David Heath, the UK Minister for Agriculture.

In 2013, Cable supported Bandi Mbubi's campaign for fair trade mobile phones, Congo Calling, Cable came Runner Up in Amnesty International's 'Young Photojournalist of the Year Award', contributing a photo showing his mother using a mobile phone and the text 'Blood Phones: Demand A Fair Trade Mobile Phone'.

Cable is a youth ambassador for the anti-poverty charity Tearfund. In May 2013, he travelled to Malawi on behalf of Tearfund and ITV as part of the IF campaign. Whilst there, he met Mapangano, a young boy his own age who suffers from malnutrition. He documented his experiences in Malawi both on ITV and BBC Radio, raising awareness for the IF campaign and urging world leaders to tackle the problem of global hunger.

== Humanitarian Water and Food Youth Award ==
As a result of his activism, Cable was invited to create a Youth component for the Humanitarian Water and Food Awards, using gamification as a way to encourage young people to take an interest in social activism. Founded in 2008 and based in Copenhagen, The Humanitarian Water and Food Awards promote global best practices in water and food security initiatives. At the 2014 WAFA Awards, held in London on 19 June, Cable launched the Humanitarian Water and Food Youth Award (WAFA Youth). The WAFA Youth Award has its roots in Mahatma Gandhi’s dictum, "Be the change you want to see in the world". Its goal is to empower young people to be a key part of solving food and water security.

Cable has contributed to The Huffington Post and an early version of his film introducing the awards, The World Food Challenge, was shown as part of the International School Meals Day Initiative in front of the World Bank and USAID and was aired during We Day UK, 2013 at Wembley Arena in front of other social activists who spoke on the day including Malala Yousafzai, Al Gore, Richard Branson, and over 10,000 young people.

In launching the award, Cable invited young people to participate in activities, lessons and projects to find solutions to feeding everyone in the world and providing safe water. In line with the WAFA Award's approach - based on the view that we already have the resources to sustainably feed our world, but that we need access and the tools to use these resources sustainably - he and the staff of WAFA Youth, in collaboration with the 'Water Explorer' programme created by Global Action Plan, set up WAFA Youth as an online platform for schools. Across 2015 - 2017, at least 100,000 children participated in the programme from 1,400 schools in more twelve countries. The country teams with the best record of highlighting the I - CARE values (Integrity, Commitment, Awareness, Responsibility, Empathy) were entered for the WAFA Youth International Awards. The winners of 2015 were from Wyebank Secondary School, Durban, South Africa and in 2016, the winners were the Water Masters from Convent of Mercy School in Cork, Ireland.

== Continuing activism ==
On 26 June 2014, Cable gave a TED talk as part of TEDxYouth at Hampton Court House School. His talk, titled ‘“What’s missing from our efforts to change the world?” described his previous campaigning and activism. He went on to raise awareness for the success of FairPhone, the Permaculture Research Institute, and the Green Belt movement to ask questions regarding how we can change our world. He introduced the CARE Revolution. This initiative was fostered and developed by The100Hours, a charitable organisation based in the UK whose aim is to bring 'wise and compassionate living and leadership' into the centre of education; Cable is also a spokesperson and ambassador for The100Hours and in November 2014 was named an #iwill Ambassador for youth social action. In January 2015, along with his parents, educators Paul Vincent Cable and Agnesa Tothova, Cable co-founded a chain of 'changemaker' schools known as EnSo, aimed at children at the bottom of the economic pyramid in Sub-Saharan Africa and India. These schools have adopted in their curriculum a version of the methodology Cable has used in his social activism and social entrepreneurship.

From 2016 to 2019, Cable worked with the Diana Award and Royal Foundation’s Cyberbullying Taskforce. From March 2017 to March 2019 Cable served on the Youth Board of SuperCell, a Finnish mobile game development company, focusing on tackling cyberbullying.

Ayrton Cable is the grandson of former UK Secretary of State for Business, Innovation, and Skills and Liberal Democrat leader Vince Cable.

== Awards and honours ==
- Jubilee Award and named as an #iwill Ambassador
- Vitabiotics Wellkid and Wellteen Featured Social Action Case Study
