= Teddington (ward) =

- Electoral ward for the Richmond upon Thames London Borough Council
- Teddington ward boundaries since 2022
- Borough: Richmond upon Thames
- County: Greater London
- Population: 10,562 (2021) (Note: 2021 Census data reported for 2022 ward boundaries)
- Electorate: 7,927 (2022)
- Area: 4.272 square kilometres (1.649 sq mi)

Current electoral ward
- Created: 1965
- Number of members: 3
- Councillors: Charlie Engel; Phil Giesler; Richard Baker
- GSS code: E05013788

Teddington is an electoral ward in the London Borough of Richmond upon Thames. The ward has existed since the creation of the borough of 1 April 1965 was first used in the 1964 elections. It returns councillors to Richmond upon Thames London Borough Council.

== Richmond upon Thames council elections since 2022 ==
There was a revision of ward boundaries in Richmond upon Thames in 2022.

=== 2024 by-election ===
The by-election was held on 18 January 2024, following the death of Martin Elengorn.

2024 Teddington by-election
| Party | Candidate | Votes | % | ±% |
|---|---|---|---|---|
| Liberal Democrats | Richard Baker | 1,716 | 64.3 | ▲2.7 |
| Conservative | Elizabeth Foster | 561 | 21.0 | ▼0.8 |
| Green | Chantal Kerr-Shepherd | 184 | 6.9 | New |
| Labour | James Thomson | 163 | 6.1 | ▼5.4 |
| Independent | Dominic Stockford | 46 | 1.7 | New |
| Majority | | 1,155 | 43.3 | −1.9 |
| Turnout | | 2,670 | 33.8 | −15.5 |
| Liberal Democrats hold | | Swing | -0.9 | |

=== 2022 election ===
The election took place on 5 May 2022.

2022 Richmond upon Thames London Borough Council election: Teddington
| Party | Candidate | Votes | % | ±% |
|---|---|---|---|---|
| Liberal Democrats | Charlie Engel | 2,592 | 67.2 | |
| Liberal Democrats | Martin Elengorn | 2,587 | 67.0 | |
| Liberal Democrats | Phil Giesler | 2,502 | 64.8 | |
| Conservative | Janet Pell | 840 | 21.8 | |
| Conservative | Philip Eastment | 824 | 21.4 | |
| Conservative | Brian Jarvis | 798 | 20.7 | |
| Labour | Elizabeth Mackenzie | 445 | 11.5 | |
| Labour | Neil Browning | 429 | 11.1 | |
| Labour | Sampson Low | 353 | 9.1 | |
| Turnout | | 3,859 | 49.3 | |
| Liberal Democrats win (new boundaries) | | | | |
| Liberal Democrats win (new boundaries) | | | | |
| Liberal Democrats win (new boundaries) | | | | |

== 2002–2022 Richmond upon Thames council elections ==
Teddington ward boundaries from 2002 to 2022

There was a revision of ward boundaries in Richmond upon Thames in 2002.

=== 2018 election ===
The election took place on 3 May 2018.

2018 Richmond upon Thames London Borough Council election: Teddington
| Party | Candidate | Votes | % | ±% |
|---|---|---|---|---|
| Liberal Democrats | Richard Baker | 2,571 | 59.9 | ▲17.9 |
| Liberal Democrats | Martin Elengorn | 2,491 | 58.1 | ▲18.0 |
| Liberal Democrats | Tim Woodcock | 2,432 | 56.6 | ▲17.0 |
| Conservative | Elizabeth Foster | 1,379 | 32.1 | ▼6.2 |
| Conservative | Simon Lamb | 1,303 | 30.4 | ▼3.9 |
| Conservative | Richard Fitter | 1,280 | 29.8 | ▼6.1 |
| Labour | Penny Banaji | 361 | 8.4 | ▼2.8 |
| Labour | Neil Browning | 339 | 7.9 | ▼3.1 |
| Labour | Louise Creighton | 314 | 7.3 | ▼2.9 |
| Turnout | | 4,297 | 53.2 | ▲5.4 |
| Liberal Democrats hold | | Swing | | |
| Liberal Democrats hold | | Swing | | |
| Liberal Democrats hold | | Swing | | |

=== 2014 election ===
The election took place on 22 May 2014.

2014 Richmond upon Thames London Borough Council election: Teddington
| Party | Candidate | Votes | % | ±% |
|---|---|---|---|---|
| Liberal Democrats | Jennifer Churchill | 1,587 | 42.0 | ▼5.7 |
| Liberal Democrats | Martin Elengorn | 1,514 | 40.1 | ▼5.6 |
| Liberal Democrats | Stephen Knight | 1,497 | 39.6 | ▼5.6 |
| Conservative | Elizabeth Foster | 1,447 | 38.3 | ▲0.9 |
| Conservative | Jon Hollis | 1,356 | 35.9 | ▼1.3 |
| Conservative | Simon Lamb | 1,296 | 34.3 | ▼4.9 |
| Green | Mark Sanders-Barwick | 512 | 13.6 | New |
| Labour | Cheryl Ould | 425 | 11.3 | ▲0.7 |
| Labour | Michelle Sims | 414 | 11.0 | ▲0.8 |
| Labour | Eva Tutchell | 385 | 10.2 | ▲1.9 |
| UKIP | Dominic Stockford | 308 | 8.2 | New |
| Turnout | | 3,780 | 47.8 | ▼27.7 |
| Liberal Democrats hold | | Swing | | |
| Liberal Democrats hold | | Swing | | |
| Liberal Democrats hold | | Swing | | |

=== 2010 election ===
The election on 6 May 2010 took place on the same day as the United Kingdom general election.

Teddington
| Party | Candidate | Votes | % | ±% |
|---|---|---|---|---|
| Liberal Democrats | Jennifer Churchill | 2,800 | 47.7 | ▼9.6 |
| Liberal Democrats | Martin David Elengorn | 2,679 | 45.6 | ▼12.9 |
| Liberal Democrats | Stephen John Knight | 2,655 | 45.2 | ▼11.8 |
| Conservative | Simon Lamb | 2,298 | 39.2 | ▲7.0 |
| Conservative | Graeme Tallantire | 2,195 | 37.4 | ▲5.7 |
| Conservative | Barry Edwards | 2,183 | 37.2 | ▲8.0 |
| Labour | Margaret Mary Theresa Mills | 619 | 10.6 | ▲5.5 |
| Labour | Michelle Sims | 554 | 9.4 | ▲4.1 |
| Labour | Gerard Elliott Ward | 488 | 8.3 | New |
| Turnout | | 5,870 | 75.5 | ▲24.4 |
| Liberal Democrats hold | | Swing | | |
| Liberal Democrats hold | | Swing | | |
| Liberal Democrats hold | | Swing | | |

=== 2006 election ===
The election took place on 4 May 2006.

Teddington
| Party | Candidate | Votes | % | ±% |
|---|---|---|---|---|
| Liberal Democrats | Martin David Elengorn | 2,088 | 58.5 | |
| Liberal Democrats | Stephen John Knight | 2,046 | 57.3 | |
| Liberal Democrats | James Philip Jardim Spencer Mumford | 2,036 | 57.0 | |
| Conservative | Karen Anne Bradley | 1,150 | 32.2 | |
| Conservative | Roger Brian Avins | 1,132 | 31.7 | |
| Conservative | John Christopher Wyllie | 1,041 | 29.2 | |
| Green | Kevin John McMahon | 438 | 12.3 | |
| Labour | Kevin Anthony Gilligan | 188 | 5.3 | |
| Labour | Margaret Mary Theresa Mills | 182 | 5.1 | |
| Turnout | | 3,569 | 51.1 | |
| Liberal Democrats hold | | Swing | | |
| Liberal Democrats hold | | Swing | | |
| Liberal Democrats hold | | Swing | | |

=== 2002 election ===
The election took place on 2 May 2002.
