= Hampton North =

Electoral ward in London, England

- Electoral ward for the Richmond upon Thames London Borough Council
- Hampton North ward boundaries since 2022
- Borough: Richmond upon Thames
- County: Greater London
- Population: 9,716 (2021) (Note: 2021 Census data reported for 2022 ward boundaries)
- Electorate: 7,338 (2022)
- Area: 1.951 square kilometres (0.753 sq mi)

Current electoral ward
- Created: 2002
- Number of members: 3
- Councillors: Elizabeth Gant; Jeremy Davis; Carey Bishop
- GSS code: E05000521 (2002–2022); E05013779 (2022–present)

Hampton North is an electoral ward in the London Borough of Richmond upon Thames. The ward was first used in the 2002 elections. It returns councillors to Richmond upon Thames London Borough Council.

== Richmond upon Thames council elections since 2022 ==
There was a revision of ward boundaries in Richmond upon Thames in 2022.

=== 2026 election ===
The election took place on 7 May 2026.

2026 Richmond upon Thames London Borough Council election: Hampton North
Party	Candidate	Votes	%	±%
Liberal Democrats	Carey Bishop	1,767	53.4	N/A
Liberal Democrats	Elizabeth Gant	1,694	51.2	+1.6
Liberal Democrats	Jeremy Davis	1,625	49.1	+2.3
Reform	Martin Fraiel	565	17.1	N/A
Reform	Max Hoskinson	548	16.6	N/A
Conservative	Cathy Howe	535	16.2	−19.1
Conservative	Alan Butler	495	15.0	−18.5
Reform	John Yianni	486	14.7	N/A
Conservative	Nupur Majumdar	463	14.0	−15.5
Green	Poppy Robbins	431	13.0	−18.3
Green	Stephen Hancock	359	10.9	N/A
Green	Ayesha Sadiq	343	10.4	N/A
Labour	Lucy Abercrombie	174	5.3	−7.1
Labour	Christopher Johnson	109	3.3	−6.8
Labour	Philip Moshi	98	3.0	−6.4
Turnout		3,308	44.99	−0.5
Registered electors		7,352		
Liberal Democrats hold		Swing		
Liberal Democrats hold		Swing		
Liberal Democrats hold		Swing		

=== 2024 by-election ===
The by-election was held on 18 January 2024, following the death of Geoffrey Samuel.

2024 Hampton North by-election
Party	Candidate	Votes	%	±%
Liberal Democrats	Carey Bishop	1,177	53.2	▲6.4
Conservative	Nupur Majumdar	771	34.8	▼0.5
Labour	Sam Cullen	159	7.2	▼5.2
Green	Danielle Coleman	106	4.6	▼26.7
Majority		406	18.4	+8.7
Turnout		2,213	30.9	−14.6
Liberal Democrats gain from Conservative		Swing	+4.3	

=== 2022 election ===
The election took place on 5 May 2022.

2022 Richmond upon Thames London Borough Council election: Hampton North
Party	Candidate	Votes	%	±%
Liberal Democrats	Elizabeth Gant	1,654	49.6	
Liberal Democrats	Jeremy Davis	1,560	46.8	
Conservative	Geoffrey Samuel	1,175	35.3	
Conservative	Kate Howard	1,117	33.5	
Green	Kallon Basham	1,044	31.3	
Conservative	Nupur Majumdar	983	29.5	
Independent	Avril Coehlo	678	20.3	
Labour	Louisa Spawls	412	12.4	
Labour	Elliot Mitchell	337	10.1	
Labour	James Johnson	314	9.4	
Turnout		3,333	45.5	
Liberal Democrats win (new boundaries)				
Liberal Democrats win (new boundaries)				
Conservative win (new boundaries)				

== 2002–2022 Richmond upon Thames council elections ==
Hampton North ward boundaries from 2002 to 2022

=== 2018 election ===
The election took place on 3 May 2018.

2018 Richmond upon Thames London Borough Council election: Hampton North
Party	Candidate	Votes	%	±%
Liberal Democrats	Avril Coelho	1,373	42.89	+20.83
Conservative	Geoffrey Samuel	1,372	42.86	−1.83
Conservative	Kate Howard	1,337	41.77	−0.45
Conservative	Martin Seymour	1,326	41.42	+0.26
Liberal Democrats	Jerry Elloy	1,237	38.64	+14.33
Liberal Democrats	York Membery	1,125	35.15	+12.64
Labour	Cathy Driscoll	467	14.59	+2.40
Labour	Harpreet Gill	429	13.40	+1.44
Labour	Philip Moshi	356	11.12	+0.38
UKIP	Paul Rodwell	107	3.34	−9.39
Turnout		3,206	44.35	
Liberal Democrats gain from Conservative		Swing		
Conservative hold		Swing		
Conservative hold		Swing		

=== 2014 election ===
The election took place on 22 May 2014.

2014 Richmond upon Thames London Borough Council election: Hampton North
Party	Candidate	Votes	%	±%
Conservative	Geoffrey Samuel	1,390	44.69	
Conservative	Kate Howard	1,313	42.22	
Conservative	Martin Seymour	1,280	41.16	
Liberal Democrats	Ellen Day	756	24.31	
Liberal Democrats	Darren Thornton	700	22.51	
Liberal Democrats	Avril Coelho	686	22.06	
UKIP	Michael Mackie	416	13.38	
UKIP	Michael Maloney	397	12.77	
UKIP	Paul Rodwell	396	12.73	
Labour	Louisa Spawls	379	12.19	
Labour	Jane Butters	372	11.96	
Green	Catherine von Ruhland	342	11.00	
Labour	John Thrower	334	10.74	
Turnout				
Conservative gain from Liberal Democrats		Swing		
Conservative hold		Swing		
Conservative gain from Liberal Democrats		Swing		

=== 2010 election ===
The election on 6 May 2010 took place on the same day as the United Kingdom general election.

2010 Richmond upon Thames London Borough Council election: Hampton North
Party	Candidate	Votes	%	±%
Liberal Democrats	Ellen Day	2,113	43.2%	
Conservative	Geoffrey Samuel	2,016	41.2%	
Liberal Democrats	Darren Thornton	1,980		
Liberal Democrats	Roger Crouch	1973		
Conservative	Martin Seymour	1973		
Conservative	Kate Howard	1960		
Labour	Jane Butters	531	10.9%	
Labour	Pamela Lockley	444		
Labour	Brian Firth	423		
Green	Edmund Gimzewski	233	4.8%	
Turnout		2,113	43.2%	−0.74
Liberal Democrats gain from Conservative		Swing		
Conservative hold		Swing		
Liberal Democrats gain from Conservative		Swing		

=== 2006 election ===
The election took place on 4 May 2006.

2006 Richmond upon Thames London Borough Council election: Hampton North
Party	Candidate	Votes	%	±%
Conservative	Catherine Howard	1,574	52.43	
Conservative	Martin Seymour	1,556	51.83	
Conservative	Geoffrey Samuel	1,493	49.73	
Liberal Democrats	Paul Bensilum	1,319	43.94	
Liberal Democrats	Matthew Wherry	1,236	41.17	
Liberal Democrats	James Cox	1,228	40.91	
Turnout		3,002 (6506)	46.14	
Conservative hold		Swing		
Conservative hold		Swing		
Conservative hold		Swing		

=== 2002 election ===
The election took place on 2 May 2002.
