= 2018 Richmond upon Thames London Borough Council election =

2018 local election in England

2018 Richmond upon Thames London Borough Council Election
- 3 May 2018

All 54 seats to Richmond upon Thames London Borough Council 28 seats needed for a majority
- Turnout: 51.4%
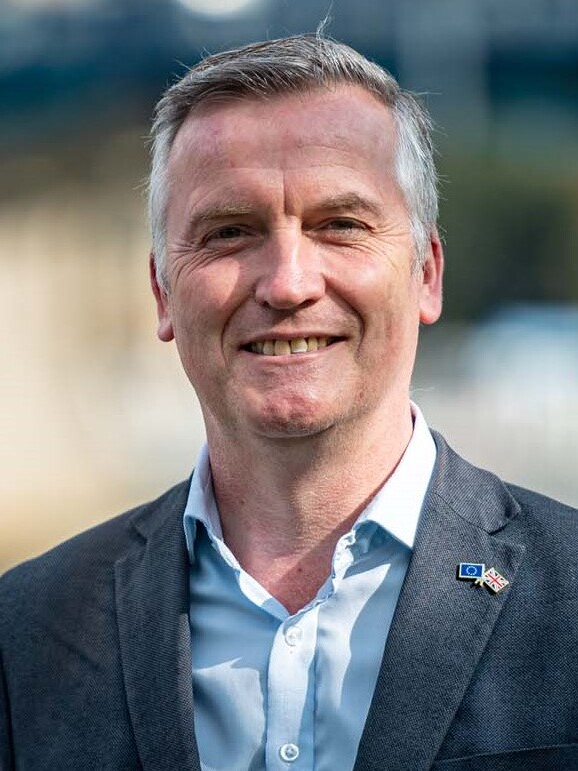
	First party	Second party	Third party
		Con	Grn
Leader	Gareth Roberts	Paul Hodgins	Richard Bennett
Party	Liberal Democrats	Conservative	Green
Leader's seat	Hampton	Barnes	South Twickenham
Last election	15 seats, 31.8%	39 seats, 45.0%	0 seats, 6.0%
Seats won	39	11	4
Seat change	▲24	▼28	▲4
Popular vote	146,198	78,431	9,392
Percentage	46.7%	37.6%	4.5%
Swing	▲14.9%	▼7.3%	▼1.5%
- Map of the results of the 2018 Richmond upon Thames Borough council election. Liberal Democrats in yellow, Conservatives in blue, Green Party in green.
Council control before election
Conservative
Council control after election
Liberal Democrats

The 2018 Richmond upon Thames London Borough Council Election took place on 3 May 2018 to elect members of Richmond upon Thames London Borough Council in England, on the same day as other local elections. The previous time the seats were up for election was 22 May 2014.

The Liberal Democrats regained control of the council, winning 39 out of the 54 seats, with the Conservative Party forming the principal opposition with eleven of the remaining fifteen seats.

== Results ==
Richmond Upon Thames Borough Council Composition 2018

Richmond upon Thames Council election result 2018
Party	Seats	Gains	Losses	Net gain/loss	Seats %	Votes %	Votes	+/−
Liberal Democrats	39	+24	0	+24	72.2	46.7	97,496	+14.9
Conservative	11	0	-28	-28	20.4	37.6	78,431	-7.4
Labour	0	0	0	0	0.0	10.4	21,723	-2.1
Green	4	+4	0	+4	7.4	4.5	9,392	-1.5
Women's Equality	0	0	0	0	0.0	0.4	741	New
Independent	0	0	0	0	0.0	0.3	547	-0.6
UKIP	0	0	0	0	0.0	0.2	452	-3.7
Socialist (GB)	0	0	0	0	0.0	0.2	452	New

== Ward results ==
=== Barnes ===
Barnes
Party	Candidate	Votes	%	±%
Conservative	Aphra Brandreth	2,017	54.26	−3.73
Conservative	Paul Hodgins*	1,919	51.63	−6.49
Conservative	Rita Palmer*	1,895	50.98	−7.39
Liberal Democrats	Merlene Emerson	1,539	41.40	+20.79
Liberal Democrats	Anne McKee	1,486	39.98	+20.53
Green	Nicola Albon	1,058	28.46	+13.21
Labour	Judith Enright	234	6.30	−6.50
Labour	Sachin Patel	185	4.98	−6.78
Labour	Alec Lever	153	4.12	−5.81
Socialist (GB)	Adam Buick	28	0.75	N/A
Turnout		3,725	50.15	
Conservative hold		Swing		
Conservative hold		Swing		
Conservative hold		Swing		

=== East Sheen ===
East Sheen
Party	Candidate	Votes	%	±%
Conservative	Brian Marcel*	2,026	48.25	−10.45
Liberal Democrats	Mona Adams	1,982	47.20	+25.41
Conservative	Seamus Joyce	1,979	47.13	−12.43
Conservative	Robert Thompson*	1,928	45.92	−9.11
Liberal Democrats	Julia Cambridge	1,927	45.89	+25.89
Liberal Democrats	James Heath	1,724	41.06	+24.89
Labour	Deborah Genders	276	6.57	−4.74
Labour	Giles Oakley	244	5.81	−5.33
Labour	Rowan Woodward	176	4.19	−6.65
Turnout		4,204	55.24	
Conservative hold		Swing		
Liberal Democrats gain from Conservative		Swing		
Conservative hold		Swing		

=== Fulwell & Hampton Hill ===
Fulwell & Hampton Hill
Party	Candidate	Votes	%	±%
Liberal Democrats	Jonathan Cardy*	2,497	62.50	+23.66
Liberal Democrats	Matthew Hull	2,368	59.27	+21.77
Green	Monica Saunders	1,923	48.14	+31.91
Conservative	Mark Boyle*	1,267	31.71	−5.14
Conservative	Joe Broughton	1,194	29.89	−4.36
Conservative	Saba Shaukat	1,002	25.08	−7.65
Labour	Catherine Pickering	405	10.14	−2.70
Labour	Jane Butters	363	9.09	−2.11
Labour	Adam Gladstone	272	6.81	−3.89
Turnout		4,002	50.61	
Liberal Democrats hold		Swing		
Liberal Democrats hold		Swing		
Green gain from Conservative		Swing		

=== Ham, Petersham & Richmond Riverside ===
Ham, Petersham & Richmond Riverside
Party	Candidate	Votes	%	±%
Liberal Democrats	Penny Frost*	2,344	58.79	+21.53
Liberal Democrats	Gareth Richards	2,038	51.12	+15.03
Green	Andrée Frieze	1,917	48.08	+36.41
Conservative	Jean Loveland*	1,485	37.25	+0.60
Conservative	Sara Gezdari	1,286	32.25	−4.32
Conservative	Radomir Tylecote	1,204	30.20	−3.36
Labour	Jed Baxter	313	7.85	−1.21
Labour	Sandra Keen	306	7.67	−3.47
Labour	Danny Moran	267	6.70	−1.19
Turnout		3,994	53.97	
Liberal Democrats hold		Swing		
Liberal Democrats gain from Conservative		Swing		
Green gain from Conservative		Swing		

=== Hampton ===
Hampton
Party	Candidate	Votes	%	±%
Liberal Democrats	Gareth Roberts*	2,464	58.03	+15.42
Liberal Democrats	Suzette Nicholson*	2,442	57.51	+15.11
Liberal Democrats	Geraint Thomason	2,107	49.62	+16.11
Conservative	Tim Rosser	1,513	35.63	+2.04
Conservative	Petra Sale*	1,511	35.59	−0.52
Conservative	Jon Slinn	1,421	33.47	+2.23
Labour	Bob Bollen	316	7.44	−3.01
Labour	Margaret Mills	258	6.08	−4.56
Labour	Christopher Fawcett	218	5.13	−3.48
Turnout		4,253	53.78	
Liberal Democrats hold		Swing		
Liberal Democrats hold		Swing		
Liberal Democrats gain from Conservative		Swing		

=== Hampton North ===
Hampton North
Party	Candidate	Votes	%	±%
Liberal Democrats	Avril Coelho	1,373	42.89	+20.83
Conservative	Geoffrey Samuel*	1,372	42.86	−1.83
Conservative	Kate Howard*	1,337	41.77	−0.45
Conservative	Martin Seymour*	1,326	41.42	+0.26
Liberal Democrats	Jerry Elloy	1,237	38.64	+14.33
Liberal Democrats	York Membery	1,125	35.15	+12.64
Labour	Cathy Driscoll	467	14.59	+2.40
Labour	Harpreet Gill	429	13.40	+1.44
Labour	Philip Moshi	356	11.12	+0.38
UKIP	Paul Rodwell	107	3.34	−9.39
Turnout		3,206	44.35	
Liberal Democrats gain from Conservative		Swing		
Conservative hold		Swing		
Conservative hold		Swing		

=== Hampton Wick ===
Hampton Wick
Party	Candidate	Votes	%	±%
Liberal Democrats	Robin Brown	2,636	61.75	+41.59
Liberal Democrats	Jim Millard	2,439	57.13	+37.84
Green	Dylan Baxendale	1,738	40.71	+19.96
Conservative	Tony Arbour*	1,642	38.46	−17.29
Conservative	Suzy Webb	1,280	29.98	−20.94
Conservative	Chris Harrison	1,275	29.87	−17.42
Labour	Eva Tutchell	415	9.72	−4.41
Labour	Caroline Loewenstein	307	7.19	−8.37
Labour	Gerard Ward	258	6.04	−9.46
Turnout		4,277	52.22	
Liberal Democrats gain from Conservative		Swing		
Liberal Democrats gain from Conservative		Swing		
Green gain from Conservative		Swing		

=== Heathfield ===
Heathfield
Party	Candidate	Votes	%	±%
Liberal Democrats	John Coombs*	1,763	44.72	+11.30
Liberal Democrats	Lesley Pollesche	1,560	39.57	+9.88
Liberal Democrats	Michael Wilson	1,507	38.23	+10.99
Labour	Sergio Cortes Allsopp	1,093	27.73	+5.53
Labour	Jan Kilsby	1,044	26.48	+5.59
Conservative	Alan Butler*	1,040	26.38	−6.43
Conservative	George Dryja	1,032	26.18	−5.52
Labour	Ranjeev Walia	1,025	26.00	+8.26
Conservative	Buddhi Weerasinghe	947	24.02	−3.17
UKIP	Peter Dul	159	4.03	−15.00
Turnout		3,948	50.31	
Liberal Democrats hold		Swing		
Liberal Democrats gain from Conservative		Swing		
Liberal Democrats gain from Conservative		Swing		

=== Kew ===
Kew
Party	Candidate	Votes	%	±%
Liberal Democrats	J-F Burford	2,503	54.56	+16.88
Liberal Democrats	Lotte Campanale	2,467	53.77	+20.73
Liberal Democrats	Ian Craigie	2,308	50.31	+21.53
Conservative	David Linnette*	1,870	40.76	−5.91
Conservative	Monica Horner*	1,852	40.37	−4.39
Conservative	Roger Metcalfe	1,713	37.34	−12.11
Labour	Barnaby Marder	252	5.49	−2.70
Labour	Duska Rosenberg	238	5.19	−2.76
Labour	René Smit	202	4.40	−3.53
Turnout		4,594	53.75	
Liberal Democrats gain from Conservative		Swing		
Liberal Democrats gain from Conservative		Swing		
Liberal Democrats gain from Conservative		Swing		

=== Mortlake & Barnes Common ===
Mortlake & Barnes Common
Party	Candidate	Votes	%	±%
Conservative	Paul Avon*	1,986	49.34	+0.36
Conservative	Gemma Curran*	1,901	47.23	−2.70
Liberal Democrats	Alice Bridges-Westcott	1,758	43.68	+20.50
Conservative	Tim Mack	1,757	43.65	−0.49
Liberal Democrats	Tim Catchpole	1,722	42.78	+24.77
Liberal Democrats	Michael Dingemans	1,665	41.37	+16.81
Labour	Christina Atchison	379	9.42	−1.03
Labour	Edward Jones	282	7.01	−3.36
Labour	Maureen Metzger	282	7.01	−1.82
Turnout		4,033	49.29	
Conservative hold		Swing		
Conservative hold		Swing		
Liberal Democrats gain from Conservative		Swing		

=== North Richmond ===
North Richmond
Party	Candidate	Votes	%	±%
Liberal Democrats	Nancy Baldwin	1,920	45.66	+16.25
Liberal Democrats	Richard Pyne	1,725	41.02	+12.40
Liberal Democrats	Richard Warren	1,714	40.76	+11.52
Conservative	Jane Keep	1,687	40.12	−5.09
Conservative	Stephen Speak*	1,671	39.74	−1.28
Conservative	Jason Hilder	1,654	39.33	−4.80
Labour	Fiona O'Farrell	655	15.58	+5.13
Labour	Thomas Absolon	601	14.29	+3.92
Labour	Maxwell Smith	540	12.84	+2.55
Turnout		4,214	50.66	
Liberal Democrats gain from Conservative		Swing		
Liberal Democrats gain from Conservative		Swing		
Liberal Democrats gain from Conservative		Swing		

=== South Richmond ===
South Richmond
Party	Candidate	Votes	%	±%
Conservative	Pamela Fleming*	1,921	48.52	−6.38
Conservative	Peter Buckwell*	1,849	46.70	−6.05
Liberal Democrats	Bill Newton Dunn	1,749	44.18	+21.00
Conservative	Thomas O'Malley*	1,743	44.03	−4.95
Liberal Democrats	Paulina Vassileva	1,708	43.14	+23.02
Green	Elizabeth Nash	1,208	30.51	+13.92
Labour	Deborah Huggett	338	8.54	−3.46
Labour	Edwin Makurah	290	7.33	−4.44
Labour	Michael Freedman	268	6.77	−2.67
UKIP	Robert Leon	81	2.05	−6.28
Turnout		3,960	48.70	
Conservative hold		Swing		
Conservative hold		Swing		
Liberal Democrats gain from Conservative		Swing		

=== South Twickenham ===
South Twickenham
Party	Candidate	Votes	%	±%
Liberal Democrats	Katie Mansfield	2,326	58.41	+31.18
Liberal Democrats	Michael Butlin	2,200	55.25	+28.14
Green	Richard Bennett	1,548	38.87	+19.53
Conservative	Clare Head*	1,483	37.24	−10.85
Conservative	David Porter*	1,357	34.08	−11.93
Conservative	David Marlow*	1,309	32.87	−11.03
Labour	Beatriz Lees	377	9.47	−5.48
Labour	Sampson Low	330	8.29	−7.27
Labour	Manju Walia	277	6.96	−7.93
Turnout		3,987	53.78	
Liberal Democrats gain from Conservative		Swing		
Liberal Democrats gain from Conservative		Swing		
Green gain from Conservative		Swing		

=== St Margarets & North Twickenham ===
St Margarets & North Twickenham
Party	Candidate	Votes	%	±%
Liberal Democrats	Geoff Acton*	2,718	59.63	+15.43
Liberal Democrats	Ben Khosa*	2,559	56.14	+16.16
Liberal Democrats	Alexander Ehmann*	2,528	55.46	+17.91
Conservative	Helen Edward	1,212	26.59	−9.53
Conservative	Nathaniel Ikeazor	1,128	24.75	−10.63
Conservative	Phillip Taylor	1,087	23.85	−5.93
Labour	Rachel Evans	644	14.13	+2.22
Labour	Gordon Alexander	595	13.05	+2.59
Labour	Adam Hinton	551	12.09	+4.01
Independent	Thomas Pangbourne	182	3.99	N/A
Turnout		4,570	52.91	
Liberal Democrats hold		Swing		
Liberal Democrats hold		Swing		
Liberal Democrats hold		Swing		

=== Teddington ===
Teddington
Party	Candidate	Votes	%	±%
Liberal Democrats	Richard Baker	2,571	59.92	+17.91
Liberal Democrats	Martin Elengorn*	2,491	58.05	+17.98
Liberal Democrats	Tim Woodcock	2,432	56.58	+16.96
Conservative	Elizabeth Foster	1,379	32.14	−6.16
Conservative	Simon Lamb	1,303	30.37	−3.93
Conservative	Richard Fitter	1,280	29.83	−6.06
Labour	Penny Banaji	361	8.41	−2.84
Labour	Neil Browning	339	7.90	−3.06
Labour	Louise Creighton	314	7.32	−2.87
Turnout		4,297	53.16	
Liberal Democrats hold		Swing		
Liberal Democrats hold		Swing		
Liberal Democrats hold		Swing		

=== Twickenham Riverside ===
Twickenham Riverside
Party	Candidate	Votes	%	±%
Liberal Democrats	Julia Neden-Watts	2,283	57.52	+23.24
Liberal Democrats	James Chard	2,243	56.51	+23.53
Liberal Democrats	Roger Crouch	2,009	50.62	+20.96
Conservative	Susan Chappell*	1,256	31.65	−11.23
Conservative	Helen Hill*	1,111	27.99	−8.60
Conservative	Alexandre Andrews	1,110	27.97	−9.41
Women's Equality	Caroline Rayfield	741	18.67	N/A
Labour	Rhonda Evans	339	8.54	−2.38
Labour	David Harley	250	6.30	−3.95
Labour	Harvey Woolfe	215	5.42	−5.41
Turnout		3,974	50.79	
Liberal Democrats gain from Conservative		Swing		
Liberal Democrats gain from Conservative		Swing		
Liberal Democrats gain from Conservative		Swing		

=== West Twickenham ===
West Twickenham
Party	Candidate	Votes	%	±%
Liberal Democrats	Piers Allen*	2,043	51.20	+14.69
Liberal Democrats	Helen Lee-Parsons*	2,031	50.90	+15.76
Liberal Democrats	Alan Juriansz	1,916	48.02	+17.85
Conservative	Jane Boulton*	1,141	28.60	−4.59
Conservative	Paul Nacmanson	1,057	26.49	−5.88
Conservative	Sheba Sogol	939	23.53	−4.77
Labour	Jennifer Churchill	785	19.67	+4.44
Labour	Paul Tanto	735	18.42	+4.54
Labour	John Plastow	693	17.37	+4.31
UKIP	David Sparrow	105	2.63	−9.23
Turnout		3,996	49.54	
Liberal Democrats hold		Swing		
Liberal Democrats hold		Swing		
Liberal Democrats gain from Conservative		Swing		

=== Whitton ===
Whitton
Party	Candidate	Votes	%	±%
Liberal Democrats	Jo Humphreys	1,935	51.79	+25.95
Liberal Democrats	Liz Jaeger*	1,768	47.32	+15.70
Liberal Democrats	Rob O'Carroll	1,648	44.11	+21.31
Conservative	Gareth Elliott*	1,365	36.54	−4.34
Conservative	Sophie Lister	1,271	34.02	+3.03
Conservative	Grant Healy*	1,201	32.15	−0.19
Labour	Jasmin Athwal	448	11.99	−0.18
Labour	Daniel Hilton	401	10.73	−0.44
Labour	Mark Hopkins	370	9.90	+0.88
Independent	Paul Hampartsoumian	365	9.77	−3.66
Turnout		3,742	51.31	
Liberal Democrats gain from Conservative		Swing		
Liberal Democrats hold		Swing		
Liberal Democrats gain from Conservative		Swing		

== By-elections between 2018 and 2022 ==
=== East Sheen ===
East Sheen By-Election 18 July 2019
Party	Candidate	Votes	%	±%
Liberal Democrats	Julia Cambridge	1,809	58.9	▲11.7
Conservative	Helen Edward	1,090	35.4	▼10.4
Women's Equality	Trixie Rawlinson	90	2.93	New
Labour	Giles Oakley	82	2.6	▼3.1
Majority		719	23.4	▲22.1
Turnout		3,070	40.70	▼14.54
Liberal Democrats hold		Swing		

=== Hampton Wick ===
Hampton Wick By-Election 6 May 2021
Party	Candidate	Votes	%	±%
Liberal Democrats	Petra Fleming	2,447	52.4	▲11.5
Conservative	Nina Watson	1,232	26.4	▼0.9
Green	Chas Warlow	538	11.5	▼15.5
Labour	Nick Dexter	446	9.5	▲3.1
Majority		1,215	26.0	N/A
Turnout		4,663	56.7	▲4.5
Liberal Democrats gain from Green		Swing	N/A	
