= South West (London Assembly constituency) =

- Territorial constituency for the London Assembly
- South West shown within London
- Created: 2000
- Number of members: One
- Member: Gareth Roberts
- Party: Liberal Democrat
- Last election: 2024
- Next election: 2028

South West is a constituency represented in the London Assembly. It is represented by Gareth Roberts of the Liberal Democrats.

It covers the combined area of the London Borough of Hounslow, the Royal Borough of Kingston upon Thames, and the London Borough of Richmond upon Thames.

== Overlapping constituencies ==
The equivalent seats in the House of Commons are:

- Brentford and Isleworth (Labour)
- Feltham and Heston (Labour)
- Hammersmith and Chiswick (Labour)
- Kingston and Surbiton (Liberal Democrats)
- Richmond Park (Liberal Democrats)
- Twickenham (Liberal Democrats)

== Assembly members ==
Election	Member	Party
2000	Tony Arbour	Conservative
2021	Nick Rogers	Conservative
2024	Gareth Roberts	Liberal Democrats

== Assembly election results ==
2024 London Assembly election: South West
Party	Candidate	Constituency			List		
Party	Candidate	Votes	%	±%	Votes	%	±%
Liberal Democrats	Gareth Roberts	66,675	32.6	▲4.4	47,461	23.2	
Labour	Marcela Benedetti	50,656	24.8	▼1.5	54,108	26.4	
Conservative	Ron Mushiso	49,981	24.4	▼7.5	53,042	25.9	
Green	Chas Warlow	17,696	8.6	▼2.1	19,980	9.8	
Reform	Steve Chilcott	14,450	7.1	▲5.5	11,950	5.8	
Independent	Abigail Dawn Hardy	5,205	2.5	New			
Rejoin EU					5,165	2.5	
Animal Welfare					3,618	1.8	
Britain First					2,525	1.2	
CPA					1,969	1.0	
SDP					1,869	0.9	
Independent	Laurence Fox				1,220	0.6	
Independent	Farah London				731	0.4	
Communist					672	0.3	
Heritage					389	0.2	
Independent	Gabe Romualdo				127	0.1	
Majority		16,019	7.8	N/A			
Valid votes		204,663			204,826		
Invalid votes		1,281			1,127		
Turnout		205,944	45.2	▼2.6	205,953	45.2	
Liberal Democrats gain from Conservative		Swing		▲6.0			

2021 London Assembly election: South West
Party	Candidate	Votes	%	±%
Conservative	Nicholas Rogers	69,212	31.9	−7.6
Liberal Democrats	Gareth Roberts	61,222	28.2	+13.9
Labour Co-op	Candice Atterton	56,945	26.3	−3.1
Green	Andree Frieze	23,135	10.7	+1.5
Reform	Dominique Day	3,396	1.6	New
Let London Live	Sylvia da Barca	2,836	1.3	New
Majority		7,990	3.7	−6.4
Total formal votes		216,746		
Informal votes		2,840		
Turnout		219,586	47.8	
Conservative hold		Swing		

2016 London Assembly election: South West
Party	Candidate	Votes	%	±%
Conservative	Tony Arbour	84,381	39.5	−0.3
Labour	Martin Whelton	62,937	29.4	+0.7
Liberal Democrats	Rosina Robson	30,654	14.3	−2.4
Green	Andree Frieze	19,745	9.2	−0.6
UKIP	Alan Craig	14,983	7.0	+2.1
Socialist (GB)	Adam Buick	1,065	0.5	New
Majority		21,444	10.1	−1.0
Total formal votes				
Informal votes				
Turnout		213,765		
Conservative hold		Swing		

2012 London Assembly election: South West
Party	Candidate	Votes	%	±%
Conservative	Tony Arbour	69,151	39.8	−1.0
Labour	Lisa Homan	49,889	28.7	+12.7
Liberal Democrats	Munira Wilson	28,947	16.7	−9.8
Green	Daniel Goldsmith	17,070	9.8	+3.0
UKIP	Jeffrey Bolter	8,505	4.9	+2.9
Majority		19,262	11.1	−3.2
Total formal votes		173,562	98.6	
Rejected ballots		2,518	1.4	
Turnout		176,080	40.2	−5.2
Conservative hold		Swing		

2008 London Assembly election: South West
Party	Candidate	Votes	%	±%
Conservative	Tony Arbour	76,913	40.8	+7.8
Liberal Democrats	Stephen Knight	49,985	26.5	–3.8
Labour	Ansuya Sodha	30,190	16.0	–1.0
Green	John Hunt	12,774	6.8	+0.1
National Front	Andrew Cripps	4,754	2.5	New
UKIP	Peter Dul	3,779	2.0	–6.4
Christian (CPA)	Sue May	3,718	1.9	–0.1
Free England Party	Andrew Constantine	2,908	1.5	New
English Democrat	Roger Cooper	1,874	1.0	New
Left List	Tansy Hoskins	1,526	0.8	New
Majority		26,928	14.3	+11.6
Turnout		188,421	45.4	+6.9
Conservative hold		Swing	+5.8	

2004 London Assembly election: South West
Party	Candidate	Votes	%	±%
Conservative	Tony Arbour	48,858	33.0	–2.4
Liberal Democrats	Dee Doocey	44,791	30.3	+0.1
Labour	Seema Malhotra	25,225	17.0	–5.8
UKIP	A. G. Hindle	12,477	8.4	New
Green	Judy Maciejowska	9,866	6.7	–3.1
Respect	O. M. Waraich	3,785	2.6	New
CPA	P. J. Flower	3,008	2.0	New
Majority		4,067	2.7	–2.5
Turnout		148,010	38.5	+3.1
Conservative hold		Swing	–1.2	

2000 London Assembly election: South West
Party	Candidate	Votes	%	±%
Conservative	Tony Arbour	48,248	35.4	N/A
Liberal Democrats	Geoff Pope	41,189	30.2	N/A
Labour	Jagdish Sharma	31,065	22.8	N/A
Green	Judy Maciejowska	13,426	9.8	N/A
London Socialist	Danny Faith	2,319	1.7	N/A
Majority		7,059	5.2	N/A
Turnout		136,247	35.4	N/A
Conservative win (new seat)				

== Mayoral election results ==
Below are the results for the candidate which received the highest share of the popular vote in the constituency at each mayoral election.

Year	Party	Candidate
2000	Independent	Ken Livingstone
2004	Labour	Ken Livingstone
2008	Conservative	Boris Johnson
2012	Conservative	Boris Johnson
2016	Conservative	Zac Goldsmith
2021	Conservative	Shaun Bailey
2024	Labour	Sadiq Khan

2024 London mayoral election (South West)
Party	Candidate	Votes	%	±%
Labour	Sadiq Khan	77,011	37.5	N/A
Conservative	Susan Hall	68,856	33.5	N/A
Liberal Democrats	Rob Blackie	25,579	12.5	N/A
Green	Zoë Garbett	10,132	4.93	N/A
Reform	Howard Cox	6,634	3.23	N/A
Independent	Natalie Campbell	3,202	1.56	N/A
SDP	Amy Gallagher	2,771	1.35	N/A
Animal Welfare	Femy Amin	2,640	1.29	N/A
Independent	Tarun Ghulati	2,436	1.19	N/A
Count Binface for Mayor of London	Count Binface	2,304	1.12	N/A
Independent	Andreas Michli	1,669	0.813	N/A
Britain First	Nick Scanlon	1,600	0.779	N/A
London Real	Brian Rose	528	0.257	N/A
Turnout		206,109	45.3%	−2.59%
Rejected ballots		747		
Registered electors		455,381		

2021 London mayoral election (South West)
Party	Candidate	1st round		2nd round			1st round votesTransfer votes, 2nd round
Party	Candidate	Total	Of round	Transfers	Total	Of round	1st round votesTransfer votes, 2nd round
Conservative	Shaun Bailey	77,012	36.4%				
Labour	Sadiq Khan	73,939	34.9%				
Liberal Democrats	Luisa Porritt	21,104	9.96%				
Green	Siân Berry	16,264	7.68%				
Reclaim	Laurence Fox	4,271	2.02%				
Independent	Niko Omilana	3,199	1.51%				
Rejoin EU	Richard Hewison	2,515	1.19%				
London Real	Brian Rose	2,278	1.08%				
Count Binface for Mayor of London	Count Binface	1,986	0.938%				
Women's Equality	Mandu Reid	1,532	0.723%				
Let London Live	Piers Corbyn	1,375	0.649%				
Animal Welfare	Vanessa Hudson	1,286	0.607%				
UKIP	Peter John Gammons	1,047	0.494%				
Heritage	David Kurten	753	0.356%				
Independent	Farah London	696	0.329%				
SDP	Steve Kelleher	657	0.31%				
Renew	Kam Balayev	577	0.272%				
Independent	Max Fosh	515	0.243%				
Independent	Nims Obunge	474	0.224%				
Burning Pink	Valerie Brown	325	0.153%				
Turnout		219,800	47.9%				
Registered electors		459,309					

2016 London mayoral election (South West)
Party	Candidate	1st round		2nd round			1st round votesTransfer votes, 2nd round
Party	Candidate	Total	Of round	Transfers	Total	Of round	1st round votesTransfer votes, 2nd round
Conservative	Zac Goldsmith	97,141	45.7%				
Labour	Sadiq Khan	70,224	33%				
Liberal Democrats	Caroline Pidgeon	15,119	7.11%				
Green	Siân Berry	11,038	5.19%				
UKIP	Peter Whittle	6,185	2.91%				
Women's Equality	Sophie Walker	3,866	1.82%				
Respect	George Galloway	2,645	1.24%				
Britain First	Paul Golding	2,200	1.03%				
Cannabis is Safer than Alcohol	Lee Eli Harris	1,544	0.726%				
Independent	Prince Zylinski	1,495	0.703%				
BNP	David Furness	931	0.438%				
One Love	Ankit Love	345	0.162%				
Turnout		216,202	49.5%				
Registered electors		436,362					

2012 London mayoral election (South West)
Party	Candidate	1st round		2nd round			1st round votesTransfer votes, 2nd round
Party	Candidate	Total	Of round	Transfers	Total	Of round	1st round votesTransfer votes, 2nd round
Conservative	Boris Johnson	92,180	53%				
Labour	Ken Livingstone	51,486	29.6%				
Liberal Democrats	Brian Paddick	9,702	5.58%				
Green	Jenny Jones	7,868	4.52%				
Independent	Siobhan Benita	7,355	4.23%				
UKIP	Lawrence Webb	3,601	2.07%				
BNP	Carlos Cortiglia	1,703	0.979%				
Turnout		175,487	40.1%				
Registered electors		437,945					

2008 London mayoral election (South West)
Party	Candidate	1st round		2nd round			1st round votesTransfer votes, 2nd round
Party	Candidate	Total	Of round	Transfers	Total	Of round	1st round votesTransfer votes, 2nd round
Conservative	Boris Johnson	90,061	47.6%				
Labour	Ken Livingstone	57,938	30.6%				
Liberal Democrats	Brian Paddick	25,009	13.2%				
Green	Siân Berry	6,061	3.2%				
BNP	Richard Barnbrook	4,491	2.37%				
Christian Choice	Alan Craig	2,180	1.15%				
UKIP	Gerard Batten	1,563	0.825%				
Left List	Lindsey German	961	0.507%				
English Democrat	Matt O'Connor	801	0.423%				
Independent	Winston McKenzie	299	0.158%				
Turnout		191,911	46.2%				
Registered electors		415,092					

2004 London mayoral election (South West)
Party	Candidate	1st round		2nd round			1st round votesTransfer votes, 2nd round
Party	Candidate	Total	Of round	Transfers	Total	Of round	1st round votesTransfer votes, 2nd round
Labour	Ken Livingstone	53,156	35.2%				
Conservative	Steve Norris	45,973	30.4%				
Liberal Democrats	Simon Hughes	28,910	19.1%				
UKIP	Frank Maloney	7,969	5.28%				
Green	Darren Johnson	4,623	3.06%				
BNP	Julian Leppert	3,706	2.45%				
Respect	Lindsey German	2,870	1.9%				
CPA	Ram Gidoomal	2,812	1.86%				
Independent Working Class Action	Lorna Reid	598	0.396%				
Independent	Tammy Nagalingam	438	0.29%				
Turnout		154,747	40.2%				
Registered electors		384,653					

2000 London mayoral election (South West)
Party	Candidate	1st round		2nd round			1st round votesTransfer votes, 2nd round
Party	Candidate	Total	Of round	Transfers	Total	Of round	1st round votesTransfer votes, 2nd round
Independent	Ken Livingstone	52,457	36.3%				
Conservative	Steve Norris	41,618	28.8%				
Liberal Democrats	Susan Kramer	23,745	16.4%				
Labour	Frank Dobson	15,719	10.9%				
CPA	Ram Gidoomal	3,195	2.21%				
Green	Darren Johnson	2,916	2.02%				
BNP	Michael Newland	1,862	1.29%				
UKIP	Damian Hockney	1,397	0.966%				
Independent	Ashwin Kumar	658	0.455%				
Pro-Motorist Small Shop	Geoffrey Ben-Nathan	637	0.441%				
Natural Law	Geoffrey Clements	356	0.246%				
Turnout		147,100	38.2%				
Registered electors		384,930					
