= Barnes (ward) =

Electoral ward in London, England

- Electoral ward for the Richmond upon Thames London Borough Council
- Borough: Richmond upon Thames
- County: Greater London
- Population: 10,238 (2021)
- Major settlements: Barnes, London
- Area: 2.769 km²

Current electoral ward
- Created: 1965
- Seats: 3 (since 1968); 4 (until 1968)

Barnes is an electoral ward in the London Borough of Richmond upon Thames. The ward was first used in the 1964 elections and elects three councillors to Richmond upon Thames London Borough Council.

== Richmond upon Thames council elections ==
=== 2026 election ===
The election took place on 7 May 2026.

2026 Richmond upon Thames London Borough Council election: Barnes
Party	Candidate	Votes	%	±%
Liberal Democrats	Fiona Sacks*	1,800	45.4	−6.3
Liberal Democrats	Andy Hale*	1,728	43.6	−6.2
Liberal Democrats	Duncan Rasor	1,586	40.0	−9.4
Conservative	Helen Edward	1,365	34.4	−6.2
Conservative	Carlos Garofolin	1,216	30.7	−12.7
Conservative	Sandy Urquhart	1,212	30.6	−7.2
Green	Kieran Sheedy	397	10.0	N/A
Green	Miranda Lewis	382	9.6	N/A
Reform	Mark Fox	380	9.6	N/A
Green	Kim Marshall	367	9.3	N/A
Reform	Christopher MacNee	346	8.7	N/A
Reform	Guy Rose	328	8.3	N/A
Labour	Stephen Russell	151	3.8	−2.8
Labour	Sam Cullen	126	3.2	−2.6
Independent	Ivan Avanessov	105	2.6	N/A
Labour	Sujata Patel	103	2.6	−3.8
Turnout		3,974	51.64	+1.1
Registered electors		7,695		
Liberal Democrats hold		Swing		
Liberal Democrats hold		Swing		
Liberal Democrats hold		Swing		

=== 2022 election ===
The election took place on 5 May 2022.

2022 Richmond upon Thames London Borough Council election: Barnes
Party	Candidate	Votes	%	±%
Liberal Democrats	Fiona Sacks	1,960	51.7	
Liberal Democrats	Andy Hale	1,890	49.8	
Liberal Democrats	Marjory Millum	1,874	49.4	
Conservative	Aphra Brandreth	1,646	43.4	
Conservative	Helen Edward	1,539	40.6	
Conservative	Sara Gezdari	1,436	37.8	
Labour	Alec Lever	250	6.6	
Labour	Sujata Patel	242	6.4	
Labour	Ayar Ata	221	5.8	
Turnout		3,794	50.5	
Liberal Democrats win (new boundaries)				
Liberal Democrats win (new boundaries)				
Liberal Democrats win (new boundaries)				
