= 2024 London Assembly election =

- 2 May 2024

All 25 seats in the London Assembly 13 seats needed for a majority
- Turnout: 40.5% ▼2.2%

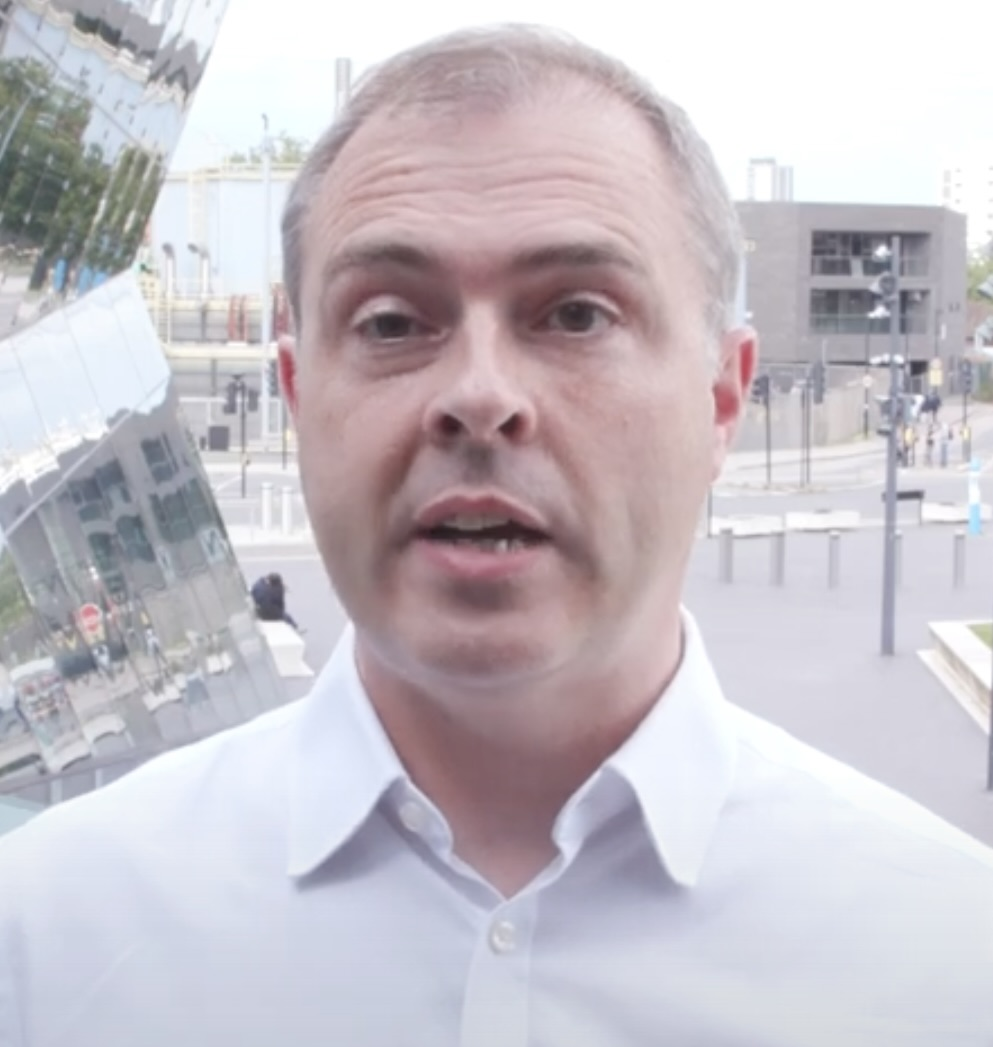

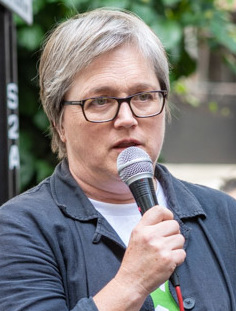

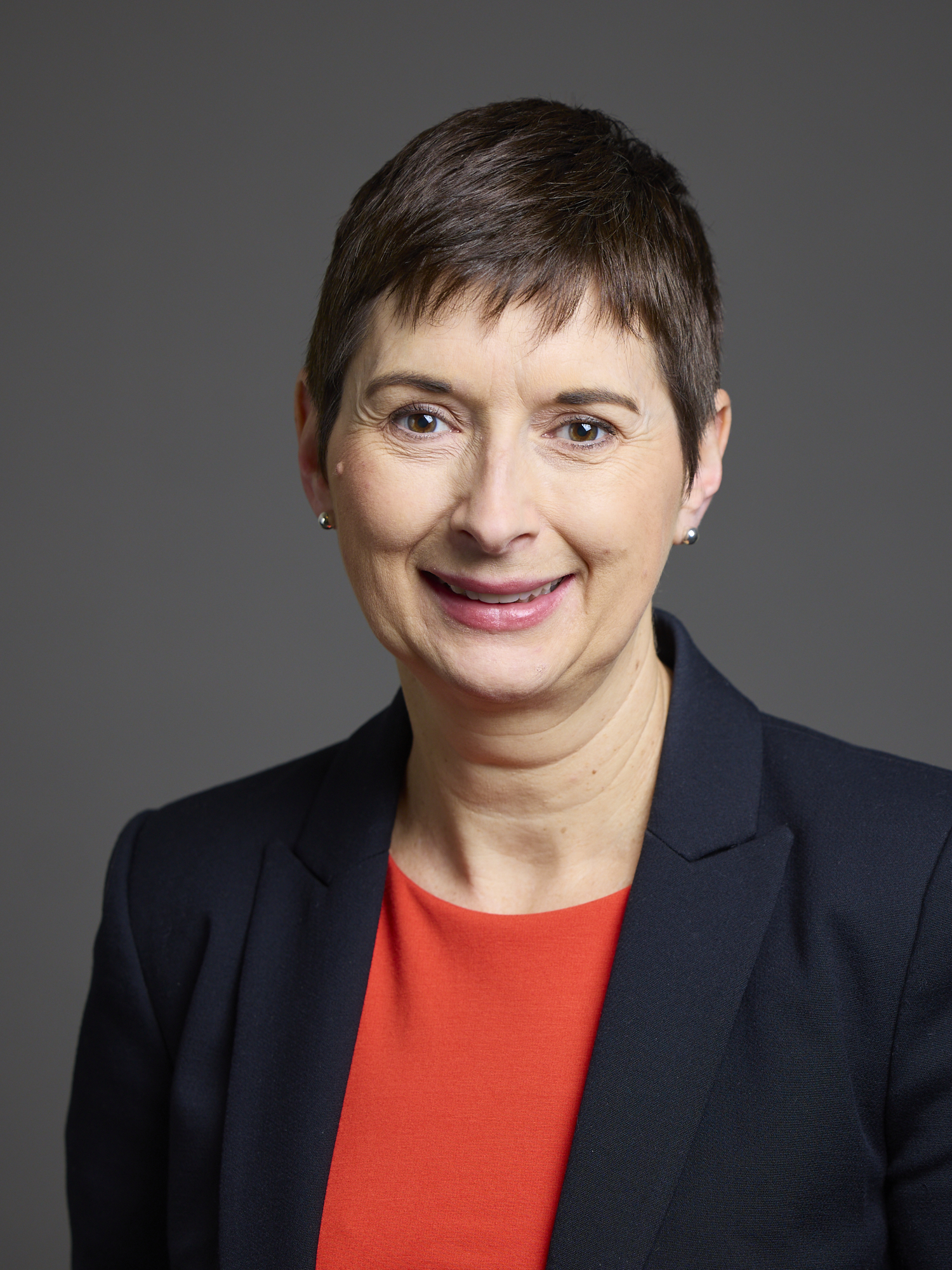

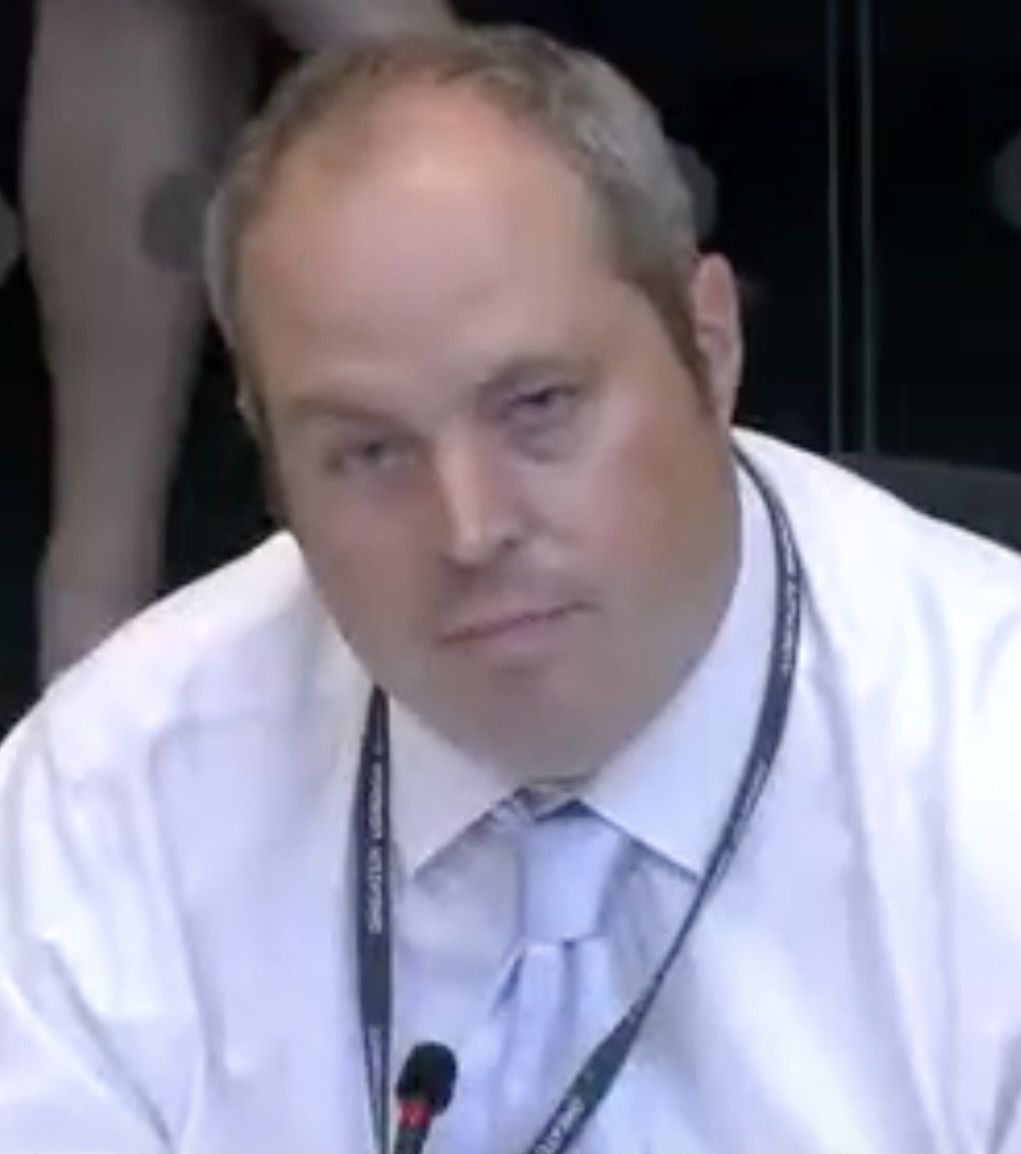
	First party	Second party	Third party
Leader	Len Duvall	Neil Garratt	Caroline Russell
Party	Labour	Conservative	Green
Leader's seat	Greenwich and Lewisham	Croydon and Sutton	Additional member
Last election	11 seats	9 seats	3 seats
Seats won	11 (Note: Includes 10 AMs sponsored by the Co-operative Party, who are designated Labour and Co-operative.)	8	3
Seat change	Steady	▼1	Steady
Constituency vote	983,216	673,036	319,869
% and swing	39.7% ▼2.0 pp	27.2% ▼4.8 pp	12.9% ▼0.1 pp
Party vote	951,056	648,269	286,746
% and swing	38.4% ▲0.3 pp	26.2% ▼4.5 pp	11.6% ▼0.2 pp
	Fourth party	Fifth party
Leader	Caroline Pidgeon	Alex Wilson
Party	Liberal Democrats	Reform UK
Leader's seat	Additional member (stood down)	Additional member (Note: Not an incumbent but stood for a list seat and won)
Last election	2 seats	0 seats
Seats won	2	1
Seat change	Steady	▲1
Constituency vote	271,049	183,361
% and swing	11.0% ▲0.7 pp	7.4% ▲5.0 pp
Party vote	215,682	145,409
% and swing	8.7% ▲1.4 pp	5.9% ▲4.9 pp
- Results for constituencies and the additional members (bottom)

The 2024 London Assembly election was held on 2 May 2024 to elect the members of the London Assembly. It took place on the same day as the 2024 London mayoral election, local elections across England and Wales and one parliamentary by-election.

== Background ==
In the 2021 London Assembly elections, Labour won eleven seats, the Conservatives nine, the Green Party three, and the Liberal Democrats two.

== Electoral system ==
Members of the London Assembly are elected through a combination of both first past the post and closed list proportional representation. This system is commonly referred to as the additional member system. Fourteen members are elected in single member constituencies with the candidate receiving the largest number of votes becoming the Assembly Member for that constituency. An additional 11 "London members" are also elected from the whole of London, with parties submitting lists of up to 25 candidates. For a party to receive one or more London members, it needs to attain at least 5% of the vote across London. This process divides the remaining seats proportionally to the vote share of the parties with the use of the modified D'Hondt method allocating the seats. This system ensures overall proportionality with the 11 additional members being allocated in a corrective manner.

Constituency candidates need to submit a deposit of £1,000, which is returned if they get at least 5% of the vote. A London-wide list requires a deposit of £5,000, which is returned if the list gets 2.5% of the vote.

== London-wide list candidates ==
2024 London Assembly election (London-wide)
List	Candidates	Votes	Of total (%)	± from prev.
Labour	Elly Baker (86,460), Sakina Sheikh (79,255), John Howard, James Beckles, Bora Kwon, Jasbir Anand, Martin Whelton, Omid Miri, Devina Paul, Sian Eiles, Patrick Lilley	951,056	38.4%	▲0.3
Conservative	Susan Hall (Note: Stood as a mayoral candidate) (162,067), Shaun Bailey (129,654), Emma Best (108,045), Andrew Boff (92,610), Alessandro Georgiou (81,034), Nicholas McLean (72,030), Nicholas Vandyke, Laila Cunningham, Richard Mills, Katherine Lymer, Will Jackson	648,269	26.2%	▼4.5
Green	Siân Berry (Note: Berry resigned from the Assembly three days after the election so that Garbett would be co-opted to replace her) (286,746), Caroline Russell (143,373), Zack Polanski (95,582), Zoë Garbett (Note: Garbett was co-opted into the Assembly after Berry resigned three days after the election, and in May 2026 resigned from the Assembly to become the Mayor of Hackney) (71,687), Benali Hamdache (Note: Hamdache was co-opted into the Assembly after Garbett resigned in May 2026), Scott Ainslie, Ria Patel, Nate Higgins, Claire Sheppard, Shahrar Ali, Pete Elliott	286,746	11.6%	▼0.2
Liberal Democrats	Hina Bokhari (107,891), Rob Blackie (71,894), Irina von Wiese, Gareth Roberts, Chris Maines, John Sweeney, William Houngbo, Michael Bukola, Chris Annous, Sue Wixley, Sarah Hoyle	215,682	8.7%	▲1.4
Reform	Alex Wilson (145,409), Howard Cox (72,705), Mark Simpson, Ian Price, Steve Chilcott, Roger Gravett, Tony Glover, Alan Cook, Raj Forhad, Nicola Pateman, Anthony Goodwin, Tania Marszalek, David Sandground, Marian Newton, Tony Sharp	145,409	5.9%	▲4.9
Rejoin EU	Richard Hewison, Alex Kerr, Charlotte Blake, Brendan Donnelly, Alessandro Gallo, Briony Kapoor, Marianne Mandujano, Drew Miles, Ben Rend, Laurence Williams, Jaki Airey, Simon Bezer, Jas Alduk	62,528	2.5%	▲0.6
Animal Welfare	Vanessa Hudson, Saffron Gloyne, Alex Bourke, Femy Amin, Bel Jacobs, Mark Scott, Julian Weisman	41,303	1.7%	Steady
Britain First	Nick Scanlon	32,085	1.3%	New
CPA	Maureen Martin, Simeon Ademolake, Helen Spiby-Vann, Amelia Allao, Ashley Dickenson, Eunice Odesanmi, Des Coke, Katherine Hortense, Zion Amodu, Lucy Baiye-Gaman	26,798	1.1%	Steady
SDP	Amy Gallagher, Huge de Burgh, Stephen Balogh, Jon Mabbutt, Manny Lawal, Jane Gibson, Steve Kelleher, Alastair Mellon, Laurenzo Mefsut, Daniel Woodruffe, Jake Painter, David Hargreaves, Les Beaumont	23,021	0.9	▲0.6
No description (Note: Fox is leader of the Reclaim Party, but is not declared as such.)	Laurence Fox	13,795	0.6%	New
Independent	Farah London	13,048	0.5%	New
Communist	Ross Crawford, William Dry, Nigel Green, Anita Halpin, Arnes Ramic, Ross Leonard, Laura Miller, Michael Squires, Robin Talbot, Paul Whitehouse, Ruth Wilson, Benjamin Woodward	10,915	0.4%	▲0.1
Heritage	Maria Candilo, David Poulden, Michael Watson, Dafydd Morriss, Henryk Mackiewicz	4,431	0.2%	▼0.3
Independent	Gabe Romualdo	1,601	0.1%	New

== Constituency candidates ==
Constituency	Labour	Conservative	Green	Lib Dems	Reform UK	Others
Barnet & Camden	Anne Clarke (Note: Incumbent seeking re-election) (70,749, 1st)	Julie Redmond (51,606, 2nd)	Kate Tokley (18,405, 3rd)	Scott Emery (12,335, 4th)	Raj Forhad (Note: Also a candidate for the London-wide list) (7,703, 5th)	Bill Martin (SPGB) (1,639, 6th)
Bexley & Bromley	Kevin McKenna (50,174, 2nd)	Thomas Turrell (Note: New candidate for incumbent party) (90,103, 1st)	Marley King (15,813, 5th)	Gita Bapat (18,730, 4th)	Alan Cook (27,603, 3rd)	
Brent & Harrow	Krupesh Hirani (63,867, 1st)	Stefan Bucovineanul-Voloseniuc (55,039, 2nd)	Nida Al-Fulaij (15,167, 3rd)	Jonny Singh (12,068, 4th)	Ian Price (11,243, 5th)	
City & East	Unmesh Desai (99,570, 1st)	Freddie Downing (29,083, 2nd)	Joe Hudson-Small (29,073, 3rd)	Patrick Stillman (11,416, 5th)	David Sandground (14,535, 4th)	Lois Austin (TUSC) (4,710, 7th); Ak Goodman (Ind) (5,310, 6th)
Croydon & Sutton	Maddie Henson (54,380, 2nd)	Neil Garratt (64,674, 1st)	Peter Underwood (19,434, 4th)	Trish Fivey (29,160, 3rd)	Marian Newton (14,375, 5th)	April Ashley (TUSC) (2,766, 6th)
Ealing & Hillingdon	Bassam Mahfouz (72,356, 1st)	Henry Higgins (67,495, 2nd)	Jess Lee (22,984, 3rd)	Kuldev Sehra (15,293, 4th)	Anthony Goodwin (15,247, 5th)	
Enfield & Haringey	Joanne McCartney (78,880, 1st)	Calum McGillivray (32,778, 2nd)	Katie Knight (26,956, 3rd)	Guy Russo (14,284, 4th)	Roger Gravett (10,973, 5th)	
Greenwich & Lewisham	Len Duvall (80,101, 1st)	Kieran Terry (25,960, 3rd)	Karin Tearle (28,294, 2nd)	Josh Matthews (11,975, 5th)	Mark Simpson (13,405, 4th)	
Havering & Redbridge	Guy Williams (49,561, 2nd)	Keith Prince (65,037, 1st)	Kim Arrowsmith (15,010, 4th)	Fraser Coppin (8,240, 6th)	Alex Wilson (19,696, 3rd)	Mohammed Asif (Ind) (11,768, 5th); Andy Walker (TUSC) (2,145, 7th)
Lambeth & Southwark	Marina Ahmad (84,768, 1st)	Christine Wallace (21,121, 4th)	Claire Sheppard (35,144, 2nd)	Chris French (22,030 3rd)	Tony Sharp (8,942, 5th)	Adam Buick (SPGB) (2,082, 6th)
Merton & Wandsworth	Leonie Cooper (77,235, 1st)	Ellie Cox (49,812, 2nd)	Pippa Maslin (19,124, 4th)	Sue Wixley (21,418, 3rd)	Tania Marszalek (8,063, 5th)	
North East	Sem Moema (104,088, 1st)	Pearce Branigan (27,769, 3rd)	Antoinette Fernandez (44,342, 2nd)	Rebecca Jones (12,920, 4th)	Tony Glover (9,086, 5th)	Tan Bui (Ind) (1,804, 7th); Nancy Taaffe (TUSC) (5,595, 6th)
South West	Marcela Benedetti (50,656, 2nd)	Ron Mushiso (49,981, 3rd)	Chas Warlow (17,696, 4th)	Gareth Roberts (66,675, 1st)	Steve Chilcott (14,450, 5th)	Abigail Hardy (Ind) (5,205, 6th)
West Central	James Small-Edwards (46,831, 1st)	Tony Devenish (42,578, 2nd)	Rajiv Sinha (12,427, 4th)	Christophe Noblet (14,505, 3rd)	Nicola Pateman (8,040, 5th)	
Source: London Elects

== Assembly members not standing for re-election ==
- Caroline Pidgeon, Liberal Democrat London-wide list member since 2008.
- Onkar Sahota, Labour member for Ealing and Hillingdon since 2012.
- Nick Rogers, Conservative member for South West since 2021.
- Peter Fortune, Conservative member for Bexley and Bromley since 2021.

== Opinion polls ==
=== Constituency ===
Date(s) conducted	Pollster	Client	Sample size	Lab	Con	Green	Lib Dem	Reform	Others	Lead
24-30 Apr 2024	YouGov	N/A	1,192	46%	21%	12%	11%	8%	2%	25%
6 May 2021	2021 Assembly election		—	41.2%	32.0%	13.0%	10.3%	2.4%	1.1%	9.2%

=== Party list ===
Date(s) conducted	Pollster	Client	Sample size	Lab	Con	Green	Lib Dem	Reform	Others	Lead
24-30 Apr 2024	YouGov	N/A	1,192	43%	21%	12%	11%	8%	4%	22%
6 May 2021	2021 Assembly election		—	38.1%	30.7%	11.8%	7.3%	1.0%	11.1%	7.4%

== Results ==
Party	Constituency			Party			Total seats	+/–
Party	Votes	%	Seats	Votes	%	Seats	Total seats	+/–
Labour (Note: Includes 10 AMs sponsored by the Co-operative Party, who are designated Labour and Co-operative.)	983,216	39.75	10	951,056	38.40	1	11	0
Conservative	673,036	27.21	3	648,269	26.17	5	8	−1
Green	319,869	12.93	0	286,746	11.58	3	3	0
Liberal Democrats	271,049	10.96	1	215,682	8.71	1	2	0
Reform UK	183,361	7.41	0	145,409	5.87	1	1	+1
Rejoin EU				62,528	2.52	0	0	0
Animal Welfare				41,303	1.67	0	0	0
Britain First				32,085	1.30	0	0	New
Christian Peoples Alliance				26,798	1.08	0	0	0
Social Democratic				23,021	0.93	0	0	0
Laurence Fox				13,795	0.56	0	0	New
Farah London				13,048	0.53	0	0	New
Communist Party of Britain				10,915	0.44	0	0	0
Heritage				4,431	0.18	0	0	0
Gabe Romualdo				1,601	0.06	0	0	New
TUSC	15,216	0.62	0				0	0
Socialist	3,721	0.15	0				0	New
Independent	24,087	0.97	0				0	0
Total	2,473,555	100.00	14	2,476,687	100.00	11	25	0
Valid votes	2,473,555	99.20		2,476,687	99.31			
Invalid/blank votes	19,878	0.80		17,226	0.69			
Total votes	2,493,433	100.00		2,493,913	100.00			
Registered voters/turnout	6,162,428	40.46		6,162,428	40.47			

== Aftermath ==
Three days after the election, Siân Berry resigned from the Assembly so that Zoë Garbett could take her place instead.
