= 2014 Richmond upon Thames London Borough Council election =

2014 local election in England

Map of the results of the 2014 Richmond upon Thames Council election. Conservatives in blue and Liberal Democrats in yellow.

The 2014 Elections for Richmond upon Thames London Borough Council were held on 22 May 2014. Elections to the European Parliament took place on the same day.

In London council elections the entire council is elected every four years.

== Results ==
Richmond upon Thames Council election result 2014
Party	Seats	Gains	Losses	Net gain/loss	Seats %	Votes %	Votes	+/−
Conservative	39	11	1	+10	72.2	45.0	80,180	+3.3
Liberal Democrats	15	1	10	-9	27.8	31.8	56,689	-8.4
Labour	0	0	0	0	0.0	12.5	22,298	+3.1
Green	0	0	0	0	0.0	6.0	10,685	+0.3
UKIP	0	0	1	-1	0.0	3.9	6,930	+3.7
Independent	0	0	0	0	0.0	0.9	1,599	

== Ward results ==
=== Barnes ===
Barnes
Party	Candidate	Votes	%	±%
Conservative	Rita Palmer	1,852	58.37	+3.49
Conservative	Paul Hodgins	1,844	58.12	+4.06
Conservative	Christine Percival	1,840	57.99	+5.37
Liberal Democrats	Merlene Emerson	654	20.61	−13.74
Liberal Democrats	Carolyn Rampton	617	19.45	−12.90
Liberal Democrats	John Howell	574	18.09	−14.18
Green	Matthew Ridley	484	15.25	N/A
Labour	Frank Cooper	406	12.80	+4.49
Labour	Su Patel	373	11.76	+3.00
Labour	David Graystone	315	9.93	+1.82
Turnout				
Conservative hold		Swing		
Conservative hold		Swing		
Conservative hold		Swing		

=== East Sheen ===
East Sheen
Party	Candidate	Votes	%	±%
Conservative	Nicholas True	2,159	59.56	+4.27
Conservative	Brian Marcel	2,128	58.70	+7.71
Conservative	Robert Thompson	1,995	55.03	+4.10
Liberal Democrats	Timothy Catchpole	790	21.79	−12.67
Liberal Democrats	Nicola Macbean	725	20.00	−11.53
Liberal Democrats	Helena Lang	586	16.17	−13.97
Green	Simon Hegarty	561	15.48	+3.26
Labour	David Miles	410	11.31	+4.21
Labour	Elisabeth Turner-Morris	404	11.14	+5.36
Labour	Mike Freedman	393	10.84	+5.34
Turnout				
Conservative hold		Swing		
Conservative hold		Swing		
Conservative hold		Swing		

=== Fulwell & Hampton Hill ===
Fulwell & Hampton Hill
Party	Candidate	Votes	%	±%
Liberal Democrats	Jonathan Cardy	1,328	38.84	−9.16
Liberal Democrats	Jerry Elloy	1,282	37.50	−7.85
Conservative	Mark Boyle	1,260	36.85	+2.01
Conservative	Joe Broughton	1,171	34.25	+2.39
Liberal Democrats	Dan Sear	1,142	33.40	−13.86
Conservative	Dabbie Hollis	1,119	32.73	+1.31
Green	Monica Saunders	555	16.23	+2.61
Green	Sally Gray	481	14.07	N/A
Labour	Sandra Roberts	439	12.84	+2.87
Green	Daniel Dollin	411	12.02	N/A
Labour	Graham Nixon	383	11.20	+1.34
Labour	Jenifer Wyatt	366	10.70	+2.12
Turnout				
Liberal Democrats hold		Swing		
Liberal Democrats hold		Swing		
Conservative gain from Liberal Democrats		Swing		

=== Ham, Petersham & Richmond Riverside ===
Ham, Petersham & Richmond Riverside
Party	Candidate	Votes	%	±%
Liberal Democrats	Penelope Frost	1,341	37.26	−10.21
Conservative	Jean Loveland	1,319	36.65	−1.69
Conservative	Sarah Tippet	1,316	36.57	−1.89
Liberal Democrats	David Williams	1,299	36.09	−4.62
Liberal Democrats	Brian Miller	1,266	35.18	−6.44
Conservative	Seamus Joyce	1,208	33.56	−6.97
Green	Andrée Frieze	420	11.67	+0.59
Labour	Sandra Keen	401	11.14	+3.06
UKIP	David Sparrow	342	9.50	+5.10
Labour	Chris Fawcett	326	9.06	+2.62
UKIP	Sam Naz	316	8.78	N/A
UKIP	Teresa Vanneck-Surplice	300	8.34	N/A
Labour	Laura Rollin	284	7.89	+2.02
Turnout				
Liberal Democrats hold		Swing		
Conservative gain from Liberal Democrats		Swing		
Conservative gain from Liberal Democrats		Swing		

=== Hampton ===
Hampton
Party	Candidate	Votes	%	±%
Liberal Democrats	Gareth Roberts	1,578	42.61	−5.55
Liberal Democrats	Suzette Nicholson	1,570	42.40	−6.77
Conservative	Petra Sale	1,341	36.21	−3.19
Conservative	Mark Davies	1,244	33.59	−4.99
Liberal Democrats	Nuriyeh Popalzi	1,241	33.51	−14.93
Conservative	Nathaniel Ikeazor	1,157	31.24	−6.39
Green	Felix Wood	519	14.02	N/A
UKIP	Alex Corner	512	13.83	N/A
Labour	Margaret Mills	394	10.64	+2.11
Labour	Donald Makepeace	387	10.45	+2.59
Labour	Howard Roberts	319	8.61	+1.78
Turnout				
Liberal Democrats hold		Swing		
Liberal Democrats hold		Swing		
Conservative gain from Liberal Democrats		Swing		

=== Hampton North ===
Hampton North
Party	Candidate	Votes	%	±%
Conservative	Geoffrey Samuel	1,390	44.69	+3.42
Conservative	Kate Howard	1,313	42.22	+2.10
Conservative	Martin Seymour	1,280	41.16	+0.77
Liberal Democrats	Ellen Day	756	24.31	−18.94
Liberal Democrats	Darren Thornton	700	22.51	−18.02
Liberal Democrats	Avril Coelho	686	22.06	−18.33
UKIP	Michael Mackie	416	13.38	N/A
UKIP	Michael Maloney	397	12.77	N/A
UKIP	Paul Rodwell	396	12.73	N/A
Labour	Louisa Spawls	379	12.19	+3.10
Labour	Jane Butters	372	11.96	+1.09
Green	Catherine von Ruhland	342	11.00	+6.23
Labour	John Thrower	334	10.74	+2.08
Turnout				
Conservative gain from Liberal Democrats		Swing		
Conservative hold		Swing		
Conservative gain from Liberal Democrats		Swing		

=== Hampton Wick ===
Hampton Wick
Party	Candidate	Votes	%	±%
Conservative	Tony Arbour	1,870	55.75	+7.08
Conservative	Tania Mathias	1,708	50.92	+9.05
Conservative	Gareth Evans	1,586	47.29	+4.98
Green	Michael Bangham	696	20.75	+5.60
Liberal Democrats	James Chard	676	20.16	−15.49
Liberal Democrats	Chris Gee	647	19.29	−15.49
Liberal Democrats	Mark Goodrich	593	17.68	−12.80
Labour	Caroline Loewenstein	522	15.56	+6.48
Labour	Gerard Ward	520	15.50	+4.75
Labour	Sheila Nixon	474	14.13	+5.75
Turnout				
Conservative hold		Swing		
Conservative hold		Swing		
Conservative hold		Swing		

=== Heathfield ===
Heathfield
Party	Candidate	Votes	%	±%
Liberal Democrats	John Coombs	1,147	33.42	−13.15
Conservative	Alan Butler	1,126	32.81	−2.95
Conservative	Annie Hambridge	1,088	31.70	−4.00
Liberal Democrats	Rosy Cobb	1,019	29.69	−11.90
Liberal Democrats	Michael Wilson	935	27.24	−7.88
Conservative	Saba Shaukat	933	27.19	−4.80
Labour	Rhonda Evans	755	22.00	+6.92
Labour	Robert Newbery	717	20.89	+5.83
UKIP	Andrew Christie	653	19.03	N/A
Labour	Craig Owen	609	17.74	+3.96
Green	Stephen Smith	311	9.06	N/A
Turnout				
Liberal Democrats hold		Swing		
Conservative gain from Liberal Democrats		Swing		
Conservative hold		Swing		

=== Kew ===
Kew
Party	Candidate	Votes	%	±%
Conservative	Meena Bond	2,101	49.45	+3.84
Conservative	David Linnette	1,983	46.67	+3.34
Conservative	Monica Horner	1,902	44.76	+2.79
Liberal Democrats	J-F Burford	1,601	37.68	−6.48
Liberal Democrats	Catrine Mogilner	1,404	33.04	−10.19
Liberal Democrats	Leon Sosnowski	1,223	28.78	−13.67
Green	Andrew Webster	552	12.99	N/A
Labour	Gareth James	348	8.19	+0.67
Labour	Pamela Leons-Marder	338	7.95	−0.51
Labour	Tony Eades	337	7.93	+0.32
Independent	Jane Harrison	221	5.20	N/A
Turnout				
Conservative hold		Swing		
Conservative gain from Liberal Democrats		Swing		
Conservative hold		Swing		

=== Mortlake & Barnes Common ===
Mortlake & Barnes Common
Party	Candidate	Votes	%	±%
Conservative	Gemma Curran	1,844	49.93	+4.38
Conservative	Paul Avon	1,809	48.98	+1.33
Conservative	Richard Martin	1,630	44.14	+0.82
Liberal Democrats	Michael Dingemans	907	24.56	−14.29
Liberal Democrats	Hong Ling Dyer	856	23.18	−10.61
Liberal Democrats	Anton McNulty-Howard	665	18.01	−11.47
Green	James Page	500	13.54	+1.45
Independent	Simon Danciger	454	12.29	+2.82
Green	Steph Aldridge	436	11.81	N/A
Labour	Leonard Griffiths	386	10.45	+2.51
Labour	Ayar Ata	383	10.37	+2.38
Labour	Derek Somers	326	8.83	+1.65
Green	Anthony Breslin	275	7.45	N/A
Turnout				
Conservative hold		Swing		
Conservative hold		Swing		
Conservative hold		Swing		

=== North Richmond ===
North Richmond
Party	Candidate	Votes	%	±%
Conservative	Lisa Blakemore	1,632	45.21	−1.13
Conservative	Margaret Butler	1,593	44.13	−0.56
Conservative	Stephen Speak	1,515	41.02	−1.98
Liberal Democrats	Emily Ward	1,086	29.41	−13.25
Liberal Democrats	Rosina Robson	1,080	29.24	−13.07
Liberal Democrats	Richard Pyne	1,057	28.62	−11.41
Green	Tanya Williams	484	13.11	N/A
Labour	Barnaby Marder	386	10.45	+0.37
Labour	Pamela Risner	383	10.37	+1.82
Labour	Anthony Jaimongal	380	10.29	+1.97
UKIP	Raymond Perrin	295	7.99	N/A
UKIP	Jack Sosnierz	250	6.77	N/A
Turnout				
Conservative hold		Swing		
Conservative hold		Swing		
Conservative hold		Swing		

=== South Richmond ===
South Richmond
Party	Candidate	Votes	%	±%
Conservative	Pamela Fleming	1,866	54.90	+2.63
Conservative	Peter Buckwell	1,793	52.75	−0.15
Conservative	Thomas O'Malley	1,665	48.98	−0.57
Liberal Democrats	Serena Hennessy	788	23.18	−13.37
Liberal Democrats	Susan Lloyd	684	20.12	−15.34
Liberal Democrats	Andrew Pilkington	581	17.09	−18.07
Green	Elizabeth Nash	564	16.59	N/A
Labour	Brian Caton	408	12.00	+4.33
Labour	Matthew Horrocks	400	11.77	+2.37
Labour	Sachin Patel	321	9.44	+2.19
UKIP	Robert Leon	283	8.33	N/A
Turnout				
Conservative hold		Swing		
Conservative hold		Swing		
Conservative hold		Swing		

=== South Twickenham ===
South Twickenham
Party	Candidate	Votes	%	±%
Conservative	Clare Head	1,621	48.09	+5.43
Conservative	David Porter	1,551	46.01	+3.42
Conservative	David Marlow	1,480	43.90	+3.95
Liberal Democrats	Dawny Christien	918	27.23	−9.94
Liberal Democrats	Michael Butlin	914	27.11	−9.85
Liberal Democrats	York Membery	767	22.75	−12.44
Green	Diana Locke	652	19.34	+6.69
Labour	James Carpenter	521	15.46	+5.70
Labour	Beatriz McGawn Lees	504	14.95	+7.57
Labour	Stephen Guichard	502	14.89	+4.53
Turnout				
Conservative hold		Swing		
Conservative hold		Swing		
Conservative hold		Swing		

=== St Margarets & North Twickenham ===
St Margarets & North Twickenham
Party	Candidate	Votes	%	±%
Liberal Democrats	Geoff Acton	1,729	44.20	+2.08
Liberal Democrats	Ben Khosa	1,564	39.98	+1.88
Liberal Democrats	Alexander Ehmann	1,469	37.55	+0.41
Conservative	Suzanne Healy	1,413	36.12	−0.58
Conservative	Chris Harrison	1,384	35.38	−2.50
Conservative	Luke Parker	1,165	29.78	−4.32
Green	Jack Munro	637	16.28	+5.71
Labour	Penelope Banaji	466	11.91	+3.71
Labour	Anthony Nieper	409	10.46	+3.08
UKIP	Martyn Ferguson-Jones	353	9.02	N/A
Labour	Derek Tutchell	316	8.08	+2.35
Turnout				
Liberal Democrats hold		Swing		
Liberal Democrats hold		Swing		
Liberal Democrats gain from Conservative		Swing		

=== Teddington ===
Teddington
Party	Candidate	Votes	%	±%
Liberal Democrats	Jennifer Churchill	1,587	42.01	−6.00
Liberal Democrats	Martin Elengorn	1,514	40.07	−5.87
Liberal Democrats	Stephen Knight	1,497	39.62	−5.90
Conservative	Elizabeth Foster	1,447	38.30	+0.66
Conservative	Jon Hollis	1,356	35.89	−1.54
Conservative	Simon Lamb	1,296	34.30	−5.10
Green	Mark Sanders-Barwick	512	13.55	N/A
Labour	Cheryl Ould	425	11.25	+0.64
Labour	Michelle Sims	414	10.96	+1.46
Labour	Eva Tutchell	385	10.19	+1.82
UKIP	Dominic Stockford	308	8.15	N/A
Turnout				
Liberal Democrats hold		Swing		
Liberal Democrats hold		Swing		
Liberal Democrats hold		Swing		

=== Twickenham Riverside ===
Twickenham Riverside
Party	Candidate	Votes	%	±%
Conservative	Susan Chappell	1,485	42.88	−1.85
Conservative	Benedict Dias	1,293	37.38	−4.13
Conservative	Helen Hill	1,267	36.59	−4.70
Liberal Democrats	Susan Burningham	1,187	34.28	−5.62
Liberal Democrats	Sue Howes	1,142	32.98	−2.27
Liberal Democrats	Roger Crouch	1,027	29.66	−3.22
Green	Anne Page	544	15.71	+0.54
Labour	Deborah Lane	378	10.92	−0.76
Labour	Adam Gladstone	375	10.83	+0.29
Labour	David Harley	355	10.25	+1.84
UKIP	Scott Naylor	293	8.46	N/A
UKIP	Sarah Meagher	254	7.33	N/A
UKIP	Barry Edwards	235	6.79	N/A
Turnout				
Conservative hold		Swing		
Conservative hold		Swing		
Conservative hold		Swing		

=== West Twickenham ===
West Twickenham
Party	Candidate	Votes	%	±%
Liberal Democrats	Piers Allen	1,249	36.59	−10.56
Liberal Democrats	Helen Lee-Parsons	1,209	35.14	−11.35
Conservative	Jane Boulton	1,133	33.19	−4.86
Conservative	Reuben Fevrier	1,105	32.37	−5.21
Liberal Democrats	Lesley Pollesche	1,030	30.17	−10.83
Conservative	Graham Woolnough	966	28.30	−6.60
Labour	Neil Browning	520	15.23	+3.20
Green	Lisa Howard	482	14.12	N/A
Labour	Paul Tanto	474	13.88	+2.32
Labour	Peter McCabe	446	13.06	+2.25
UKIP	Richard Lailey	405	11.86	N/A
UKIP	Jamie Moodie	367	10.75	N/A
Turnout				
Liberal Democrats hold		Swing		
Liberal Democrats hold		Swing		
Conservative gain from Liberal Democrats		Swing		

=== Whitton ===
Whitton
Party	Candidate	Votes	%	±%
Conservative	Gareth Elliott	1,427	40.88	+5.49
Conservative	Grant Healy	1,129	32.34	+1.37
Liberal Democrats	Liz Jaeger	1,104	31.62	−7.10
Conservative	Marc Hope	1,082	30.99	+1.63
Liberal Democrats	Alan Juriansz	902	25.84	−14.27
Liberal Democrats	Steven Topol	796	22.80	−11.04
UKIP	Douglas Orchard	555	15.90	N/A
Independent	Paul Hampartsoumian	469	13.43	N/A
Independent	Neil Wilton	455	13.03	−0.28
Labour	Alan Barber	425	12.17	+1.34
Labour	Stephen Batey	390	11.17	+1.04
Labour	Sampson Low	315	9.02	−0.49
Green	Rustam Majainah	267	7.65	N/A
Turnout				
Conservative hold		Swing		
Conservative gain from Liberal Democrats		Swing		
Liberal Democrats hold		Swing		
