= Aphra Brandreth =

British politician

Aphra Brandreth MP
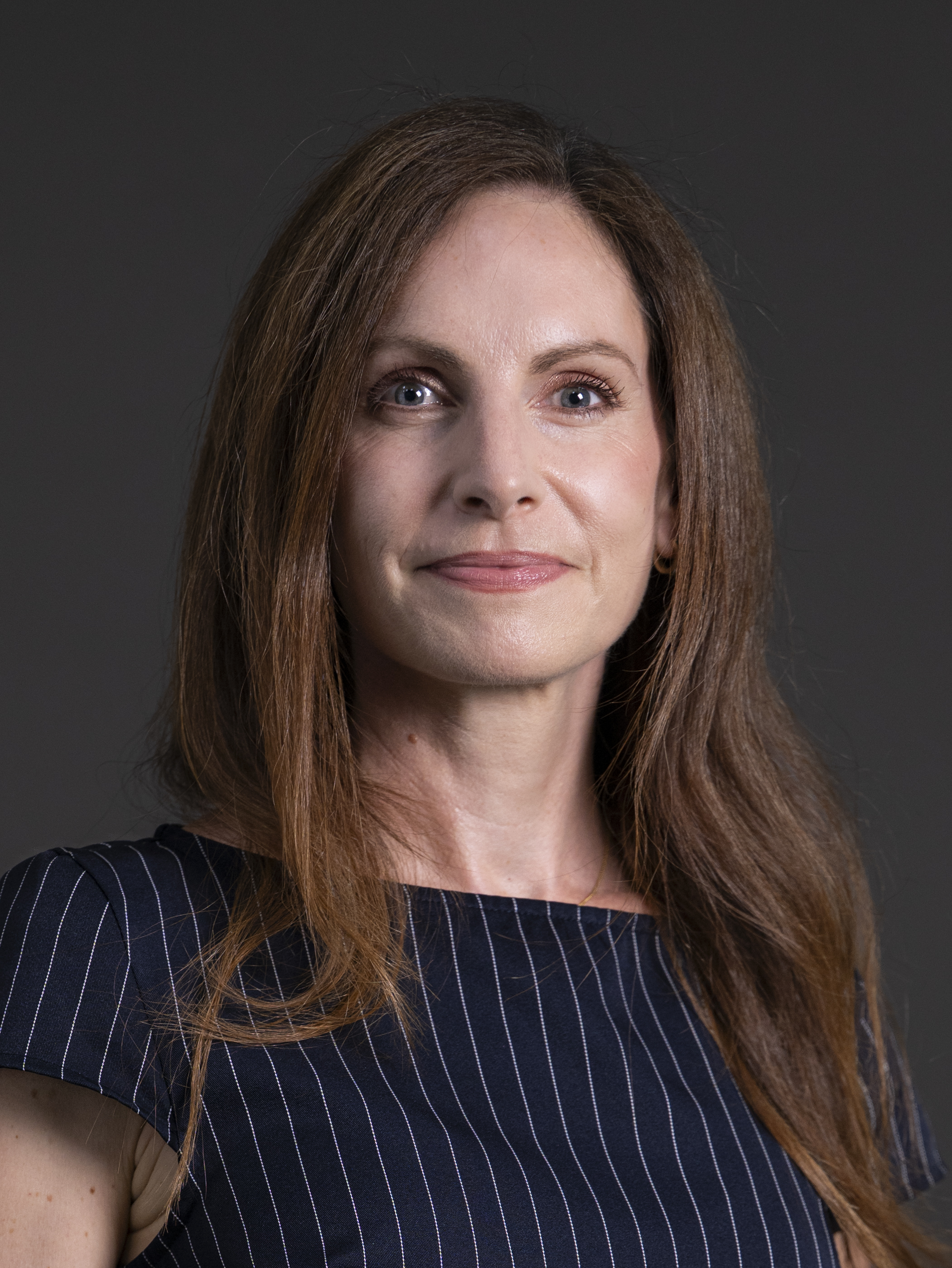
- Official portrait, 2026

Shadow Parliamentary Under-Secretary of State for Environment, Food and Rural Affairs
- Incumbent
- Assumed office 31 August 2026
- Leader: Kemi Badenoch

Member of Parliament for Chester South and Eddisbury
- Incumbent
- Assumed office 4 July 2024
- Preceded by: Constituency established
- Majority: 3,057 (5.8%)

Personal details
- Born: Aphra Kendal Alice Brandreth; 18 July 1978 (age 48) Fitzrovia, London, England
- Party: Conservative
- Spouse: Ian Stroud (m. 2006)
- Children: 3
- Parent: Gyles Brandreth
- Education: Godolphin and Latymer School; University College London (BSc)
- Website: www.aphrabrandreth.com

Aphra Kendal Alice Brandreth (born 18 July 1978) is a British Conservative Party politician who has served as the Member of Parliament (MP) for Chester South and Eddisbury since the 2024 general election.

== Early life and education ==
Brandreth was born in Middlesex Hospital on 18 July 1978. Her father is the broadcaster Gyles Brandreth, who was Conservative MP for City of Chester from 1992 to 1997.

She attended Godolphin and Latymer School and studied economics at University College London. From 2003 to 2013 she was an economic adviser to Defra.

== Local political career ==
Brandreth was elected as a Conservative councillor for the Barnes ward of the Richmond Council in 2018 and became the deputy leader of the Conservative group. She lost her seat in 2022 to the Liberal Democrats.

== Parliamentary career ==
Brandreth was the Conservative candidate for Kingston and Surbiton at the 2019 general election, coming second to Ed Davey, then deputy leader of the Liberal Democrats.

She was elected to the seat of Chester South and Eddisbury in the 2024 general election, a new constituency including part of her father's former seat, City of Chester. She made her maiden speech on 24 July.

== Personal life ==
Brandreth is married to Ian Stroud; they have three children.

== Elections contested ==
General election 2019: Kingston and Surbiton
| Party | Candidate | Votes | % | ±% |
|---|---|---|---|---|
| Liberal Democrats | Ed Davey | 31,103 | 51.1 | +6.4 |
| Conservative | Aphra Brandreth | 20,614 | 33.9 | −4.2 |
| Labour | Leanne Werner | 6,528 | 10.7 | −4.1 |
| Green | Sharron Sumner | 1,038 | 1.7 | +0.8 |
| Brexit Party | Scott Holman | 788 | 1.3 | New |
| Majority | | 10,489 | 17.2 | +10.6 |
| Turnout | | 60,846 | 74.2 | −2.0 |
| Registered electors | | 81,975 | | |
| Liberal Democrats hold | | Swing | +5.3 | |

General election 2024: Chester South and Eddisbury
| Party | Candidate | Votes | % | ±% |
|---|---|---|---|---|
| Conservative | Aphra Brandreth | 19,905 | 37.9 | −21.3 |
| Labour | Angeliki Stogia | 16,848 | 32.1 | +10.6 |
| Reform | Peter Langley | 6,414 | 12.2 | +11.2 |
| Liberal Democrats | Rob Herd | 5,430 | 10.3 | −5.0 |
| Green | Steve Davies | 2,278 | 4.3 | +2.2 |
| Independent | Gillian Edwards | 1,611 | 3.1 | N/A |
| Majority | | 3,057 | 5.8 | −31.9 |
| Turnout | | 52,486 | 70.7 | –6.0 |
| Registered electors | | 74,284 | | |
| Conservative hold | | Swing | −15.9 | |
