= Hampton (ward) =

Electoral ward in London, England

- Electoral ward for the Richmond upon Thames London Borough Council
- Borough: Richmond upon Thames
- County: Greater London
- Population: 10,274 (2021)
- Major settlements: Hampton, London
- Area: 6.880 km²

Current electoral ward
- Created: 1965
- Seats: 3

Hampton is an electoral ward in the London Borough of Richmond upon Thames. The ward was first used in the 1964 elections and elects three councillors to Richmond upon Thames London Borough Council.

== Geography ==
The ward is named after the district of Hampton.

== Councillors ==
Election	Councillors		
2022	Gareth Roberts (Liberal Democrats)	Suzette Nicholson (Liberal Democrats)	Sam Dalton (Liberal Democrats)
2026	Gareth Roberts (Liberal Democrats)	Sam Dalton (Liberal Democrats)	Nick Kennerley (Liberal Democrats)

== Elections ==
=== 2026 ===
Hampton
Party	Candidate	Votes	%	±%
Liberal Democrats	Gareth Roberts*	2,117	53.1	−10.0
Liberal Democrats	Sam Dalton*	2,087	52.3	−9.5
Liberal Democrats	Nick Kennerley	1,967	49.3	−12.8
Conservative	Veronica Barnes	946	23.7	−4.7
Conservative	Derek Jones	915	22.9	−4.8
Conservative	Rody Mager	704	17.6	−9.7
Green	Valentina Butenko	544	13.6	N/A
Reform	Debbie Montague	468	11.7	N/A
Reform	Stuart Wright	447	11.2	N/A
Green	Meera Rajendran	436	10.9	N/A
Green	Lewis Sturdy	410	10.3	N/A
Labour	Caroline Loewenstein	144	3.6	−4.3
Labour	Christopher Fawcett	131	3.3	−3.8
Labour	James Oliva-Hauxwell	109	2.7	−4.3
Turnout		3,990	53.54	+3.8
Registered electors		7,453		
Liberal Democrats hold		Swing		
Liberal Democrats hold		Swing		
Liberal Democrats hold		Swing		

=== 2022 ===
Hampton
Party	Candidate	Votes	%	±%
Liberal Democrats	Gareth Roberts*	2,290	63.1	
Liberal Democrats	Suzette Nicholson*	2,253	62.1	
Liberal Democrats	Sam Dalton	2,242	61.8	
Conservative	Jon Slinn	1,030	28.4	
Conservative	Nina Watson	1,004	27.7	
Conservative	Petra Sale	991	27.3	
Labour	Roisin Gadd	285	7.9	
Labour	Derek Gadd	257	7.1	
Labour	Stephen Guichard	255	7.0	
Turnout		3,627	49.6	
Liberal Democrats hold		Swing		
Liberal Democrats hold		Swing		
Liberal Democrats hold		Swing		

== See also ==
- List of electoral wards in Greater London
