= Nicholas Rogers (politician) =

British politician

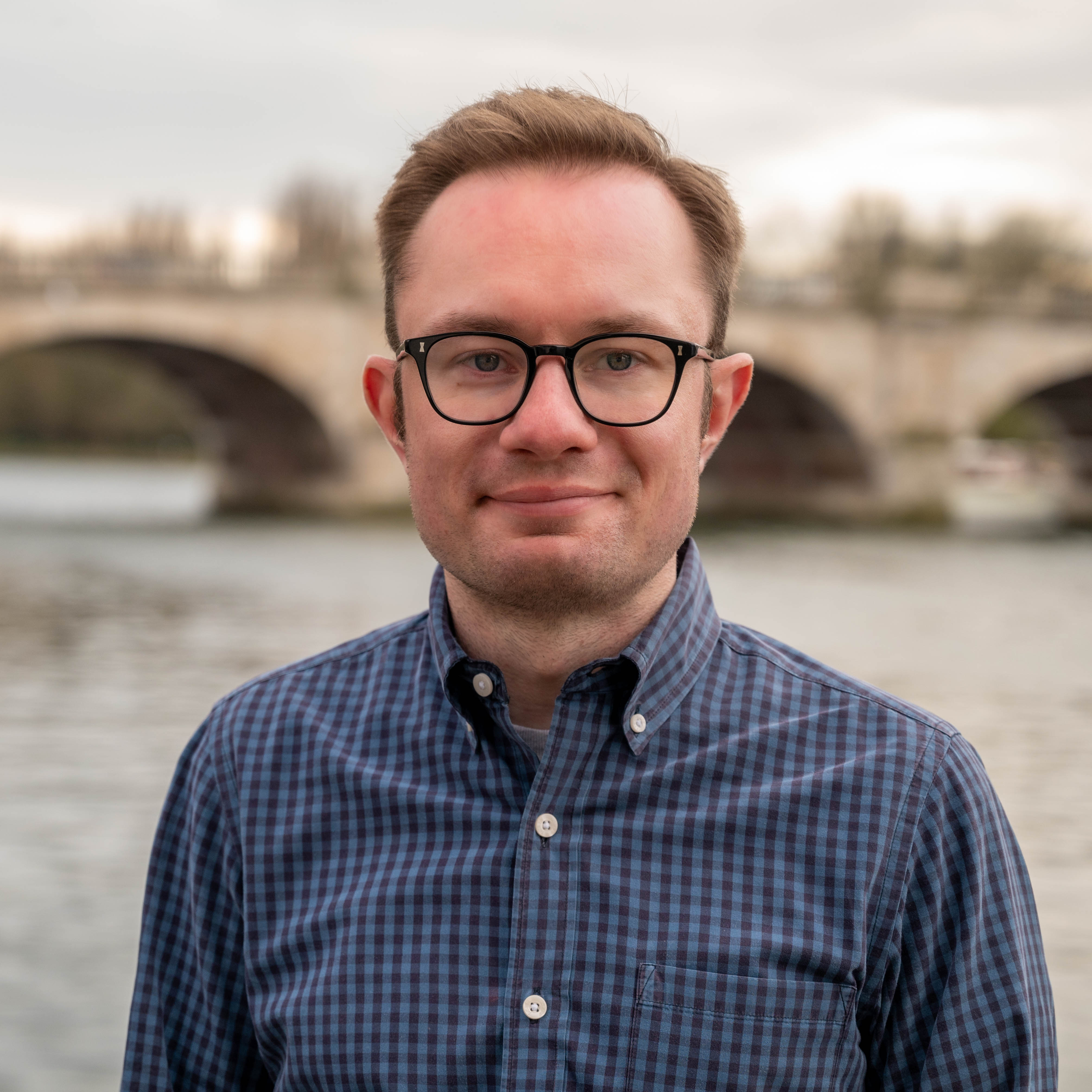

Member of the London Assembly for South West
- In office 6 May 2021 – 6 May 2024
- Preceded by: Tony Arbour
- Succeeded by: Gareth Roberts

Personal details
- Born: Nicholas James Rogers; 19 August 1985 (age 41) Royal Tunbridge Wells, Kent, England
- Party: Conservative
- Domestic partner: Liam Rogers

Nicholas James Rogers (born 19 August 1985) is a former British Conservative Party politician who was the Member of the London Assembly (AM) for South West from 2021 until 2024.

== Early life and education ==
Rogers was born in 1985, the son of Neil Rogers and Fiona Dunn. He received a degree in management from Royal Holloway, University of London.

== Career ==
In 2007, Rogers joined Transport for London as a graduate and spent 18 months as a manager at Waterloo Station. He is also a former special constable in the Metropolitan Police.

Since 2015, he has been an incident controller at Network Rail. From 2016 to 2020, he was a director of TEDxKingstonUponThames.

In a 2024 talk given at TEDxKingstonUponThames, Rogers discussed his lifelong interest in airships and their potential return to commercial use. Later that year, he set up a podcast focused on airship history.

== Political career ==
In 2010, Rogers ran to be a Conservative Councillor in Lambeth for Knight's Hill ward.

He was elected as a Conservative to Tunbridge Wells Borough Council in 2011 and served as a councillor for the Culverden ward until 2015.

He was elected to the London Assembly representing South West London in the 2021 London Assembly election.

In March 2023, he put forward a motion for a new permanent statue of the late Queen Elizabeth ll to be placed in a London location. The motion was passed by the London Assembly.

In May 2023, he became Chair of the London Assembly's Transport Committee.

In June 2023, he announced his plans to step down at the next Assembly election. In a Spectator article published after the 2024 London Assembly and Mayoral elections, Rogers noted he was no longer a member of the Conservative Party.

== Personal life ==
Rogers entered into a marriage in 2011 with his partner Liam. Outside politics, his interests are airships, jazz, architecture, history and cats.

In October 2024 he announced he had been diagnosed with bowel cancer. He received successful treatment later that year.
