= Richmond upon Thames London Borough Council =

Local authority for the London Borough of Richmond upon Thames

- Coat of arms

- Council logo

Type
- Type: London borough council of the London Borough of Richmond upon Thames
- Houses: Unicameral

Leadership
- Mayor: Nancy Baldwin, Liberal Democrat since 19 May 2026
- Leader: Gareth Roberts, Liberal Democrat since 22 May 2018
- Chief Executive: Ana Popovici since July 2026

Structure
- Seats: 54 councillors
- Political groups: Administration (54) Liberal Democrat (54)
- Length of term: Whole council elected every four years

Elections
- Voting system: Plurality at-large (FPTP)
- Last election: 7 May 2026
- Next election: 2 May 2030

Meeting place
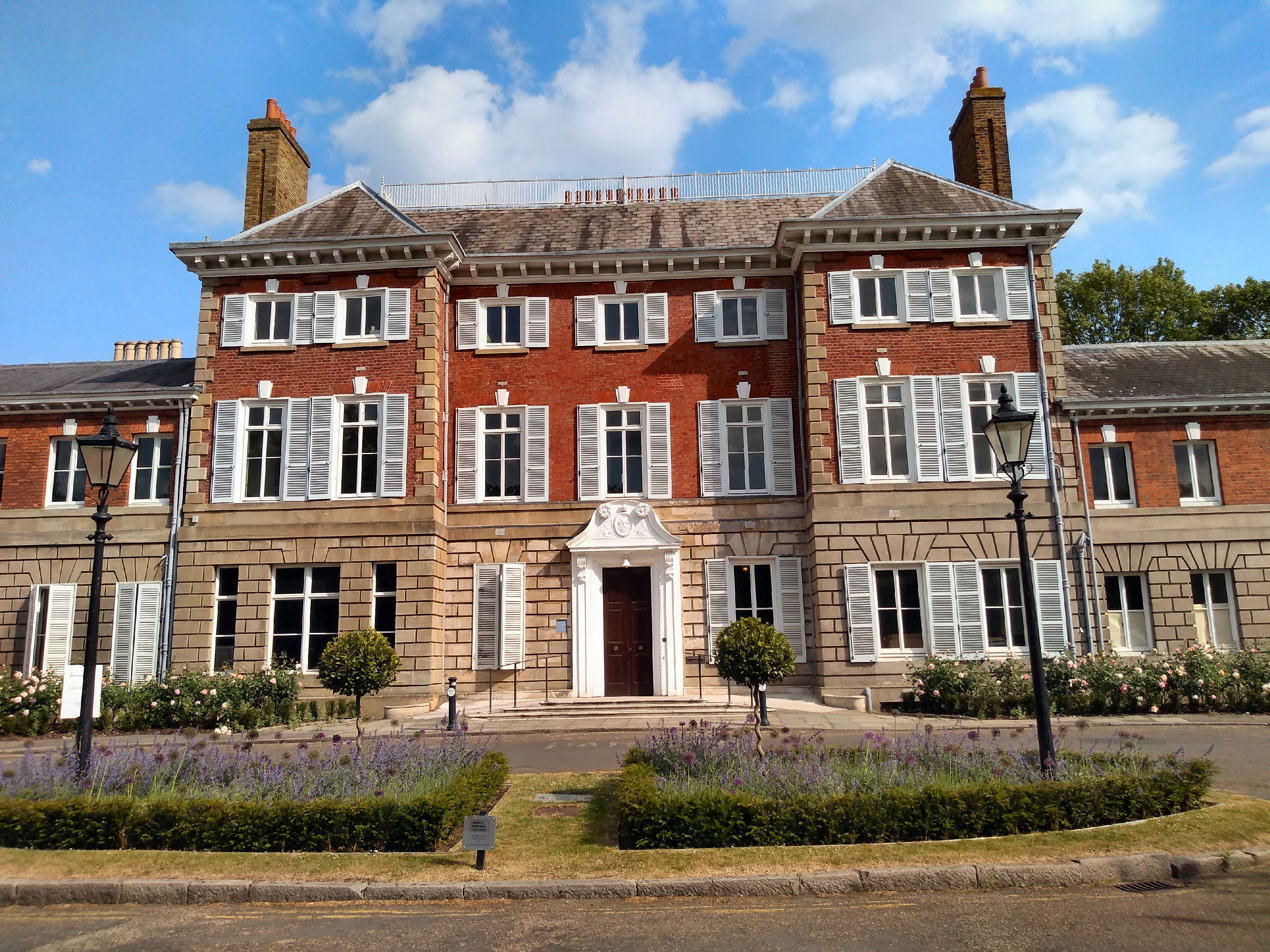
- York House, Richmond Road, Twickenham, TW1 3AA

Website
- www.richmond.gov.uk

Richmond upon Thames London Borough Council, also known as Richmond upon Thames Council, LBRUT or Richmond Council, is the local authority for the London Borough of Richmond upon Thames in Greater London, England. The council, which has been under Liberal Democrat majority control since 2018, is responsible for providing certain services within the borough. Although the borough is named after Richmond, the council meets in Twickenham, at York House, and has its main offices in the adjoining Civic Centre.

== History ==
The London Borough of Richmond upon Thames and its council, whose full legal name is the Mayor and Burgesses of the London Borough of Richmond upon Thames, were created under the London Government Act 1963, with the first election being held in 1964. For its first year the council acted as a shadow authority alongside the area's three outgoing authorities, the municipal borough councils of Barnes, Richmond, and Twickenham. The new council formally came into its powers on 1 April 1965, at which point the old boroughs and their councils were abolished.

From 1965 until 1986 the council was a lower-tier authority, with upper-tier functions provided by the Greater London Council. The split of powers and functions meant that the Greater London Council was responsible for "wide area" services such as fire, ambulance, flood prevention, and refuse disposal; with the boroughs (including Richmond upon Thames) responsible for "personal" services such as social care, libraries, cemeteries and refuse collection. As an outer London borough council Richmond upon Thames has been a local education authority since 1965. The Greater London Council was abolished in 1986 and its functions passed to the London boroughs, with some services provided through joint committees.

Since 2000 the Greater London Authority has taken some responsibility for highways and planning control from the council, but within the English local government system the council remains a "most purpose" authority in terms of the available range of powers and functions.

Since 2016 the council has shared a chief executive and other staff with neighbouring Wandsworth Council.

== Powers and functions ==
The local authority derives its powers and functions from the London Government Act 1963 and subsequent legislation, and has the powers and functions of a London borough council. It sets council tax and as a billing authority it also collects precepts for Greater London Authority functions and business rates. It sets planning policies which complement Greater London Authority and national policies, and decides on almost all planning applications accordingly. It is also the local education authority.

== Political composition ==
The council has been under Liberal Democrat majority control since 2018. Political control of the council since 1965 has been as follows:

Party in control	Years
Conservative	1965–1982
No overall control	1982–1983
Alliance	1983–1988
Liberal Democrats	1988–2002
Conservative	2002–2006
Liberal Democrats	2006–2010
Conservative	2010–2018
Liberal Democrats	2018–present

=== Leadership ===
The role of mayor is largely ceremonial in Richmond. Political leadership is instead provided by the leader of the council. The leaders since 1965 have been:

Councillor	Party	From	To
Harry Hall	Conservative	1964	May 1978
John Baker	Conservative	8 May 1978	1980
Keith Morell	Conservative	1980	May 1983
David Williams	Liberal	May 1983	3 March 1988
David Williams	Liberal Democrats	3 March 1988	May 2001
Serge Lourie	Liberal Democrats	22 May 2001	May 2002
Tony Arbour	Conservative	13 May 2002	May 2006
Serge Lourie	Liberal Democrats	16 May 2006	May 2010
Nicholas True, Baron True	Conservative	25 May 2010	4 July 2017
Paul Hodgins	Conservative	4 July 2017	May 2018
Gareth Roberts	Liberal Democrats	22 May 2018	

=== Composition ===
Following the 2026 election, the composition of the council was:

Party	Councillors
Liberal Democrats	54
Total	54

The next election is due in May 2030.

== Wards ==
Richmond upon Thames has 18 wards, each of which returns three councillors: Barnes; East Sheen; Fulwell & Hampton Hill; Ham, Petersham & Richmond Riverside; Hampton; Hampton North; Hampton Wick & South Teddington; Heathfield; Kew; Mortlake & Barnes Common; North Richmond; South Richmond; South Twickenham; St Margarets & North Twickenham; Teddington; Twickenham Riverside; West Twickenham; and Whitton.

== Elections ==
Since the last boundary changes in 2022, the council has comprised 54 councillors representing 18 wards, with each ward electing three councillors. Elections are held every four years.

== Premises ==
The council meets in the centre of Twickenham at York House, a large 17th-century house that was bought in 1923 by the old Twickenham Urban District Council (predecessor of Twickenham Borough Council) and converted to become its headquarters. In 1990 the council moved its main offices to a new purpose-built civic centre at 44 York Street, immediately west of York House. The civic centre was partly built behind the retained Victorian façade of a parade of shops at the corner of York Street and Church Street.

== Notable former councillors ==
- Tony Arbour, councillor for Hampton Wick ward 1968–1986 and 1994–2018, and Leader of the Council 2002–2006
- David Blomfield, councillor for Kew ward 1971–1978 and 1979–1986. As leader of the Liberal group he was Leader of the Opposition on the Council in 1978.
- Aphra Brandreth, councillor for Barnes ward 2018–2022
- Ian Dalziel, councillor for Barnes ward 1978–1979
- Jane Dodds, councillor for North Richmond ward 2006–2010 and, from 2008 to 2010, the Cabinet Member for Performance
- Dee Doocey, councillor for Hampton ward 1986–1994 and chair of the council's Housing Committee
- Sally Hamwee, councillor for Palewell ward 1978–1998
- Stephen Knight, councillor for Teddington ward 2006–2018 and Leader of the Opposition on the Council 2010–2015
- Serge Lourie, councillor for Kew ward 1982–2010; Leader of the Council 2001–2002 and 2006–2010
- Tania Mathias, councillor for Hampton Wick ward 2010–2015
- Bill Newton Dunn, councillor for South Richmond ward 2018–2022 and previously a Member of the European Parliament
- Geoff Pope, councillor for South Twickenham ward, mayor 1989–1990 and chair of the Council's Social Services Committee
- Tim Razzall, councillor for Mortlake ward 1974–1998. During that time he served as chair of the Council's Policy and Resources Committee for 13 years and as deputy leader 1983–1996. He was succeeded in both roles by Serge Lourie.
- Stanley Rundle who, at a 1966 by-election in Kew ward, won the Liberal Party's first seat on the council, and held it until 1968.
- Jenny Tonge, councillor for Kew ward 1981–1990 and chair of the Council's Social Services Committee
- Nicholas True, Lord True, councillor for East Sheen ward 1986–2017 and Leader of the Council 2010–2017
- Sir David Williams, councillor for Ham, Petersham and Richmond Riverside ward 1974–2014 and Leader of the Council 1983–2001

== See also ==
- London Borough of Richmond upon Thames for a list of people, including some former mayors, who have been granted freedom of the borough
