= Gareth Roberts (politician) =

English politician (born 1971)

Cllr Gareth Roberts AM
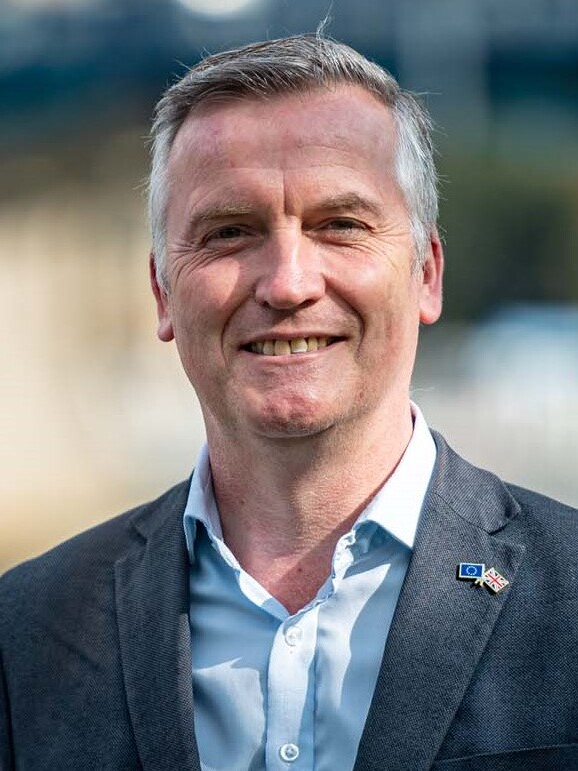
- Roberts in 2020

Leader of Richmond upon Thames London Borough Council
- Incumbent
- Assumed office 22 May 2018
- Preceded by: Paul Hodgins

Member of Richmond upon Thames London Borough Council for Hampton
- Incumbent
- Assumed office 6 May 2010

Member of the London Assembly for South West
- Incumbent
- Assumed office 6 May 2024
- Preceded by: Nicholas Rogers
- Majority: 16,019 (7.8%)

London Liberal Democrats Spokesperson on Police, Crime and the Environment on the London Assembly
- Incumbent
- Assumed office 9 May 2024
- Leader: Hina Bokhari

Personal details
- Born: 28 March 1971 (age 55)
- Party: Liberal Democrats
- Spouse: Petra Chantal Roberts
- Children: 3
- Education: St Mary's University, Twickenham
- Occupation: Market research
- Profession: Politician

Gareth David Roberts is a British Liberal Democrat politician, serving as the Member of the London Assembly (AM) for South West since 2024 and the leader of Richmond Upon Thames Council since 2018.

He currently serves as the London Liberal Democrats' spokesperson on Police and Crime, the Environment and the budget process on the London Assembly.

== Early life and education ==
Roberts was born in 1971, the son of Dave Roberts, a Labour city councillor in Derby. He graduated in classics from St Mary's University, Twickenham.

== Career ==
In 1994, he joined the market research firm Hauck before moving on to Sadek Wynberg Millward Brown in 2001, followed by Safari Research in 2003, where he rose to become the managing director. In 2018 he set up his own firm, Field Monkey.

== Political career ==
Roberts started his political career as a Conservative Party activist as a sixth-form student in Derby. In an interview, Roberts recalls how his staunch trade unionist father was absolutely livid.

He was first elected the councillor for Hampton ward in the London Borough of Richmond upon Thames in 2010. In May 2018, Roberts became the leader of Richmond Council.

Roberts was the candidate for the South West constituency at the 2021 London Assembly election, moving the Liberal Democrats from third into second place.

At the 2024 London Assembly election, Roberts was elected to represent the South West constituency, gaining the seat from the Conservatives, who were pushed into third place behind Labour. It was the first time the South West constituency has not been represented by the Conservatives since its creation in 2000 and also the first time any London Assembly constituency seat had been won by a party other than Labour or the Conservatives.
