= Stephen Knight (politician) =

British politician

Member of the London Assembly as an additional member
- In office 1 May 2012 – 5 May 2016
- Preceded by: Gareth Bacon
- Succeeded by: David Kurten

Councillor for Richmond upon Thames London Borough Council
- In office 4 May 2006 – 3 May 2018
- Ward: Teddington

Personal details
- Party: Liberal Democrats (2006–2018); Labour (2018–present)
- Occupation: Politician

Stephen Knight is a British Labour Party politician who was previously a member of the London Assembly for the Liberal Democrats.

== Political career ==
Knight was a councillor in Richmond upon Thames and a past leader of the Liberal Democrat group there. From 2006 to 2010, he served as Deputy Leader with responsibility for finance. He was largely responsible for the rebuilding of Teddington School under the Building Schools for the Future programme.

He was elected as a London-wide member of the London Assembly in 2012, but did not stand in 2016 after being demoted by party members from second place to fifth place on the Liberal Democrat candidate list.

He defected to the Labour Party in January 2018 and was not re-elected on 3 May 2018.

== Personal life ==
His partner, Jennifer Churchill, was a Labour councillor in Richmond upon Thames after defecting from the Liberal Democrats in 2015. She failed to be re-elected in May 2018 when she stood in West Twickenham, finishing behind Liberal Democrat and Conservative candidates.
