= Twickenham by-election =

Twickenham by-election may refer to one of four by-elections held for the British House of Commons constituency of Twickenham:

- 1929 Twickenham by-election
- 1932 Twickenham by-election
- 1934 Twickenham by-election
- 1955 Twickenham by-election

== See also ==
- Twickenham constituency
- List of United Kingdom by-elections
- Twickenham
