= Fred Mathias =

Welsh cricketer (1898-1955)

Personal information
- Full name: Frederick William Mathias
- Born: 7 August 1898; Abercynon, Glamorgan, Wales
- Died: 19 April 1955 (aged 56); Radyr, Glamorgan, Wales
- Nickname: Freddie
- Batting: Right-handed
- Bowling: Right-arm off spin

Domestic team information
- Years: Team
- 1926: Wales
- 1922–1930: Glamorgan

Career statistics
Competition	First-class
Matches	29
Runs scored	522
Batting average	12.42
100s/50s	–/2
Top score	65
Balls bowled	175
Wickets	3
Bowling average	42.00
5 wickets in innings	–
10 wickets in match	–
Best bowling	2/23
Catches/stumpings	8/–
- Source: Cricinfo, 19 June 2012

Frederick William Mathias MC (7 August 1898 – 19 April 1955) was a Welsh cricketer. Mathias was a right-handed batsman who bowled right-arm off spin. He was born at Abercynon, Glamorgan, and was educated at Clifton College.

Mathias served during World War I with the Royal Flying Corps, entering service in 1916 with the temporary rank of 2nd Lieutenant. By 1918, he was a temporary Captain. It was in 1918 that he was awarded the Military Cross for "conspicuous gallantry and devotion to duty". Mathias had flown in several successful engagements, doing considerable damage. He had also completed a number of successful reconnaissance flights. Following the war he was placed in the Welsh Regiment, relinquishing his appointment on 15 February 1920. After leaving the armed forced he attended Caius College, Cambridge.

Mathias made his first-class debut for Glamorgan against Nottinghamshire at Cardiff Arms Park in the 1922 County Championship. He made 27 further first-class appearances for the county, the last of which came against Oxford University at the University Parks in 1930. In his 28 matches for Glamorgan, he scored 457 runs at an average of 11.14, with a high score of 58. This was his only half century for Glamorgan and came against Hampshire in 1929. He also made a single first-class appearance for Wales against Ireland in 1926 at Ormeau Cricket Ground, Belfast. Winning the toss and batting first, Ireland made 299 all out, during which Mathias bowled seven wicketless overs. Wales responded in their first-innings by making 455/8 declared, with Mathias scoring 65 runs before he was dismissed by Gustavus Kelly. Ireland were then dismissed in their second-innings for 266, with Mathias taking the wickets of Albert Anderson and Robert Bowers, to finish with figures of 2/23 from 7.1 overs. The match ended as a draw.

Outside of cricket he worked as a stockbroker, but also worked at Cardiff Docks. He died at Radyr, Glamorgan, on 19 April 1955. His granddaughter, Tania Mathias, became a member of parliament.
