= John Ferguson (Conservative politician) =

British politician and banker (1870–1932)

Sir John Ferguson KBE
- Portrait by Walter Stoneman, 1918
- Born: May 19, 1870; Rosalyn, Aberdeenshire, Scotland
- Died: July 17, 1932 (aged 62); Southborough, Kent, England
- Occupations: Banker and Member of Parliament
- Spouse: Adelaide Telfer-Smollet (m. 1903)
- Children: 5

Sir John Ferguson KBE (19 May 1870 – 17 July 1932) was a banker and British Conservative Party politician.

== Early life and career ==
Sir John was born in Rosalyn, Aberdeenshire, on 19 May 1870. At the age of 16 he started work at the Aberdeen Town & County Bank, later moving to London to work for the Oriental Bank. Staying in London, he went on to become London Manager of the National Bank of Scotland.

During the First World War Sir John became Chairman of the Establishment Committee of the Ministry of Munitions and in 1917 he was assistant to Lord Inverforth, who was Surveyor General of Supply at the War Office. Sir John was made a KBE in 1918.

== Later career ==
When the National Bank of Scotland merged with Lloyd's Bank in 1918 Sir John became Joint General Manager of Lloyd's Bank, a post that he held until 1926. In 1926 he was appointed Deputy Chairman of Lipton's, later becoming the Chairman. He resigned from Lipton's in 1929 on becoming a member of parliament. From 1925-27 he was President of the Institute of Bankers.

== Political activity ==
In the 1929 General Election Sir John stood unsuccessfully as the Conservative candidate for Hammersmith South. The result of the election in the Hammersmith South constituency was:- Dan Chater (Socialist) 12,630 votes, Sir John Ferguson (Conservative) 12,218 votes, Captain J J Davies (Liberal) 3,796 votes. In August 1929 Sir John became the Member of Parliament for Twickenham after a by-election had been called due to the elevation to the peerage of Sir William Joynson-Hicks as Lord Brentford. The result of the by-election was:- Sir John Ferguson (Conservative) 14,705 votes, Mr J T Mason (Labour) 14,202 votes, Mr F G Paterson (Liberal) 1,920 votes. Sir John died on 17 July 1932 at his home Great Bounds, Southborough, Kent, while still in office.

== Personal life ==
In 1903 Sir John married Adelaide Telfer-Smollet, the daughter of Colonel Telfer-Smollet of Bonhill and Cameron, Dumbartonshire. They had one son, Ian, and four daughters:- Blanche, Diana, Norah and Jean.

- Leigh Rayment's Historical List of MPs

Parliament of the United Kingdom
Preceded by William Joynson-Hicks	Member of Parliament for Twickenham; 1929–1932	Succeeded by Hylton Murray-Philipson
