= Munira Wilson =

British Liberal Democrat politician

Munira Wilson MP
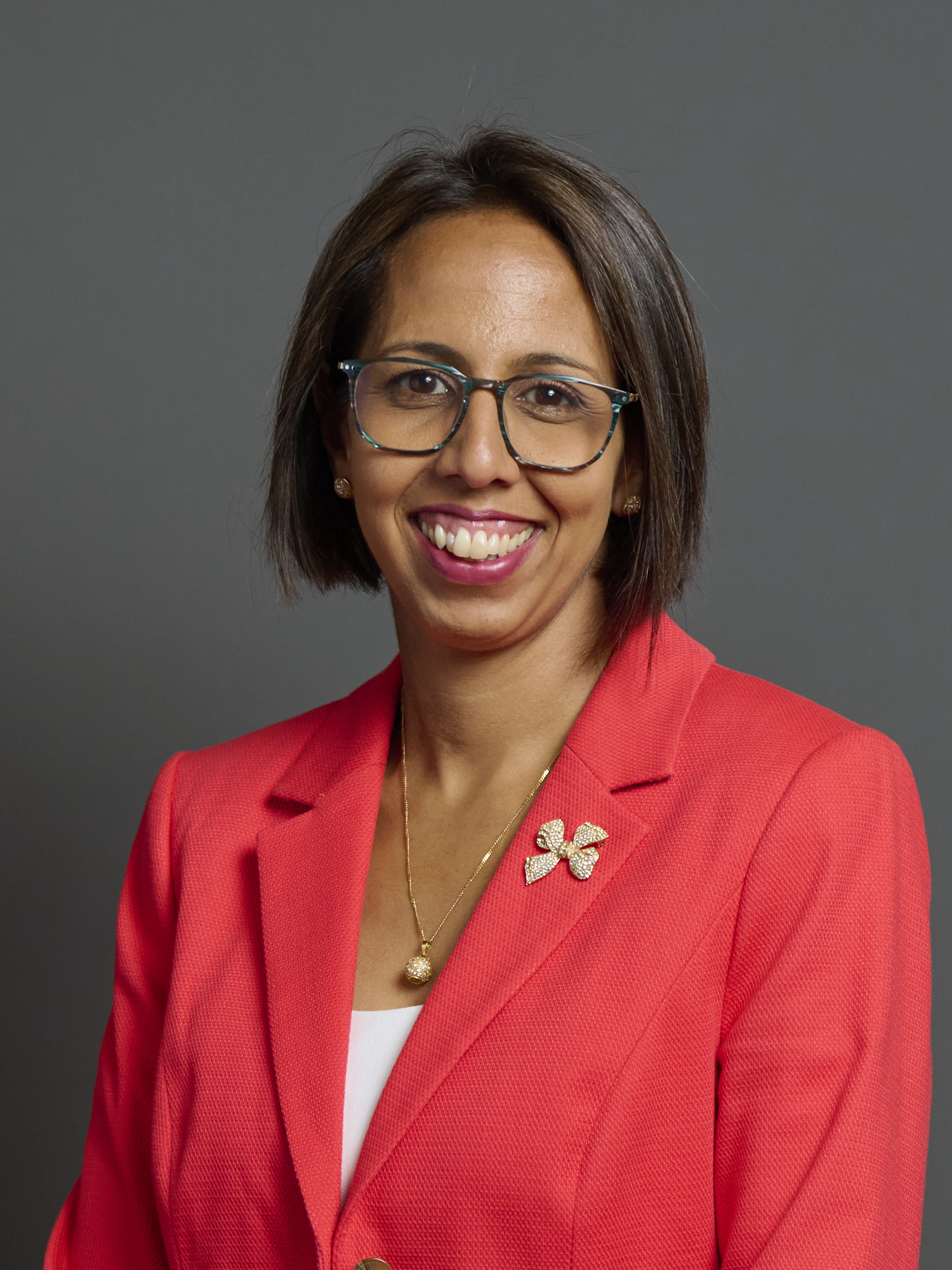
- Official portrait, 2024

Member of Parliament for Twickenham
- Incumbent
- Assumed office 12 December 2019
- Preceded by: Vince Cable
- Majority: 21,457 (40.0%)

Liberal Democrat portfolios
- 2020–2021: Health, Wellbeing and Social Care
- 2021–present: Education, Children and Families

Personal details
- Born: Munira Sherali Hassam; 26 April 1978 (age 48) London, England
- Party: Liberal Democrat
- Spouse: Michael Wilson (m. 2007)
- Children: 2
- Education: St Catharine's College, Cambridge (BA)
- Website: www.munira.org.uk

Munira Sherali Wilson (née Hassam; born 26 April 1978) is a British Liberal Democrat politician who has been Member of Parliament (MP) for Twickenham since 2019. She has served as the Liberal Democrat spokesperson for education since 2021 under Sir Ed Davey, and previously as the spokesperson for health, wellbeing and social care from 2020 to 2021.

== Early life and career ==
Munira Sherali Hassam was born on 26 April 1978 in London to parents of East African Indian heritage. Her parents were both born in Zanzibar. Her parents met in London where her father went to study, whilst her mother, aged 21 and stateless, fled to Britain during the Zanzibar Revolution.

She grew up in London and attended Henrietta Barnett School, a highly selective state grammar school in north London. She then went on to study at St Catharine's College, Cambridge, from 1996 to 2000, where she graduated with a degree in French and German, including a year abroad as an English assistant in two secondary schools in southern France.

After graduation, Hassam trained as a tax consultant with Ernst & Young. She then switched to working for the Liberal Democrats, becoming the campaigns organiser for Sue Doughty and the Guildford Liberal Democrats in 2004–2005, ahead of Doughty losing her Guildford seat at the 2005 general election. She went on to work for newly elected MP Nick Clegg for the first six months of 2006.

Wilson served a term as a councillor on Richmond upon Thames London Borough Council from 2006 to 2010. She contested Twickenham's neighbouring constituency of Feltham and Heston in the 2010 general election, where she came third. In the 2012 London Assembly election she stood in the constituency of South West.

Until her election to Parliament in 2019, Wilson worked for more than a decade as a lobbyist, first for Save the Children (2006–2008), then Beating Bowel Cancer (2008–2009), and Novartis (2009–2015), where she rose to become head of government affairs – pharmaceuticals. She then entered the public sector as a strategic account manager at NHS Digital from 2015 to 2016, before returning to lobbying from 2016 to 2019 as corporate affairs director, UK & Ireland for the German science and technology company Merck KGaA Darmstadt.

== Parliamentary career ==
Wilson was selected in 2019 from an all-women shortlist to replace Vince Cable as the Liberal Democrat candidate for Twickenham. At the 2019 general election, she was elected as MP for Twickenham with 56.1% of the vote and a majority of 14,121. The Green Party in Twickenham voted to stand aside in support of Wilson, an example of the electoral cooperation between the Liberal Democrats and the Green Party.

Wilson has opposed plans for a third runway at Heathrow Airport, and has worked to improve rail services in South West London. Twickenham is on a flight path to Heathrow, and Wilson has stated that "We are absolutely 100% opposed to Heathrow expansion." However, she supports the construction of HS2 high speed rail, saying that "HS2 is a vital project for reducing our carbon emissions and unlocking the economic potential of the North, but Ministers should not be given a blank cheque.".

She was appointed Liberal Democrat spokesperson for health, wellbeing and social care by acting leader Ed Davey in January 2020.

In May 2021, alongside celebrities and other public figures, Wilson was a signatory to an open letter from Stylist magazine which called on the government to address what it described as an "epidemic of male violence" by funding an "ongoing, high-profile, expert-informed awareness campaign on men's violence against women and girls".

In June 2022, she was accused by the National Union of Rail, Maritime and Transport Workers (RMT) of supporting 'strike-breaking' after calling for the army to intervene to keep trains running amid the railway strikes during a televised BBC debate.

At the 2024 general election, Wilson was re-elected as MP for Twickenham with an increased vote share of 56.3% and an increased majority of 21,457.

In September 2024, Wilson criticised Thames Water's proposed Teddington Direct River Abstraction scheme, which would take water from the River Thames during periods of drought and replace it with treated wastewater pumped from Mogden Sewage Treatment Works above Teddington Lock. She said that unanswered questions about chemicals remaining in the treated water meant the scheme could pose risks to the environment and human health, and called on the government to reconsider the proposal.

On 8 January 2025, Wilson voted against a Conservative amendment calling for a new statutory national inquiry into historical child sexual exploitation, commonly described as grooming gangs, with the Liberal Democrats instead arguing that the recommendations of the earlier Independent Inquiry into Child Sexual Abuse should be implemented.

On 17 June 2025, Wilson voted in favour of an amendment to the Crime and Policing Bill that decriminalised women ending their own pregnancies in England and Wales, including after the 24-week limit. The amendment did not change the rules governing abortion services under the Abortion Act 1967.

On 20 June 2025, Wilson voted against the Terminally Ill Adults (End of Life) Bill at its third reading. The bill would have allowed eligible terminally ill adults in England and Wales to receive medical assistance to end their lives.

== Personal life ==
Munira Sherali Hassam married Michael Robert Wilson at St Stephen's, Twickenham, in 2007. They have a son and a daughter, and live in Whitton. She was raised a Muslim and converted to Christianity.

Parliament of the United Kingdom
Preceded by Vince Cable	Member of Parliament for Twickenham; 2019–present	Incumbent
