= Granville Slack =

George Granville Slack (11 July 1906 – 30 November 2003), known as Granville Slack, was a British judge and Liberal politician.

Slack attended Accrington Grammar School before studying history followed by law at the University of London, where he obtained an honours degree in history in 1926, a law degree in 1929 and a master's law degree in 1932. He was called to the bar at Gray's Inn in 1929. During World War II, Slack joined the Royal Air Force Volunteer Reserve and wrote a number of books on the legal situation around war matters, such as liability for war damage and national service. He later worked with the Intelligence Branch of the Air Ministry.

Slack first stood for the Liberal Party at the 1945 general election, losing in Twickenham; he also stood unsuccessfully in Dewsbury in 1950. He served as Chairman of the London Liberal Party in 1947/8 and again from 1950 to 1953.

In 1967, Slack was appointed as a judge at Croydon County Court, transferring to Willesden in 1976, and retiring in 1981. In his spare time, he chaired a housing society, and was active in the Acton Baptist Church.
