= Hylton Murray-Philipson =

Hylton Ralph Murray-Philipson (12 November 1902 – 24 May 1934) was a Conservative Party politician in the United Kingdom who served as a member of parliament (MP) from 1932 to 1934.

He was educated at Eton College. He unsuccessfully contested the 1929 general election in the Labour-held Scottish constituency of Peebles and Southern.

He next stood for Parliament at the Twickenham by-election on 16 September 1932, following the death of the Conservative MP John Ferguson. Murray-Philipson held the seat with a comfortable majority, but died in office in 1934, aged 31.

Parliament of the United Kingdom
Preceded by John Ferguson	Member of Parliament for Twickenham; 1932–1934	Succeeded by Alfred Critchley
