= 1955 Twickenham by-election =

UK parliamentary by-election

The 1955 Twickenham by-election was a parliamentary by-election held on 25 January 1955 for the British House of Commons constituency of Twickenham in Middlesex.

The seat had become vacant when the constituency's Conservative Member of Parliament (MP), Sir Edward Keeling, had died on 23 November 1954. He had held the seat since the 1935 general election.

The result was a comfortable victory for the Conservative candidate Gresham Cooke, a director of the Society of Motor Manufacturers and Traders. He held the seat until his death shortly before the 1970 general election.

== Result ==
1955 Twickenham by-election
Party	Candidate	Votes	%	±%
Conservative	Gresham Cooke	23,075	64.0	+1.9
Labour	R. P. Pitman	12,953	36.0	−1.9
Majority		10,122	28.0	+3.8
Turnout		36,028	47.3	−38.4
Registered electors		76,147		
Conservative hold		Swing	-1.9	

== See also ==
- Twickenham constituency
- Twickenham
- 1929 Twickenham by-election
- 1932 Twickenham by-election
- 1934 Twickenham by-election
- Lists of United Kingdom by-elections
