= Alfred Critchley =

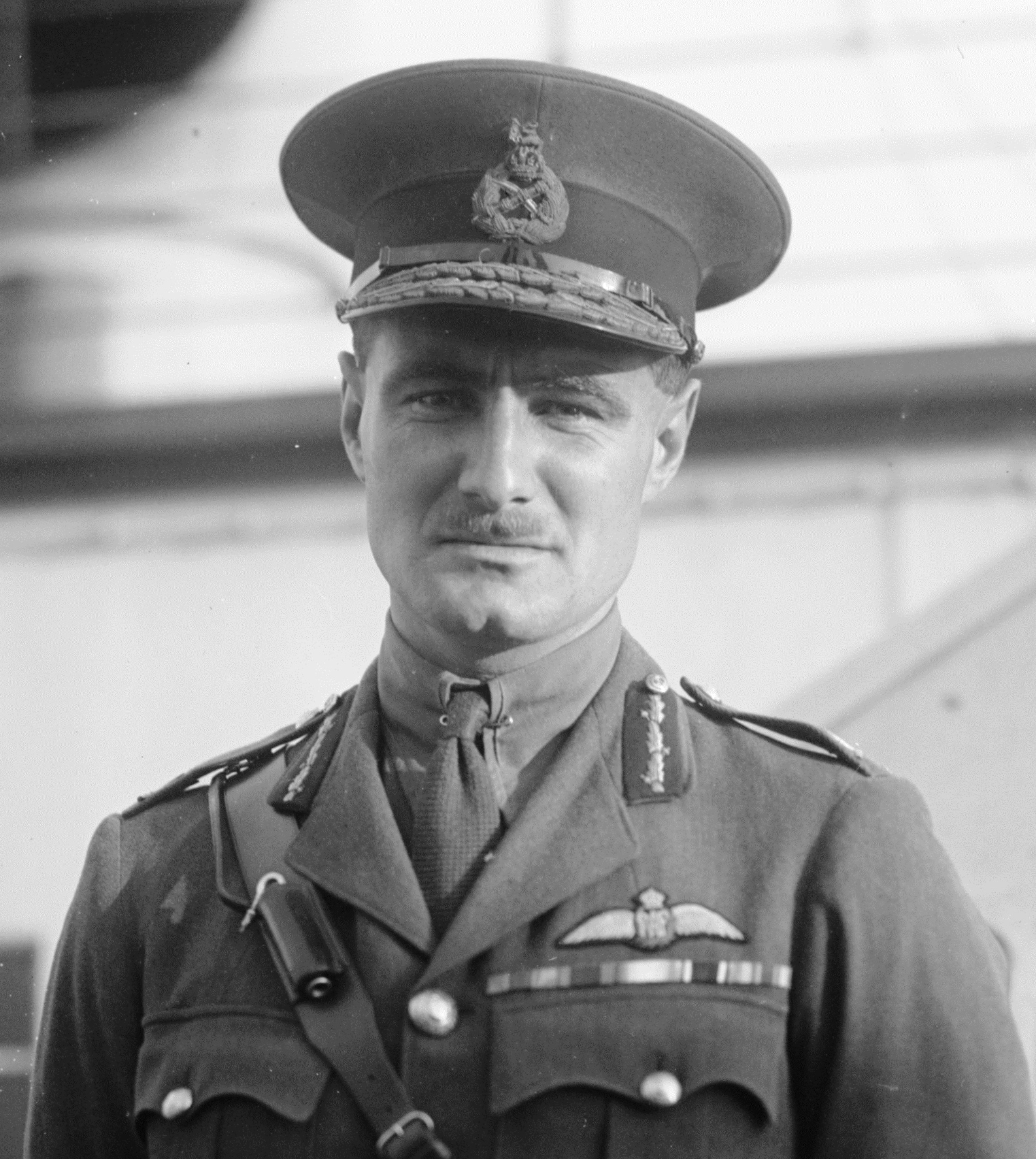
- Critchley in 1915
- Born: 23 February 1890; Calgary, Alberta, Canada
- Died: 9 February 1963 (aged 72)
- Military career
- Allegiance: Canada; United Kingdom
- Branch: Canadian Army (1907–18); Royal Air Force (1918–43)
- Service years: 1907–19; 1939–43
- Rank: Air Commodore
- Commands: No. 54 (Reserve) Group (1939–43); RAF Training Brigade (1918–19)
- Conflicts: First World War; Second World War
- Awards: Companion of the Order of St Michael and St George; Commander of the Order of the British Empire; Distinguished Service Order; Mentioned in Despatches
- Other work: Member of Parliament for Twickenham (1934–35) co-Founder of Greyhound Racing Association

Air Commodore Alfred Cecil Critchley, CMG, CBE, DSO (23 February 1890 – 9 February 1963) was a military commander, entrepreneur and politician in the United Kingdom. He served as a Conservative Member of Parliament (MP) from 1934 to 1935.

== Early life and military career ==
Critchley was born in Calgary, Northwest Territories (now Alberta), Canada in 1890 and brought to England at the age of nine and attended St Bees School in Cumberland. . His first career was a military one, initially in Lord Strathcona's Horse, a Canadian military regiment and, towards the end of the First World War, in the Royal Flying Corps (RFC). He was seconded to the RFC on 4 March 1918 with the temporary rank of brigadier general at the age of only 28. Remaining in the RFC and then Royal Air Force to the end of the war, Critchley played a senior role in organising training, commanding the RFC and then RAF's Cadet Brigade. By the end of the war he had become the youngest brigadier general in the British Imperial forces and had married Maryon Galt, the cousin of the wife of the press baron Sir Max Aitken, later Lord Beaverbrook.

== Business and politics ==
After the war Critchley involved himself in a number of business ventures in Central America before returning to the UK where he became a director of Associated Portland Cement. In 1926 he helped form the private company, the Greyhound Racing Association (GRA). Under the auspices of this company he became a significant sporting entrepreneur in the UK. The company introduced greyhound racing to the UK in Belle Vue, Manchester in 1926. The success of this initial trial led the company to purchase the White City Stadium in London. The GRA subsequently built both the Harringay Stadium and Harringay Arena.

He was married for a second time in London to Miss Joan Foster of Mount Street, London on 22 December 1927.

Critchley contested the 1929 general election as a Conservative in the Manchester Gorton constituency, a safe seat for the Labour Party where he was heavily defeated.

In February 1931, he contested the Islington East by-election as a candidate for the Empire Free Trade Crusade and the United Empire Party, which both sought to make the British Empire a free trade bloc. The Empire Crusade had won the Paddington South by-election in October 1930, and hoped to repeat its success. Critchley came second, with 27.2% of the votes, and the Empire Crusade never won another seat.

He rejoined the Conservative Party, and won the Twickenham by-election on 22 June 1934. Nevertheless, he did not contest the 1935 general election.

He was a director general of the British Overseas Airways Corporation from 1943 to 1946.

In 1953 he suffered a severe infection which caused him to go blind. In 1954 he was involved in the publishing deals of Robert Maxwell.

== Sport ==
In addition to his interest in greyhound racing, Critchley was a keen sportsman, and was a leading amateur golfer who won the French, Belgian and Dutch open amateur championships, and competed in the first Masters Tournament in 1934. He also took part in bobsleigh events with his son John Galt Critchley, who went on to claim a silver medal at the FIBT World Championships 1939.

Military offices
New title Brigade established	General Officer Commanding RFC Cadet Brigade; RAF Cadet Brigade from 1 April 1918; 1917-1918	Succeeded by C A H Longcroft; As Commandant RAF (Cadet) College
Parliament of the United Kingdom
Preceded by Hylton Murray-Philipson	Member of Parliament for Twickenham; 1934–1935	Succeeded by Sir Edward Keeling
