= Tania Mathias =

British Conservative politician

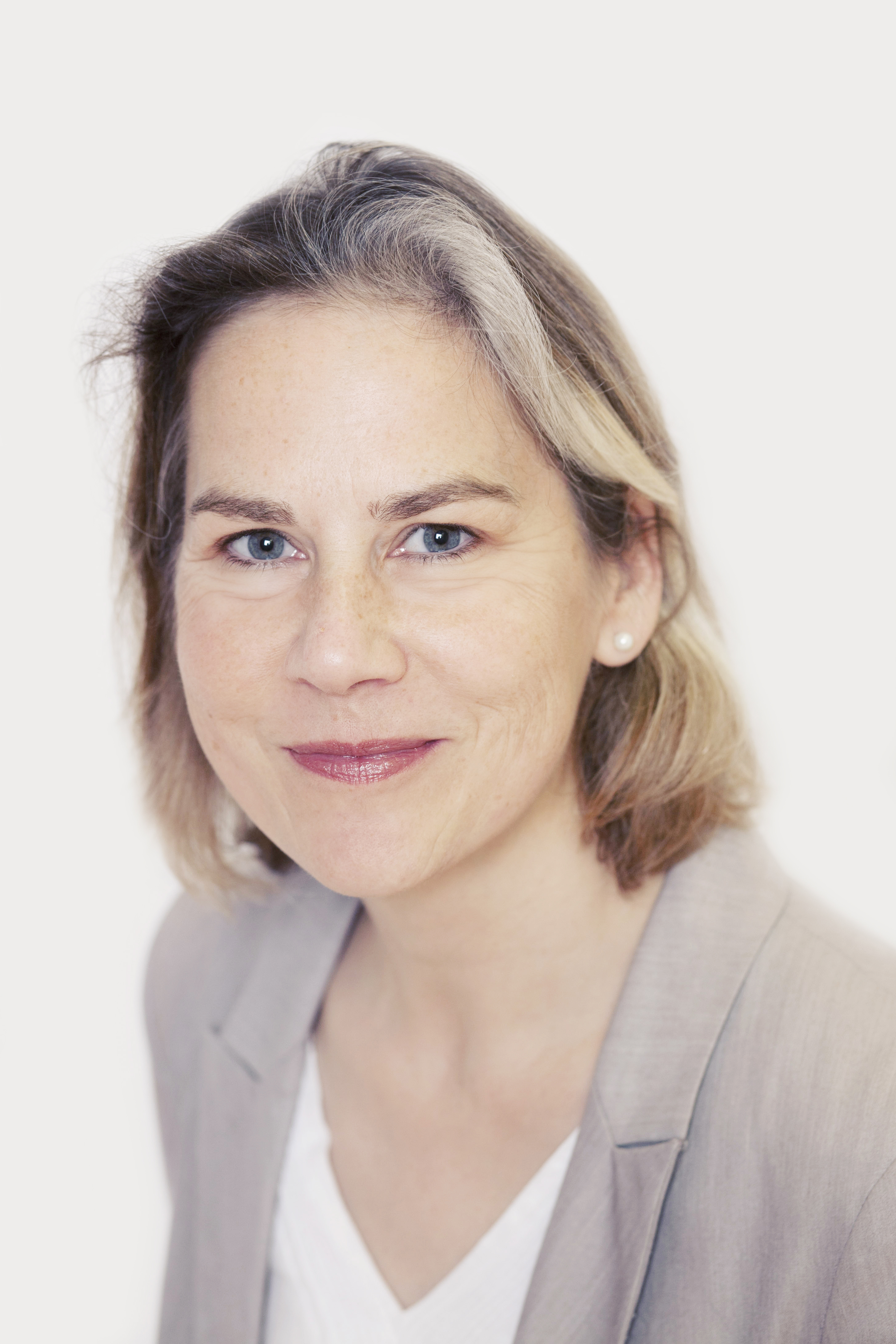
- Mathias in 2013

Member of Parliament for Twickenham
- In office 7 May 2015 – 3 May 2017
- Preceded by: Vince Cable
- Succeeded by: Vince Cable

Personal details
- Born: Tania Wyn Mathias; 21 June 1964 (age 62) Kensington, London, England
- Party: Conservative
- Education: St Catherine's College, Oxford; Christ Church, Oxford

Tania Wyn Mathias (born 21 June 1964) is a British politician and ophthalmologist. She served as the Member of Parliament for Twickenham from May 2015 to June 2017.

In May 2024, Mathias was selected as the Conservative candidate for Maidenhead for the 2024 general election, following the retirement of the incumbent MP and former Prime Minister Theresa May. She was defeated by Josh Reynolds of the Liberal Democrats.

== Early life and career ==
Mathias was born in Kensington, London on 21 June 1964 and raised in Barnes. She was educated at St Paul's Girls' School, an all-girls private school in Hammersmith, London. She studied at St Catherine's College, Oxford and Christ Church, Oxford, graduating with Bachelor of Medicine, Bachelor of Surgery (MB BCh) degrees in 1988. Her grandfather, Fred Mathias, played rugby and cricket for Glamorgan and was awarded the Military Cross in 1918 for his exploits flying over enemy lines in Belgium and France.

Soon after graduating in medicine, Mathias was a refugee worker for the United Nations Relief and Works Agency (UNRWA) in the Gaza Strip and treated HIV, AIDS and tuberculosis patients in Africa. She has also treated leprosy patients in North Bihar, India and South China. She was employed by the NHS as an eye doctor.

== Political career ==
In 2010, Mathias was elected to the London Borough of Richmond upon Thames as councillor for Hampton Wick. She was re-elected in 2014, but stepped down as a councillor shortly after becoming MP.

At the 2015 general election, Mathias was elected as the MP for Twickenham, defeating the Liberal Democrat cabinet minister, Vince Cable. She was appointed a member of the Science and Technology Select Committee in July 2015.

Mathias was defeated by Cable, by then knighted, in the snap 2017 general election by almost 10,000 votes, when Cable won the highest vote share for the Liberal Democrats in any constituency nationally at 52.8%. She was one of five Conservative candidates who were controversially given £5,000 by a business run by a former Conservative party treasurer, Michael Spencer, to fund their campaigns against Liberal Democrat opponents who had supported the EU "Remain" campaign.

=== Views ===
In Parliament, Mathias voted the same way as other Conservative MPs on the vast majority of issues. However, she voted differently from her colleagues on occasion, most consistently for: allowing terminally ill people to be given assistance to end their life, requiring pub companies to offer pub landlords rent-only leases, and for unilaterally guaranteeing the rights of EU citizens living in the UK; (she was one of only two Conservative MPs to vote against the government on this).

Mathias opposed US President Donald Trump's refugee policy. She was opposed to Brexit prior to the 2016 referendum.

Mathias opposed of the expansion of Heathrow Airport, and voiced her objection in the House of Commons on several occasions. She reacted negatively to the UK government's decision to begin consultation for the construction of a third runway, declaring expansion "misguided and not in the nation's interest".

== Personal life ==
Mathias is a Quaker. She was one of three Quakers elected during the 2015 general election, the others being Ruth Cadbury and Catherine West, both Labour MPs.

Parliament of the United Kingdom
Preceded by Vince Cable	Member of Parliament for Twickenham; 2015–2017	Succeeded by Sir Vince Cable
