= Oliver Jessel =

New Zealand-born British businessman

Oliver Richard Jessel
- Born: 24 August 1929; New Zealand
- Died: 21 June 2017 (aged 87)
- Occupation: Businessman
- Known for: Founder of Jessel Securities; ownership interests in Demerara Sugar Company, P&O, Firth Brown, Johnsons, Maple Macowards, France Fenwick
- Notable work: London Indemnity & General Insurance acquisition (1968)
- Relatives: Toby Jessel (brother, MP); Camilla Jessel (sister, wife of composer Andrzej Panufnik)

Oliver Richard Jessel (24 August 1929 – 21 June 2017) was a New Zealand born British businessman who through Jessel Securities owned the Demerara Sugar Company, P&O, the steel companies Firth Brown and Johnsons, retailers Maple Macowards and the financial services company France Fenwick. In 1968 he acquired London Indemnity & General Insurance which proved to be his downfall when he was forced to liquidate his fortune to support the firm after heavy redemption of its products by savers.

== Personal life ==
Jessel's younger brother, Toby, was a Member of Parliament. His younger sister, Camilla, was the wife of the Polish-born composer Andrzej Panufnik.

== See also ==
- Jim Slater
