= Toby Jessel =

British politician

- Jessel in 1987

Member of Parliament for Twickenham
- In office 18 June 1970 – 8 April 1997
- Preceded by: Gresham Cooke
- Succeeded by: Vince Cable

Personal details
- Born: Toby Henry Francis Jessel; 11 July 1934 Bearsted, England
- Died: 3 December 2018 (aged 84) East Sussex, England
- Party: Conservative
- Spouses: Philippa Jephcott (m. 1967; div. 1973) Eira Heath (m. 1980)
- Children: 1
- Relatives: Marcus Samuel, 1st Viscount Bearsted (great-grandfather); Nellie Ionides (grandmother); Oliver Jessel (brother); Andrzej Panufnik (brother-in-law); Roxanna Panufnik (niece)
- Education: Balliol College, Oxford

Toby Henry Francis Jessel (11 July 1934 – 3 December 2018) was a British Conservative Party politician, who was the Member of Parliament for Twickenham from 1970 to 1997.

== Early life ==
Jessel was born at Bearsted in Kent on 11 July 1934, the son of Winifred Levy (1905–1977) and Commander Richard Frederick Jessel, D.S.O. (1902–1988), a Royal Navy officer. He was the great-grandson of Marcus Samuel, 1st Viscount Bearsted, and his great-great uncle was the judge George Jessel. Through the latter, Jessel was distantly related to American actor George "Georgie" Jessel. Toby Jessel's sister Camilla married the Polish-born composer Andrzej Panufnik.

Jessel received his formal education at the Royal Naval College, Dartmouth, and at Balliol College, Oxford.

== Political career ==
Jessel joined the Conservative Party, and served as a councillor in the London Borough of Southwark from 1964. In that year he also contested Peckham in the general election; then in 1966 he twice fought Kingston upon Hull North, first in a by-election and then at the general election which followed. He represented Richmond upon Thames on the Greater London Council between 1967 and 1973.

He was elected as the Member of Parliament for Twickenham at the 1970 general election (the seat having been vacant since the death of Gresham Cooke on 22 February 1970), and held it for almost 30 years until being defeated in the 1997 general election by Vince Cable of the Liberal Democrats.

== Personal life ==
Jessel married Philippa Jephcott in 1967; they were divorced in 1973. Their only child, Sarah, was killed in a car accident in 1976 at the age of five. He married his second wife, Eira Heath, in 1980. Jessel's elder brother, Oliver, died on 21 June 2017.

Jessel played the piano from an early age, and unsuccessfully applied to study at the Royal Academy of Music during his youth.

Jessel resided at The Old Court House near Hampton Court Palace for decades, until selling it in 2013. Thereafter, he lived in East Sussex, where he died on 3 December 2018, at the age of 84.

== Bibliography ==
- Times Guide to the House of Commons, Times Newspapers Limited, 1997

Parliament of the United Kingdom
Preceded by Gresham Cooke	Member of Parliament for Twickenham; 1970 – 1997	Succeeded by Vince Cable
