= 1934 Twickenham by-election =

UK parliamentary by-election

← 1932	22 June 1934	1935 →

Constituency of Twickenham
- Registered: 81,529
- Turnout: 55.5% (▲3.6%)
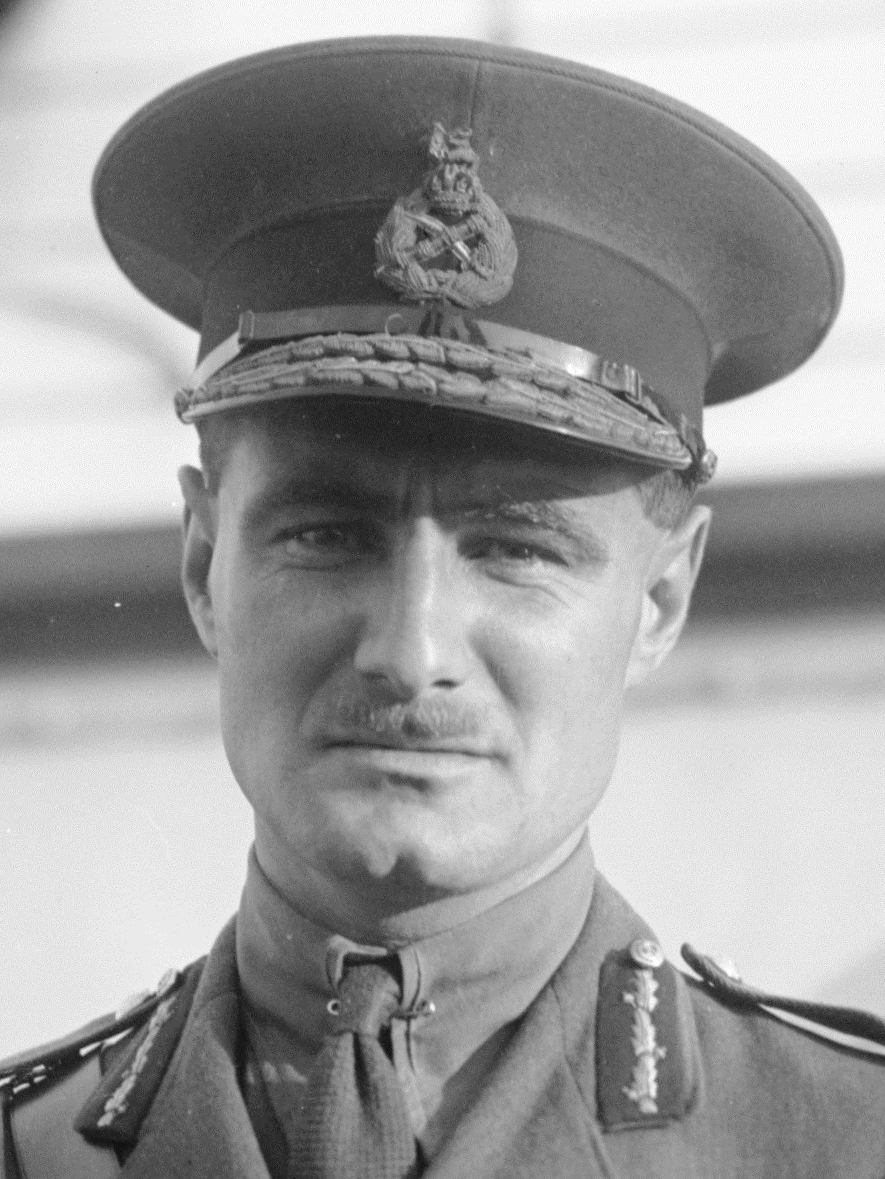
	First party	Second party
		Lab
Candidate	Alfred Critchley	Percy Holman
Party	Conservative	Labour
Popular vote	23,395	19,890
Percentage	56.1%	43.9%
Swing	▼0.1%	▲0.1%
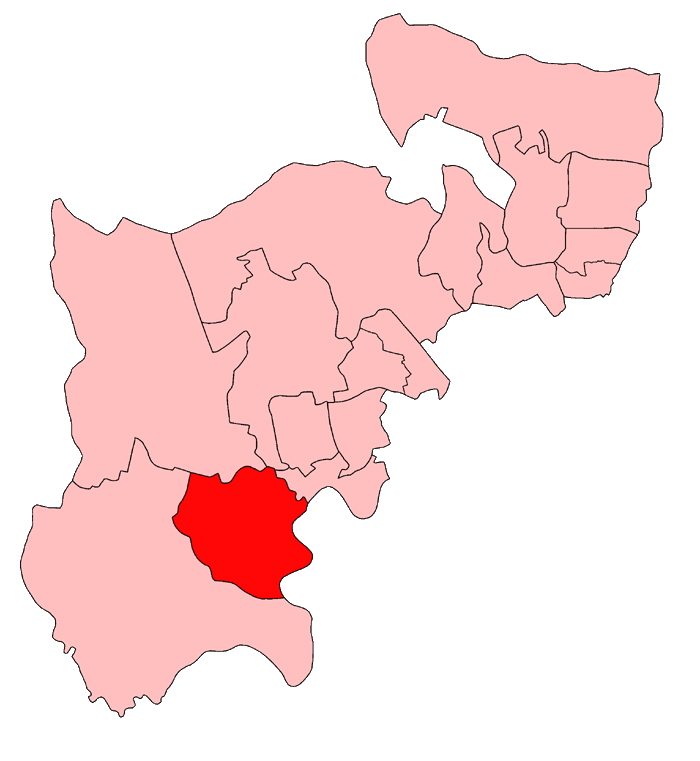
- A map of parliamentary constituencies within the county of Middlesex at the time of the by-election, with Twickenham highlighted in red.
MP before election
Hylton Murray-Philipson
Conservative
Elected MP
Alfred Critchley
Conservative

The 1934 Twickenham by-election was a parliamentary by-election held on 22 June 1934 for the British House of Commons constituency of Twickenham in Middlesex.

The seat had become vacant when the constituency's Conservative Member of Parliament (MP), Hylton Murray-Philipson, died on 24 May 1934, aged 31. He had held the seat since a by-election in 1932.

The result was a victory for the Conservative candidate Alfred Critchley, who had stood for the Empire Free Trade Crusade and the United Empire Party in the 1931 Islington East by-election and as a Conservative at the 1929 general election.

== Result ==
1934 Twickenham by-election
Party	Candidate	Votes	%	±%
Conservative	Alfred Critchley	23,395	56.1	−0.1
Labour Co-op	Percy Holman	19,890	43.9	+0.1
Majority		5,505	12.2	−0.2
Turnout		43,285	55.5	+3.6
Registered electors		81,529		
Conservative hold		Swing	-0.1	

== See also ==
- Twickenham constituency
- Twickenham
- 1929 Twickenham by-election
- 1932 Twickenham by-election
- 1955 Twickenham by-election
- Lists of United Kingdom by-elections
