= Gresham Cooke =

British politician

Roger Gresham Cooke

Member of Parliament for Twickenham
- In office 1955–1970
- Preceded by: Edward Keeling
- Succeeded by: Toby Jessel

Personal details
- Born: January 26, 1907
- Died: February 22, 1970 (aged 63)
- Party: Conservative Party
- Spouse: Rosalie Anne Pinckney (m. 1934)
- Relatives: George Monbiot (grandson)
- Education: Winchester College; New College, Oxford; Trinity College, Cambridge
- Occupation: Barrister, politician

Roger Gresham Cooke (26 January 1907 – 22 February 1970), usually known as Gresham Cooke, was a British Conservative Party politician.

== Early life ==
Cooke was the son of Arthur Cooke, senior surgeon to Addenbrooke's Hospital, and the elder brother of RAF pilot Nicholas Gresham Cooke. He was educated at Winchester College, New College, Oxford, and Trinity College, Cambridge, where he read law. He was called to the Bar at the Inner Temple in 1930, and spent five years practising as a barrister before joining the British Road Federation as secretary in 1935, later becoming chairman of its Highways Committee. After the Second World War, in 1946, he was appointed director of the Society of Motor Manufacturers and Traders, a representational role which he held during a difficult period for the UK's economy and motor industry until 1955.

== Political career ==
Cooke was Member of Parliament for Twickenham from 1955 until his death aged 63 in 1970. He enjoyed a reputation in parliament as a voice for the motor industry, advocating tirelessly for better roads and becoming joint secretary of the Conservative Parliamentary Transport Committee soon after his election. However, he was not always on the side of the motorist, putting forward proposals to ban 100,000 drivers a year (as a warning to improve safety standards) and a pay-as-you-drive tax in some cities. No by-election was held after his death, as the 1970 general election followed only four months later, in which Toby Jessel was elected as Cooke's successor.

== Personal life ==
Cooke married Rosalie Anne, daughter of J.R.H. Pinckney in 1934. His grandson is the journalist and environmental activist George Monbiot.

== Other activities ==
A few days before he died Cooke was lobbying for Britain's motor racing achievements to be commemorated through a special issue of postage stamps.

Parliament of the United Kingdom
Preceded by Edward Keeling	Member of Parliament for Twickenham; 1955 – 1970	Succeeded by Toby Jessel
