= William Thomas Goode =

- Born: 1859; Warwick
- Died: 5 August 1932 (aged 72–73)
- Occupation: Journalist, professor
- Employer: Owens College; London County Council; The Manchester Guardian

William Thomas Goode (1859–1932) was a British academic, linguist and journalist. As special correspondent for The Manchester Guardian, he interviewed Vladimir Lenin in Moscow in 1919. On his return journey from Moscow, he was arrested by Estonian authorities and then detained aboard a British warship. He was active in the Labour Party until his death.

== Early life ==
Goode was born in the fourth quarter of 1859 in Warwick, Warwickshire, one of nine children of Sarah (née Adams) and William Goode, of Westgate, Warwick.

Goode held an M.A. degree from London. By 1881 he was lodging at 1 Georges Villa, Lambeth, London.

== Career ==
He was Master of Method at Owens College, Manchester from 1891 until his resignation in 1898. For the first two decades of the 20th century, Goode was principal of London County Council's Graystoke Day Training College for Teachers.

He was a Professor of Languages. In 1911 he was awarded a second, honorary, M.A. by the Victoria University of Manchester. He lectured in Australia and New Zealand.

He was a special correspondent for The Manchester Guardian in Finland in 1918 and in Finland, the Baltic provinces and Russia in 1919.

His journalism was usually signed W. T. Goode.

=== Lenin interview ===
In 1919, Goode travelled to and spent a month in Moscow. Near the end of his stay there, he visited The Kremlin, where he was granted a brief interview with Vladimir Lenin. Although Goode was accompanied by a translator, and offered to use German or French, the interview was conducted, by both participants, in English. He had time for just three questions:

- how far did the proposals which William Bullitt took to the 1919–1920 Paris Peace Conference still hold good?
- what was the attitude of the Soviet Republic to the small nations who had split off the Russian Empire and proclaimed their independence?
- what guarantees could be offered against official propaganda among the Western peoples, if by any chance relations with the Soviet Republic were opened?

Lenin answered all three, and made a short statement calling for the publication of the Soviet constitution in the UK and extolling that system's virtues.

While in Moscow, Goode also interviewed several other Soviet leaders, including:

- Georgy Tchitcherin, the People's Commissar for Foreign Affairs
- Nikolay Miliutin, then Associate Commissar for National Economics
- Semyon Sereda, Commissar for Agriculture
- Schmidt, Commissar for Labour
- Grigory Melnichansky, secretary of the Moscow Alliance of Professional Alliance
- Leonid Krasin, Commissar for Transport
- Anatoly Lunacharsky, Commissar for Education and Mikhail Pokrovsky, his deputy
- Lev Kamenev, President of the Soviet, and Dmitry Kursky, Commissar for Justice
- Maxim Litvinoff
- Kliment Timiryazev

Each of those interviews formed a chapter in his subsequent book, Bolshevism at Work.

=== Return from Moscow ===
Goode returned from Moscow via Estonia, where he was arrested, as Estonia was at war with the Bolshevik forces in Russia. He later claimed that his arrest was carried out at the behest of the British authorities.

After his release, he was detained aboard a Royal Navy cruiser, for several days.

On 4 November 1919, once news of Goode's detentions became known in England, Joseph Kenworthy asked a question about them in the House of Commons. In response, Cecil Harmsworth, the Under-Secretary of State for Foreign Affairs, said that Goode had been detained by the Navy only while instructions for what to do with him had been obtained and he had quickly been released. In reply to a follow up question from Kenworthy, Harmsworth said that Goode was not owed an apology.

== Politics ==
Goode spoke publicly and favourably of Bolshevik policies and conditions in the USSR. He said:

At Judgment Day, let me stand in the dock with Lenin and Trotsky, and not with one people.

He became president of Tavistock Labour Party in 1927.

== Death ==
Goode moved to The Shack, Dolvin Road, Tavistock, in 1923.

He died on 5 August 1932, aged 72, after a period of illness. He was buried at Tavistock New Cemetery. He left an estate of 34,932. Never having married, his sole executor was his nephew, H. J. London.

== Works ==
- Bolshevism at Work. George Allen & Unwin. 1920 – via Internet Archive.
- Schools, Teachers and Scholars in Soviet Russia. London: Williams and Norgate. 1929. (foreword)
