= 1929 Twickenham by-election =

UK parliamentary by-election

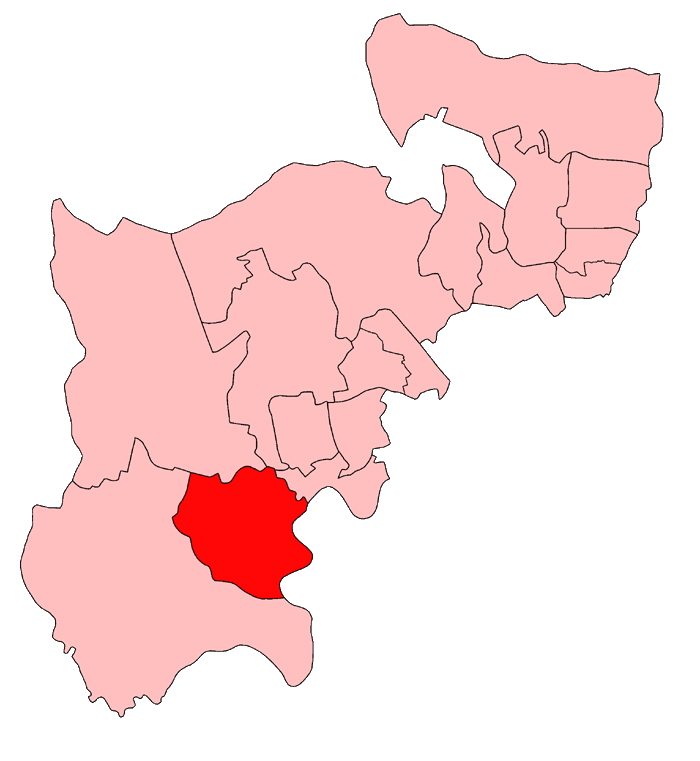
Twickenham in 1929

The 1929 Twickenham by-election was a parliamentary by-election held on 8 August 1929 for the British House of Commons constituency of Twickenham in Middlesex.

== Vacancy ==
The seat had become vacant when the constituency's Conservative Member of Parliament (MP), Sir William Joynson-Hicks, had been elevated to the peerage as Viscount Brentford. He had held the seat since its creation for the 1918 general election.

== Candidates ==
The Liberal Party ran 55-year-old Frederick Graham Paterson. He was a barrister of Gray's Inn, educated at New College, Oxford. He had been Liberal candidate here at the last general election and had previously contested Lowestoft in 1923 and 1924.

== Result ==
The result was a narrow victory for the Conservative candidate Sir John Ferguson, from whom the Conservative Central Office withdrew support over his advocacy of Empire free trade. Ferguson died in office three years later, triggering the 1932 Twickenham by-election.

1929 Twickenham by-election
Party	Candidate	Votes	%	±%
Unionist	John Ferguson	14,705	47.7	−0.8
Labour	Thomas Jackson Mason	14,202	46.1	+11.3
Liberal	Frederick Paterson	1,920	6.2	−10.5
Majority		503	1.6	−12.1
Turnout		30,827	49.5	−20.3
Registered electors		62,264		
Unionist hold		Swing	-6.6	

== See also ==
- Twickenham constituency
- Twickenham
- 1932 Twickenham by-election
- 1934 Twickenham by-election
- 1955 Twickenham by-election
- List of United Kingdom by-elections
