= 1932 Twickenham by-election =

UK parliamentary by-election

The 1932 Twickenham by-election was a parliamentary by-election held on 16 September 1932 for the British House of Commons constituency of Twickenham in Middlesex.

The seat had become vacant when the constituency's Conservative Member of Parliament (MP), Sir John Ferguson, died on 17 July 1932, aged 62. He had held the seat since a by-election in 1929.

The result was a victory for the 29-year-old Conservative candidate Hylton Murray-Philipson, who died in office two years later, which caused another by-election.

== Result ==
1932 Twickenham by-election
Party	Candidate	Votes	%	±%
Conservative	Hylton Murray-Philipson	21,688	56.2	−17.8
Labour Co-op	Percy Holman	16,881	43.8	+17.8
Majority		4,807	12.4	−35.6
Turnout		38,569	51.9	−19.4
Registered electors		74,272		
Conservative hold		Swing	-17.8	

== See also ==
- Twickenham constituency
- Twickenham
- 1929 Twickenham by-election
- 1934 Twickenham by-election
- 1955 Twickenham by-election
- List of United Kingdom by-elections
