= Twickenham (constituency) =

Parliamentary constituency in the United Kingdom, 1918 onwards

Coordinates: 51.428°N 0.345°W

- Borough constituency for the House of Commons
- Interactive map of boundaries from 2024
- Location within Greater London
- County: Greater London
- Electorate: 75,889 (March 2020)
- Major settlements: Twickenham, Hampton and Teddington

Current constituency
- Created: 1918
- Member of Parliament: Munira Wilson (Liberal Democrats)
- Seats: One
- Created from: Brentford

Twickenham is a constituency in Greater London (Note: A borough constituency (for the purposes of election expenses and type of returning officer).) represented in the House of Commons of the UK Parliament since 2019 by Munira Wilson of the Liberal Democrats. (Note: As with all constituencies, the constituency elects one member of parliament (MP) by the first past the post system of election at least every five years.)

== Constituency profile ==
Twickenham (foreground) and Richmond (background)

Twickenham is a constituency in Greater London in England, within the Borough of Richmond upon Thames. It covers the town of Twickenham and the areas of St Margarets, Teddington, Hampton, Hampton Hill and Hampton Wick.

This is a suburban constituency located on the outskirts of London, around 10 miles (16 km) south-west of the city centre. Twickenham was traditionally a rural town with a history of gunpowder production. It became a fashionable suburb during the Victorian era with many large properties, green spaces and golf courses. This constituency contains numerous palaces and stately homes including Marble Hill House, Strawberry Hill House and, most famously, the 16th-century Hampton Court Palace, a favourite residence of King Henry VIII. The Twickenham constituency is highly-affluent with low levels of deprivation and a mixture of housing types. House prices here are generally higher than the rest of London, and the average price is more than double the overall UK average.

Twickenham has low proportions of young adults and retirees, and a large population of middle-aged adults with families. Residents have very high rates of income and high levels of homeownership compared to the rest of London. The child poverty rate is less than a third of the UK-wide rate. Residents are very well-educated and a high proportion work in education, the arts and professional occupations. The percentage claiming unemployment benefits is low. White people made up 81% of the population at the 2021 census, around one-fifth of whom were of non-British origin including Irish and Italian communities. Asians, including Indian and Chinese populations, were the largest ethnic minority group at 9%.

At the local borough council, all seats in this constituency are represented by Liberal Democrats. Voters in Twickenham strongly supported remaining in the European Union in the 2016 referendum; an estimated 69% voted to remain compared to the UK-wide figure of 48%.

== History ==
Since 1945, the boundaries of the seat have been similar to those of the abolished Municipal Borough of Twickenham.

From 1931 until 1983, Twickenham was a safe seat of the Conservative Party and from 1983 until 1997 a marginal seat for that party.

Liberal Democrat Vince Cable gained the seat during the 1997 landslide Conservative defeat and held it until 2015. The seat was one of very few in Britain that gave the Liberal Democrats a majority of votes in the 2005 and 2010 elections, being their sixth best performance nationally in 2010. (Note: By share of the vote, behind five seats: Orkney and Shetland, Westmoreland and Lonsdale, Bath, Yeovil, and Norfolk North) Cable was Secretary of State for Business from 2010 to 2015, but unexpectedly lost his seat to the Conservative candidate Tania Mathias in the 2015 general election during the nationwide collapse in the Liberal Democrat vote.

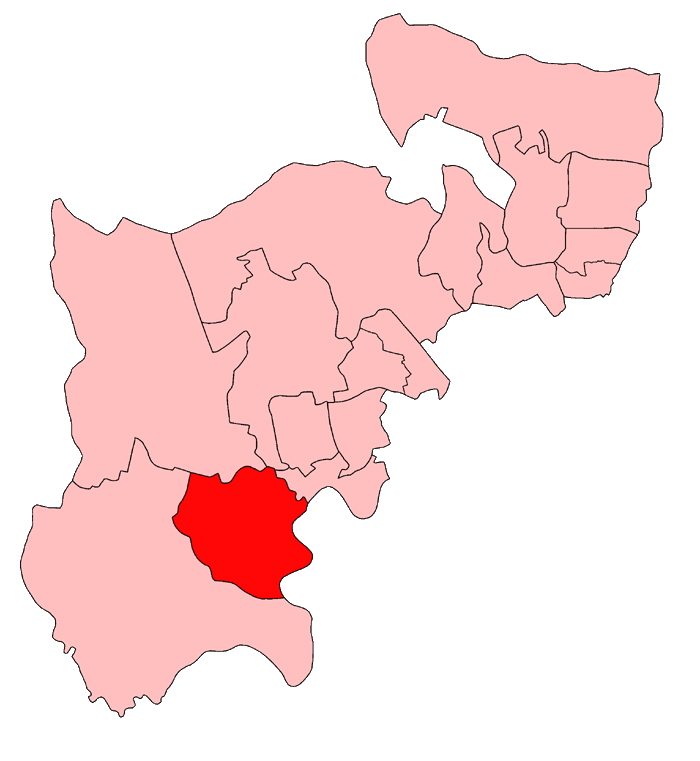
Twickenham in Middlesex, 1918–45

Cable regained the seat in the 2017 snap election by a 14.8% majority and an absolute majority at 52.8% of the vote, which was the highest vote percentage for the Liberal Democrats in any constituency nationally.

In the 21st century, the seat has had notably high turnouts. At the 2015 general election, it had the highest turnout in England and the fourth-highest in the UK. In 2017, turnout was 79.7%, the highest for any seat in the UK, ahead of Oxford West and Abingdon gained by the same party. The seat of Twickenham has also been won by the same party as the neighbouring seat of Kingston and Surbiton in all seven elections they have been in (6 Lib Dem, 1 Conservative).

In December 2023, the Labour Party included the seat in its published list of 211 non-battleground seats, suggesting they did not see it as winnable.

== Boundaries ==
=== Historic ===
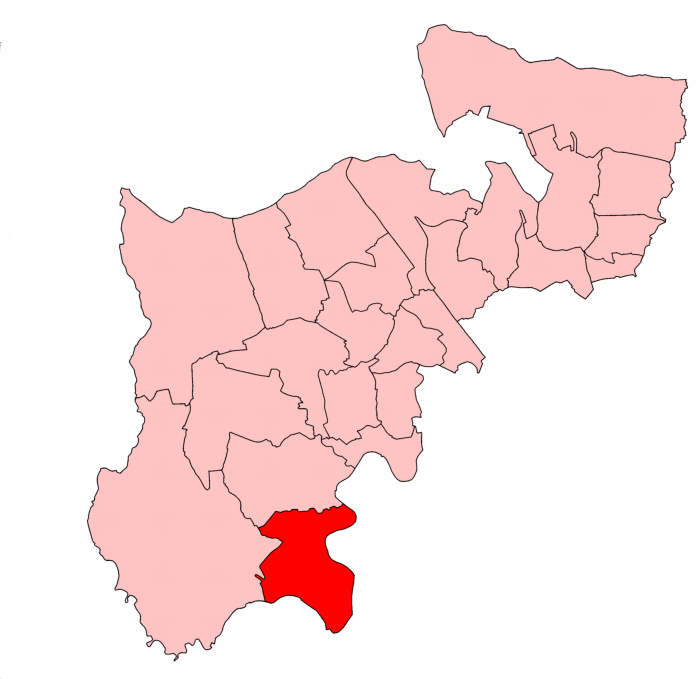
Twickenham, 1945–50

1918–1945: The Urban Districts of Heston and Isleworth, and Twickenham.

1945: boundaries substantially changed – losing territory in the north to form Heston and Isleworth, gaining territory from Spelthorne to the south including Hampton, Teddington, Hampton Wick, Hampton Court Park and Bushy Park

1945–1974: The Municipal Borough of Twickenham.

1974–1983: The London Borough of Richmond upon Thames wards of Central Twickenham, East Twickenham, Hampton, Hampton Hill, Hampton Wick, Heathfield, South Twickenham, Teddington, West Twickenham, and Whitton.

1983–1997: The London Borough of Richmond upon Thames wards of Central Twickenham, Hampton, Hampton Hill, Hampton Nursery, Hampton Wick, Heathfield, South Twickenham, Teddington, West Twickenham, and Whitton.

1997–2010: Central Twickenham, East Twickenham, Hampton, Hampton Hill, Hampton Nursery, Hampton Wick, Heathfield, South Twickenham, Teddington, West Twickenham, and Whitton.

2010–2024: The London Borough of Richmond upon Thames wards of Fulwell and Hampton Hill, Hampton, Hampton North, Hampton Wick, Heathfield, St Margarets and North Twickenham, South Twickenham, Teddington, Twickenham Riverside, West Twickenham, and Whitton.

=== Current ===
Further to the 2023 review of Westminster constituencies, which came into effect for the 2024 general election, the constituency is composed of:

- The London Borough of Richmond upon Thames wards of Fulwell & Hampton Hill, Hampton, Hampton North, Hampton Wick & South Teddington, Heathfield, St Margarets & North Twickenham, South Twickenham, Teddington, Twickenham Riverside, and West Twickenham

The Whitton ward was transferred to Brentford and Isleworth, in order to bring the electorate within the permitted range.

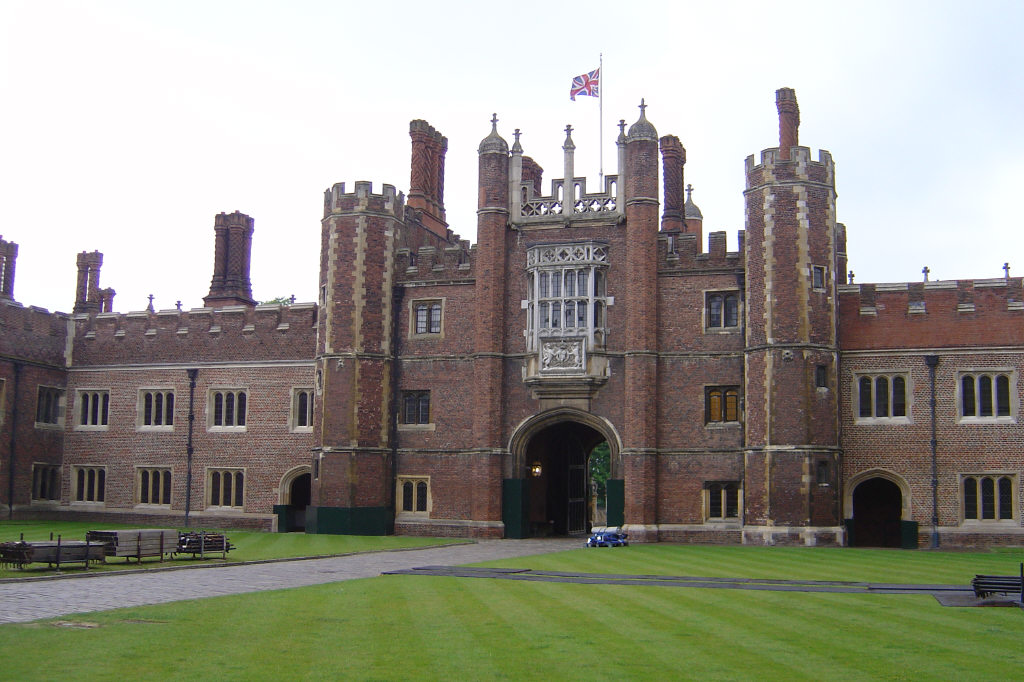
Hampton Court Palace, 2005

The seat covers the majority of the western half of the London Borough of Richmond, that part of the borough on the north bank of the River Thames. (Note: However mostly further south as the river is on a north-south axis at this point) It chiefly contains the towns or London districts of Twickenham, Hampton, and Teddington. Smaller sub-localities by order of commercial activity are Hampton Hill, Hampton Wick, St Margarets, Fulwell, Strawberry Hill and Hampton Court hamlet proper. (Note: An ill-defined but major neighbourhood of East Molesey often self-identifies as and ascribes to itself Hampton Court by virtue of its station and long standing sweep of shops of that name, across historic and actual boundaries, across the Thames in Surrey, this is not part of the Hampton Court hamlet mentioned.) Features includes Hampton Court Palace, Bushy Park (one of the Royal Parks of London), and the Rugby Football Union's national ground, Twickenham Stadium.

=== History of boundaries ===
Map that gives each named seat and any constant electoral success for national (Westminster) elections for Middlesex, 1955 to 1974.

1918–1945

During this period the Hamptons (Hampton, Hampton Hill, Hampton Court and Hampton Wick) and Teddington were excluded from the seat, which instead contained two urban districts to the north of subsequent boundaries, Isleworth and Hounslow, an area at the time with key economic sectors of construction, brewing, warehousing and goods transportation. As such these areas had some support for the Labour Party, who in their best result in the seat, lost the 1929 by-election in the seat by 503 votes (1.6% of the vote).

1945–date

In 1945, the area saw as an unusual corollary to its shift southwards, the swing nationally, of +11.7% (Con-to-Lab) converted in the more strongly middle-class redefined seat to a major cut in the 24% Conservative majority (Note: Also known as one-party swing) swinging −15.3% to a Liberal opponent, George Granville Slack. In February 1974 and from 1979 until seizing victory in 1997, the runner-up party became the Liberal Party or their successor, the Liberal Democrats and the ward boundaries became only slightly adjusted to reflect changes made in the borderlines made at the local level of government.

== Members of Parliament ==
Election	Member	
1918	William Joynson-Hicks	Unionist
1929 by-election	John Ferguson	Unionist
1932 by-election	Hylton Murray-Philipson	Conservative
1934 by-election	Alfred Critchley	Conservative
1935	Edward Keeling	Conservative
1955 by-election	Gresham Cooke	Conservative
1970	Toby Jessel	Conservative
1997	Vince Cable	Liberal Democrats
2015	Tania Mathias	Conservative
2017	Vince Cable	Liberal Democrats
2019	Munira Wilson	Liberal Democrats

== Elections ==
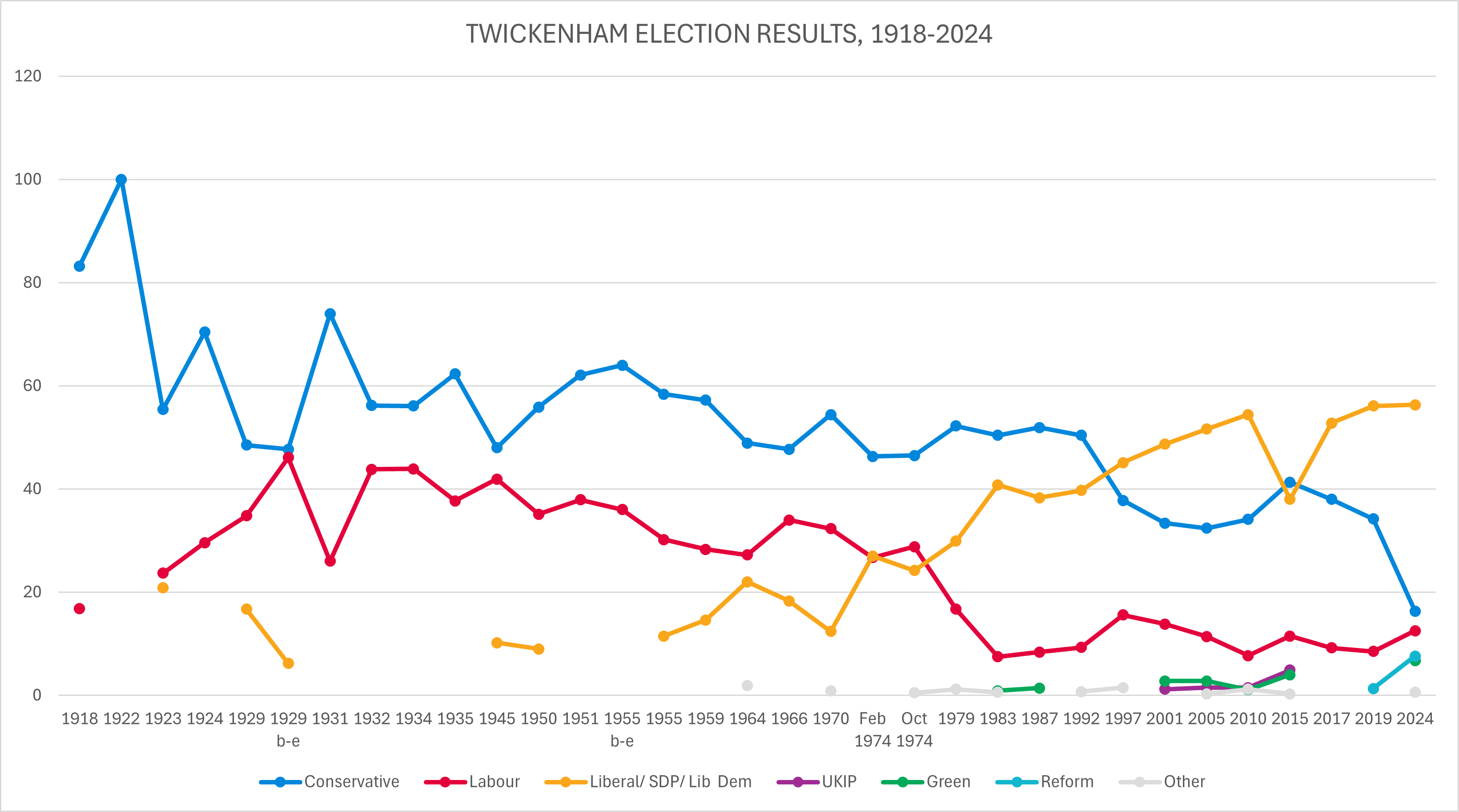
Election results 1918–2024

=== Elections in the 2020s ===
General election 2024: Twickenham
Party	Candidate	Votes	%	±%
Liberal Democrats	Munira Wilson	30,185	56.3	+0.1
Conservative	Jonathan Hulley	8,728	16.3	−17.5
Labour	Tom Bruce	6,693	12.5	+3.8
Reform	Alexander Starling	4,092	7.6	+6.3
Green	Chantal Kerr-Sheppard	3,590	6.7	New
Workers Party	Umair Malik	347	0.6	New
Majority		21,457	40.0	+17.6
Turnout		53,635	71.5	−5.4
Registered electors		74,980		
Liberal Democrats hold		Swing	+8.8	

=== Elections in the 2010s ===
2019 notional result
Party	Vote	%
Liberal Democrats	32,816	56.2
Conservative	19,742	33.8
Labour	5,051	8.7
Brexit Party	743	1.3
Turnout	58,352	76.9
Electorate	75,889	

General election 2019: Twickenham
Party	Candidate	Votes	%	±%
Liberal Democrats	Munira Wilson	36,166	56.1	+3.3
Conservative	Isobel Grant	22,045	34.2	−3.8
Labour	Ranjeev Walia	5,476	8.5	−0.7
Brexit Party	Stuart Wells	816	1.3	New
Majority		14,121	21.9	+7.1
Turnout		64,503	76.3	−3.2
Registered electors		84,906		
Liberal Democrats hold		Swing	+3.6	

This was the second largest Lib Dem majority by percentage, after Bath and the largest by number. It was also their largest vote share at the 2019 general election.

General election 2017: Twickenham
Party	Candidate	Votes	%	±%
Liberal Democrats	Vince Cable	34,969	52.8	+14.8
Conservative	Tania Mathias	25,207	38.0	−3.3
Labour	Katherine Dunne	6,114	9.2	−2.3
Majority		9,762	14.8	N/A
Turnout		66,290	79.5	+2.2
Registered electors		83,362		
Liberal Democrats gain from Conservative		Swing	+9.0	

General election 2015: Twickenham
Party	Candidate	Votes	%	±%
Conservative	Tania Mathias	25,580	41.3	+7.2
Liberal Democrats	Vince Cable	23,563	38.0	−16.4
Labour	Nick Grant	7,129	11.5	+3.8
UKIP	Barry Edwards	3,069	4.9	+3.4
Green	Tanya Williams	2,463	4.0	+2.9
Christian	Dominic Stockford	174	0.3	New
Magna Carta	David Wedgwood	26	0.0	New
Majority		2,017	3.3	N/A
Turnout		62,004	77.3	+2.5
Registered electors		80,250		
Conservative gain from Liberal Democrats		Swing	+11.8	

General election 2010: Twickenham
Party	Candidate	Votes	%	±%
Liberal Democrats	Vince Cable	32,483	54.4	+2.7
Conservative	Deborah Thomas	20,343	34.1	+1.7
Labour	Brian Tomlinson	4,583	7.7	−3.7
UKIP	Brian Gilbert	868	1.5	0.0
Green	Stephen Roest	674	1.1	−1.7
BNP	Chris Hurst	654	1.1	New
Citizens for Undead Rights and Equality	Harry Cole	76	0.1	New
Magna Carta	Paul Armstrong	40	0.0	New
Majority		12,140	20.3	+1.0
Turnout		59,721	74.8	+2.4
Registered electors		80,569		
Liberal Democrats hold		Swing	+0.5	

=== Elections in the 2000s ===
General election 2005: Twickenham
Party	Candidate	Votes	%	±%
Liberal Democrats	Vince Cable	26,696	51.6	+2.9
Conservative	Paul Maynard	16,731	32.4	−1.0
Labour	Brian Whitington	5,868	11.4	−2.4
Green	Henry Leveson-Gower	1,445	2.8	0.0
UKIP	Douglas Orchard	766	1.5	+0.3
Independent	Brian Gibert	117	0.2	New
Rainbow Dream Ticket	George Weiss	64	0.1	New
Majority		9,965	19.2	+3.9
Turnout		51,687	71.8	+5.4
Registered electors		71,444		
Liberal Democrats hold		Swing	+2.0	

General election 2001: Twickenham
Party	Candidate	Votes	%	±%
Liberal Democrats	Vince Cable	24,344	48.7	+3.6
Conservative	Nicholas Longworth	16,689	33.4	−4.4
Labour	Dean Rogers	6,903	13.8	−1.8
Green	Judith Maciejowska	1,423	2.8	New
UKIP	Ray Hollebone	579	1.2	New
Majority		7,655	15.3	+8.0
Turnout		49,938	66.4	−12.9
Registered electors		72,225		
Liberal Democrats hold		Swing	+4.0	

=== Elections in the 1990s ===
General election 1997: Twickenham
Party	Candidate	Votes	%	±%
Liberal Democrats	Vince Cable	26,237	45.1	+5.8
Conservative	Toby Jessel	21,956	37.8	−11.8
Labour	Eva Tutchell	9,065	15.6	+5.2
Independent English Conservative and Referendum	Jane Harrison	589	1.0	New
Rainbow Dream Ticket	Terence Haggar	155	0.3	New
Natural Law	Anthony Hardy	142	0.2	−0.1
Majority		4,281	7.3	N/A
Turnout		58,144	79.3	−4.9
Registered electors		73,569		
Liberal Democrats gain from Conservative		Swing	+8.8	

General election 1992: Twickenham
Party	Candidate	Votes	%	±%
Conservative	Toby Jessel	26,804	50.4	−1.5
Liberal Democrats	Vince Cable	21,093	39.7	+1.4
Labour	Michael Gold	4,919	9.3	+0.9
Natural Law	Gary Gill	152	0.3	New
Democratic Liberal and Conservatives	D Griffith	103	0.2	New
Liberal	A Miners	85	0.2	New
Majority		5,711	10.7	−2.8
Turnout		53,156	84.2	+2.7
Registered electors		63,072		
Conservative hold		Swing	−1.5	

=== Elections in the 1980s ===
General election 1987: Twickenham
Party	Candidate	Votes	%	±%
Conservative	Toby Jessel	27,331	51.9	+1.5
Liberal (Alliance)	John Waller	20,204	38.3	−2.5
Labour	Valerie Vaz	4,415	8.4	+0.9
Green	David Batchelor	746	1.4	+0.5
Majority		7,127	13.6	+4.0
Turnout		52,696	81.5	+3.7
Registered electors		64,661		
Conservative hold		Swing	+0.5	

General election 1983: Twickenham
Party	Candidate	Votes	%	±%
Conservative	Toby Jessel	25,110	50.4	−1.8
Liberal (Alliance)	John Waller	20,318	40.8	+10.9
Labour	Patricia Nicholas	3,732	7.5	−9.2
Ecology	John J. Clarke	424	0.9	New
National Front	T.J. Denville-Faulkner	234	0.5	−0.7
Independent	R.W. Kenyon	40	0.1	New
Majority		4,792	9.6	−12.7
Turnout		49,858	77.8	−2.5
Registered electors		64,116		
Conservative hold		Swing	-7.0	

=== Elections in the 1970s ===
General election 1979: Twickenham
Party	Candidate	Votes	%	±%
Conservative	Toby Jessel	30,017	52.2	+5.7
Liberal	John Waller	17,169	29.9	+5.7
Labour	David Wetzel	9,591	16.7	−12.1
National Front	Martin Braithwaite	686	1.2	New
Majority		12,848	22.3	+4.6
Turnout		57,463	80.3	+5.9
Registered electors		71,535		
Conservative hold		Swing		

General election October 1974: Twickenham
Party	Candidate	Votes	%	±%
Conservative	Toby Jessel	24,959	46.5	+0.2
Labour	Mavis Cunningham	15,452	28.8	+2.1
Liberal	Stephen Kramer	13,021	24.2	−2.8
Anti EEC	W. Burgess	287	0.5	New
Majority		9,507	17.7	−1.6
Turnout		53,719	74.4	−8.7
Registered electors		72,210		
Conservative hold		Swing		

General election February 1974: Twickenham
Party	Candidate	Votes	%	±%
Conservative	Toby Jessel	27,595	46.3	−8.1
Liberal	Stephen Kramer	16,092	27.0	+14.6
Labour	Ronald M. Taylor	15,909	26.7	−5.6
Majority		11,503	19.3	−2.8
Turnout		59,596	83.1	+12.2
Registered electors		71,682		
Conservative hold		Swing		

General election 1970: Twickenham
Party	Candidate	Votes	%	±%
Conservative	Toby Jessel	28,571	54.4	+6.7
Labour	John H.W. Grant	16,950	32.3	−1.7
Liberal	David Kenneth Rebak	6,516	12.4	−5.9
Independent	Richard Franklin	462	0.9	New
Majority		11,621	22.1	+8.4
Turnout		52,499	70.9	−7.7
Registered electors		74,038		
Conservative hold		Swing		

=== Elections in the 1960s ===
General election 1966: Twickenham
Party	Candidate	Votes	%	±%
Conservative	Gresham Cooke	26,512	47.7	−1.2
Labour	David Carlton	18,884	34.0	+6.8
Liberal	Simon Goldblatt	10,160	18.3	−3.7
Majority		7,628	13.7	−8.1
Turnout		55,556	78.6	+0.9
Registered electors		70,675		
Conservative hold		Swing		

General election 1964: Twickenham
Party	Candidate	Votes	%	±%
Conservative	Gresham Cooke	27,427	48.9	−8.3
Labour	W Eric Wolff	15,231	27.2	−1.1
Liberal	John Woolfe	12,306	22.0	+7.4
Nuclear Disarmament	Michael H. Craft	1,073	1.9	New
Majority		12,196	21.7	−7.2
Turnout		56,037	77.7	−2.1
Registered electors		72,154		
Conservative hold		Swing		

=== Elections in the 1950s ===
General election 1959: Twickenham
Party	Candidate	Votes	%	±%
Conservative	Gresham Cooke	33,677	57.2	−1.2
Labour	Anne Kerr	16,638	28.3	−1.9
Liberal	Kenwyn Arthur Powell	8,589	14.6	+3.1
Majority		17,039	28.9	+0.7
Turnout		58,904	79.8	+2.8
Registered electors		73,852		
Conservative hold		Swing		

General election 1955: Twickenham
Party	Candidate	Votes	%	±%
Conservative	Gresham Cooke	33,726	58.4	−2.7
Labour	Pat O'Gorman	17,450	30.2	−7.7
Liberal	Margaret Neilson	6,626	11.5	New
Majority		16,276	28.2	+4.0
Turnout		57,802	77.0	−4.3
Registered electors		75,106		
Conservative hold		Swing		

1955 Twickenham by-election
Party	Candidate	Votes	%	±%
Conservative	Gresham Cooke	23,075	64.0	+1.9
Labour	R. P. Pitman	12,953	36.0	−1.9
Majority		10,122	28.0	+3.8
Turnout		36,028	47.3	−38.4
Registered electors		76,147		
Conservative hold		Swing	−1.9	

General election 1951: Twickenham
Party	Candidate	Votes	%	±%
Conservative	Edward Keeling	39,080	62.1	+6.2
Labour	Ethel Chipchase	23,871	37.9	+2.8
Majority		15,209	24.2	+3.4
Turnout		62,951	81.3	−4.4
Registered electors		77,444		
Conservative hold		Swing		

General election 1950: Twickenham
Party	Candidate	Votes	%	±%
Conservative	Edward Keeling	36,757	55.9	+7.9
Labour	John Stonehouse	23,088	35.1	−6.8
Liberal	Derek Alan Forwood	5,950	9.0	−1.2
Majority		13,669	20.8	+14.7
Turnout		65,795	85.7	+11.7
Registered electors		76,810		
Conservative hold		Swing		

=== Elections in the 1940s ===
General election 1945: Twickenham
Party	Candidate	Votes	%	±%
Conservative	Edward Keeling	26,045	48.0	−15.3
Labour	Arthur Irvine	22,736	41.9	+4.2
Liberal	Granville Slack	5,509	10.2	New
Majority		3,309	6.1	−18.5
Turnout		54,290	74.0	+7.5
Registered electors		73,336		
Conservative hold		Swing		

=== Elections in the 1930s ===
General election 1935: Twickenham
Party	Candidate	Votes	%	±%
Conservative	Edward Keeling	37,635	62.3	−11.7
Labour Co-op	Percy Holman	22,823	37.7	+11.7
Majority		14,812	24.6	−23.4
Turnout		60,458	66.5	−4.8
Registered electors		90,929		
Conservative hold		Swing		

1934 Twickenham by-election
Party	Candidate	Votes	%	±%
Conservative	Alfred Critchley	23,395	56.1	−0.1
Labour Co-op	Percy Holman	19,890	43.9	+0.1
Majority		5,505	12.2	−0.2
Turnout		43,285	55.5	+3.6
Registered electors		81,529		
Conservative hold		Swing	−0.1	

1932 Twickenham by-election
Party	Candidate	Votes	%	±%
Conservative	Hylton Murray-Philipson	21,688	56.2	−17.8
Labour Co-op	Percy Holman	16,881	43.8	+17.8
Majority		4,807	12.4	−35.6
Turnout		38,569	51.9	−19.4
Registered electors		74,272		
Conservative hold		Swing	−17.8	

General election 1931: Twickenham
Party	Candidate	Votes	%	±%
Conservative	John Ferguson	39,161	74.0	+26.3
Labour Co-op	Percy Holman	13,763	26.0	−20.1
Majority		25,398	48.0	+46.4
Turnout		42,954	71.3	+21.8
Registered electors		74,272		
Conservative hold		Swing	+23.2	

=== Elections in the 1920s ===
1929 Twickenham by-election
Party	Candidate	Votes	%	±%
Unionist	John Ferguson	14,705	47.7	−0.8
Labour	Thomas Jackson Mason	14,202	46.1	+11.3
Liberal	Frederick Paterson	1,920	6.2	−10.5
Majority		503	1.6	−12.1
Turnout		30,827	49.5	−20.3
Registered electors		62,264		
Unionist hold		Swing	−6.6	

General election 1929: Twickenham
Party	Candidate	Votes	%	±%
Unionist	William Joynson-Hicks	21,087	48.5	−21.9
Labour	Thomas Jackson Mason	15,121	34.8	+5.2
Liberal	Frederick Paterson	7,246	16.7	New
Majority		5,966	13.7	−27.1
Turnout		43,454	69.8	−0.2
Registered electors		62,263		
Unionist hold		Swing	−13.6	

General election 1924: Twickenham
Party	Candidate	Votes	%	±%
Unionist	William Joynson-Hicks	18,889	70.4	+15.0
Labour	Stanley Simon Sherman	7,945	29.6	+5.9
Majority		10,944	40.8	+9.1
Turnout		26,834	70.0	+8.0
Registered electors		38,353		
Unionist hold		Swing	+4.6	

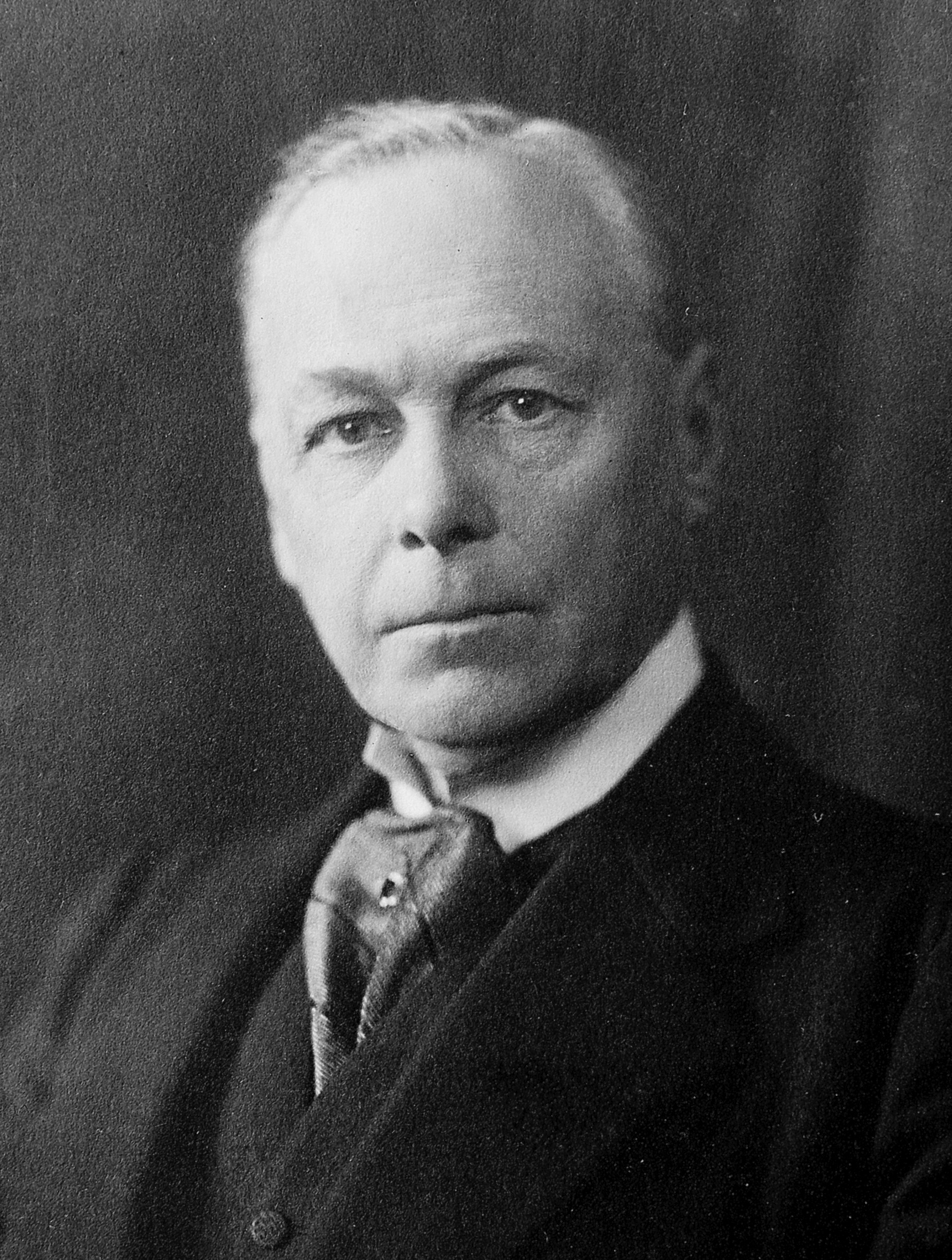
Joynson-Hicks

General election 1923: Twickenham
Party	Candidate	Votes	%	±%
Unionist	William Joynson-Hicks	12,903	55.4	N/A
Labour	Stanley Simon Sherman	5,509	23.7	New
Liberal	Charles Baker	4,858	20.9	New
Majority		7,394	31.7	N/A
Turnout		23,270	62.0	N/A
Registered electors		37,558		
Unionist hold		Swing	N/A	

General election 1922: Twickenham
Party	Candidate	Votes	%	±%
Unionist	William Joynson-Hicks	Unopposed		
Unionist hold				

=== Elections in the 1910s ===
General election 1918: Twickenham
Party		Candidate	Votes	%
C	Unionist	William Joynson-Hicks	14,015	83.2
	Labour	Humphrey Chalmers	2,823	16.8
Majority			11,192	66.4
Turnout			16,838	48.2
Registered electors			34,924	
	Unionist win (new seat)			
C indicates candidate endorsed by the coalition government.

== See also ==
- List of parliamentary constituencies in London
- 1929 Twickenham by-election
- 1932 Twickenham by-election
- 1934 Twickenham by-election
- 1955 Twickenham by-election

== Sources ==
- Boundary Commission for England
- Leigh Rayment's Historical List of MPs – Constituencies beginning with "T" (part 2)
- Craig, F. W. S. (1983) [1969]. British parliamentary election results 1918–1949 (3rd ed.). Chichester: Parliamentary Research Services. ISBN 0-900178-06-X.
