= 2026 London local elections =

- 7 May 2026

All 1,817 councillors in all 32 London boroughs, and 5 directly-elected mayors
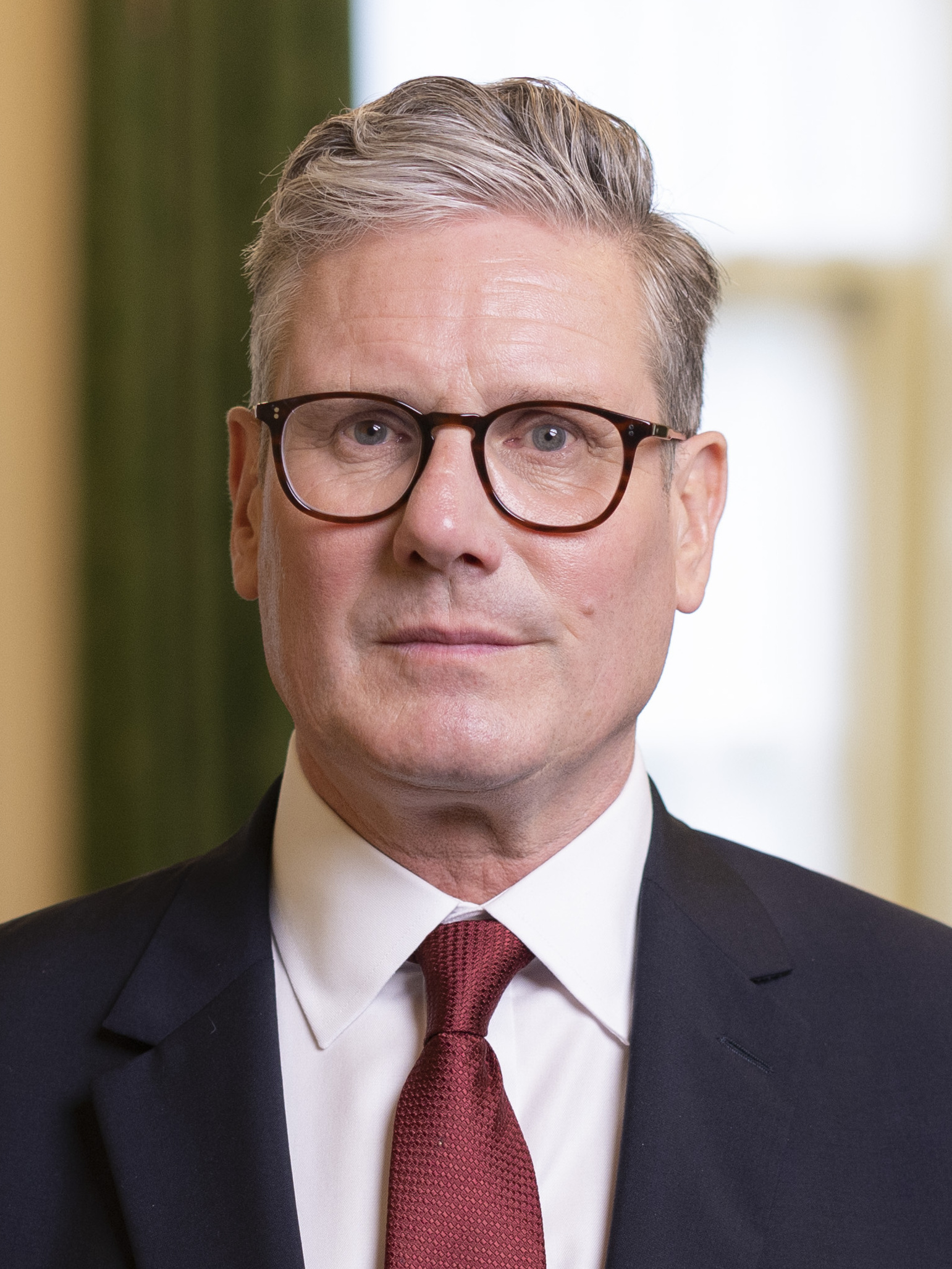

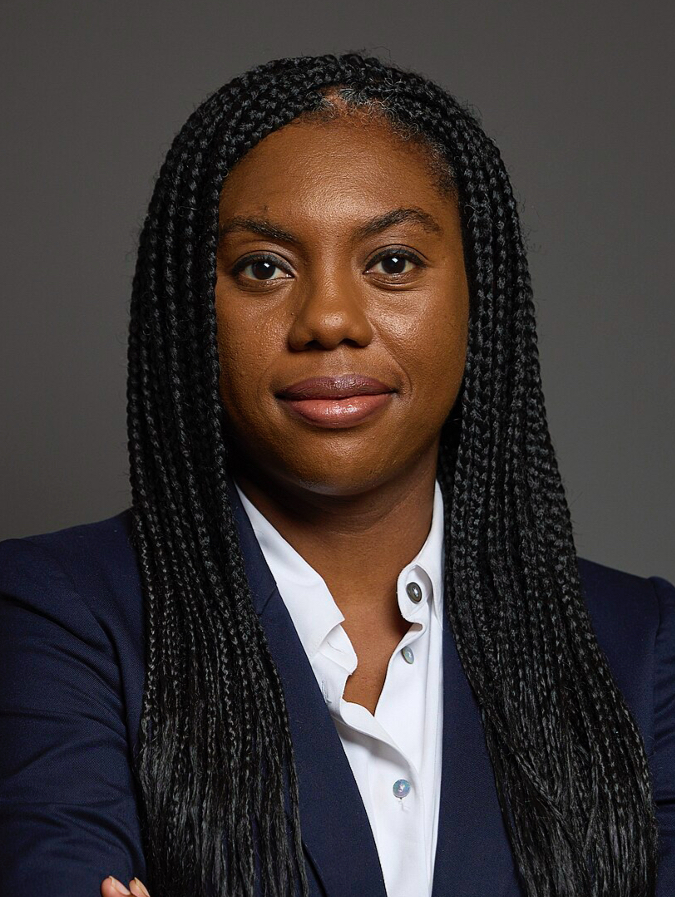

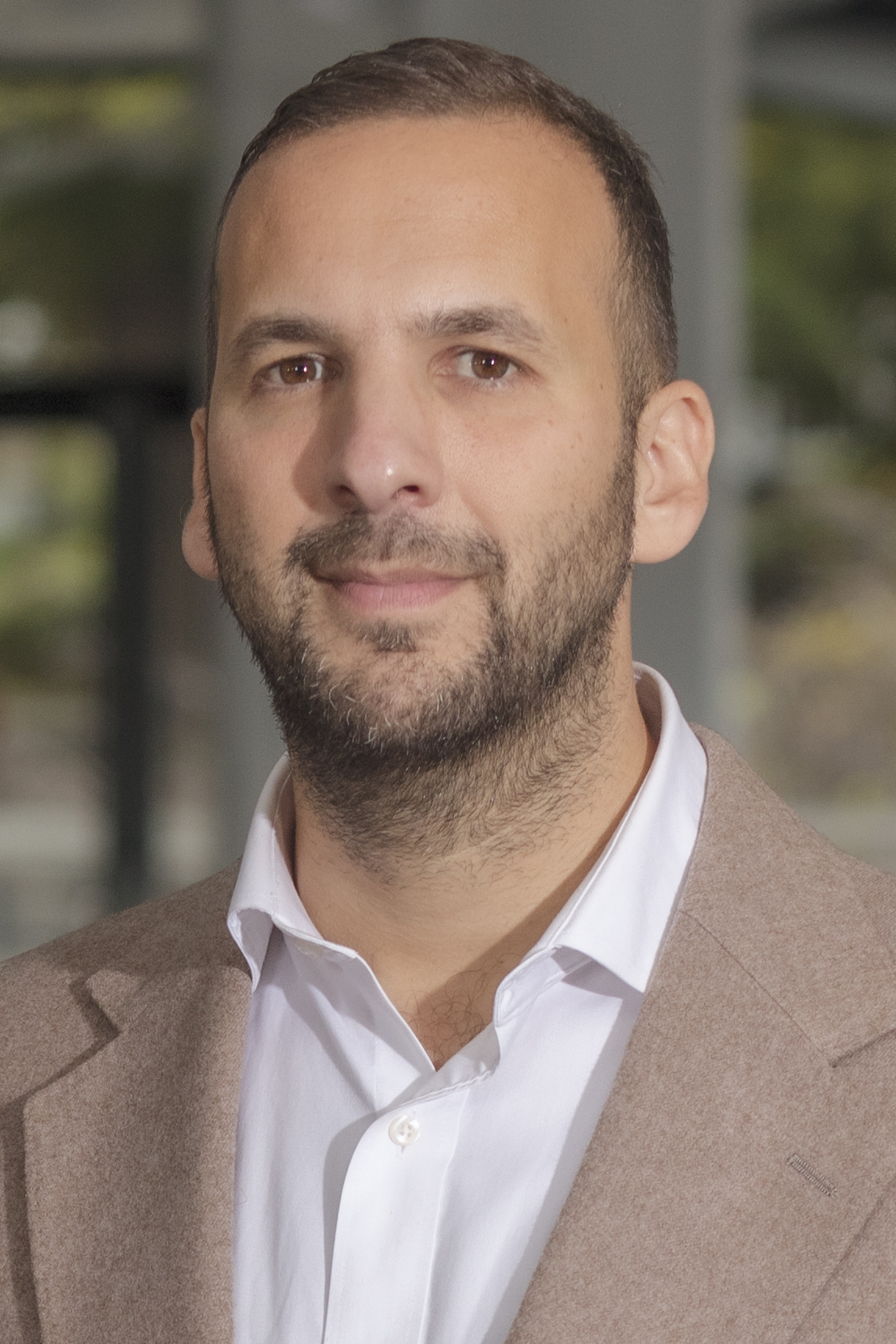

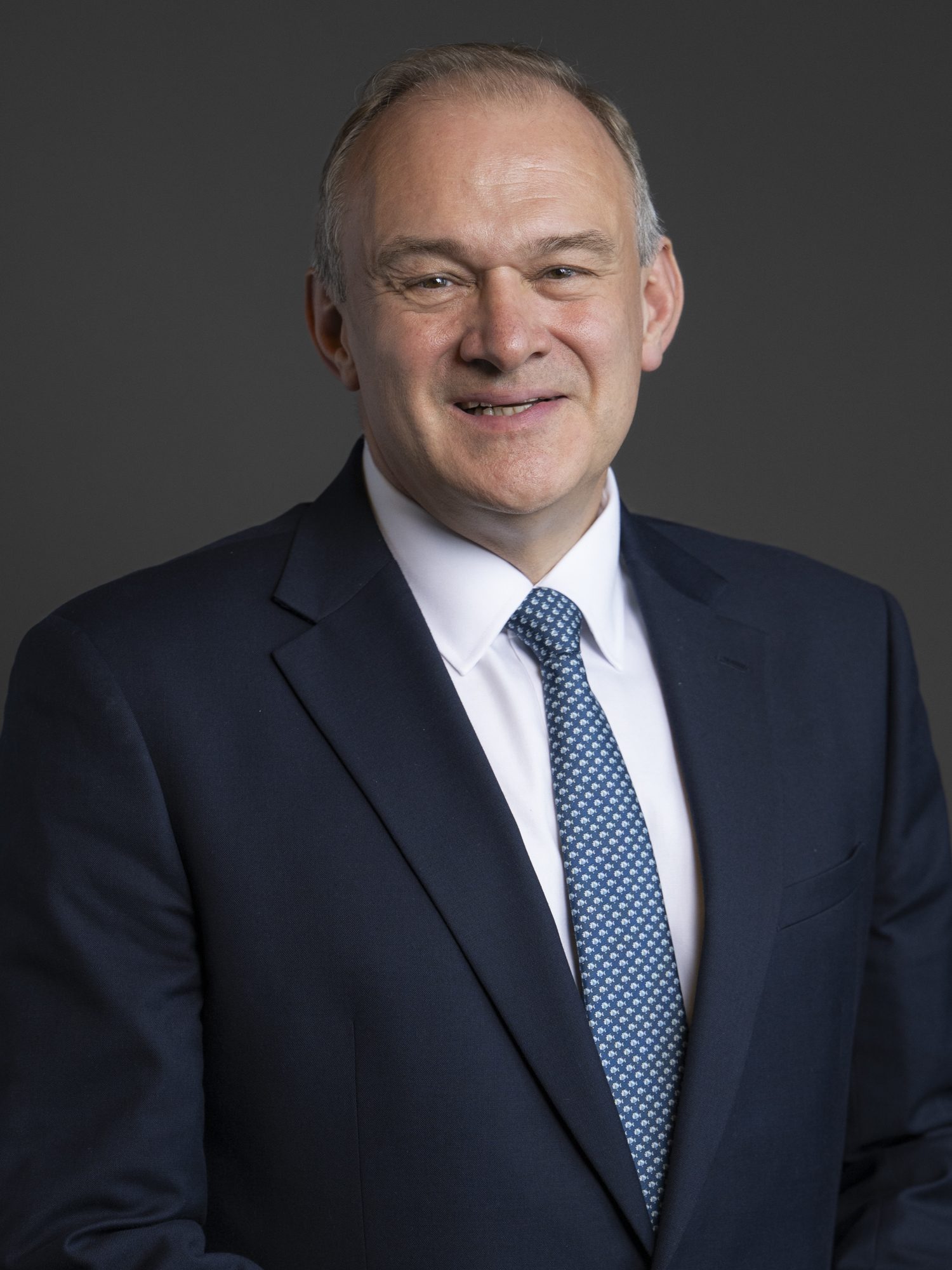

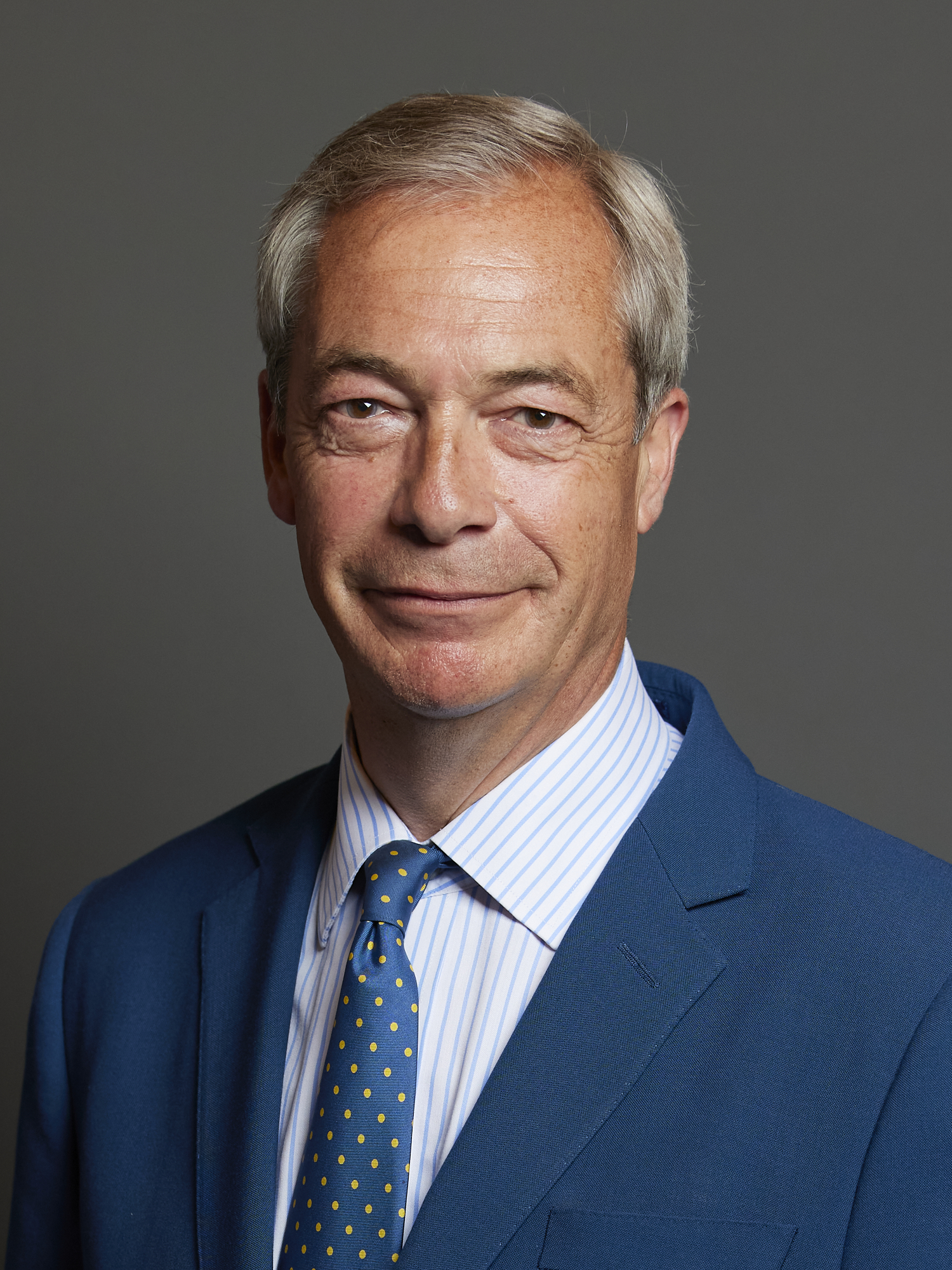
	First party	Second party	Third party
Leader	Keir Starmer	Kemi Badenoch	Zack Polanski
Party	Labour	Conservative	Green
Last election	1,156 seats, 40.3%	404 seats, 24.8%	18 seats, 11.4%
Seats won	696 seats 9 councils	409 seats 6 councils	279 seats 3 councils
Seat change	▼460 ▼12 councils	▲5 ▲1 council	▲261 ▲3 councils
Percentage	25.6%	20.0%	22.3%
Swing	▼16.9%	▼4.8%	▲10.5%
Mayors	1	1	2
Mayors +/–	▼2	Steady	▲2
	Fourth party	Fifth party
Leader	Ed Davey	Nigel Farage
Party	Liberal Democrats	Reform UK
Last election	180 seats, 13.8%	0 seats, 0.16%
Seats won	243 seats 3 councils	79 seats 1 council
Seat change	▲63; 0 councils	▲79 ▲1 council
Percentage	12.4%	13.0%
Swing	▼1.9%	▲12.8%

Local elections in London were held on 7 May 2026, as part of the 2026 United Kingdom local elections. All London borough councillor seats were up for election.

The election saw major losses for the Labour Party, major gains for the London Green Party, and minor gains for Reform UK, Liberal Democrats and the Conservatives. The Labour Party saw its worst results in London local elections since 1968, while the London Green Party and Reform UK had their best ever results, gaining 278 and 79 seats respectively. The London Green Party have also gained 2 directly-elected mayors in Hackney and Lewisham, Zoë Garbett and Liam Shrivastava.

== Background ==
In the 2022 London local elections, Labour gained Westminster, Wandsworth and Barnet councils. In the 2024 United Kingdom general election, most of the constituencies in London elected Labour MPs.

In January 2026, BBC News reported that the Green Party of England and Wales and Reform UK were seeking to make gains in the capital. The elections were expected to be tough for Labour who controlled most of the councils in London. Pollsters suggested that Labour might be fighting on five fronts against the Conservatives, Reform UK, Liberal Democrats, Greens and pro-Gaza independents.

In March 2026, LSE Professor of Local Government Tony Travers said Labour could face a "political earthquake" in the London local elections, worse than their loss in the Gorton and Denton by-election. He said Labour, which had plummeted in the polls, risked losing over 600 seats (more than half of their total of 1,150) and the Conservatives, who won more than 400 seats in 2022, could fall to a new historic low, with the Greens and Reform being the main beneficiaries.

== Councils ==
Council	Seats	Party control		Details
Council	Seats	Previous	New	Details
Barking and Dagenham	51	Labour	Labour	Details
Barnet	63	Labour	No overall control (Labour minority)	Details
Bexley	45	Conservative	Conservative	Details
Brent	57	Labour	No overall control (Labour minority)	Details
Bromley	58	Conservative	Conservative	Details
Camden	55	Labour	Labour	Details
Croydon	70	No overall control (Conservative minority)	No overall control (Conservative minority)	Details
Ealing	70	Labour	Labour	Details
Enfield	63	Labour	No overall control (Conservative minority)	Details
Greenwich	55	Labour	Labour	Details
Hackney	57	Labour	Green	Details
Hammersmith and Fulham	50	Labour	Labour	Details
Haringey	57	Labour	No overall control (Green minority)	Details
Harrow	55	Conservative	Conservative	Details
Havering	55	No overall control (HRA/Labour coalition)	Reform	Details
Hillingdon	53	Conservative	Conservative	Details
Hounslow	62	Labour	Labour	Details
Islington	51	Labour	Labour	Details
Kensington and Chelsea	50	Conservative	Conservative	Details
Kingston upon Thames	48	Liberal Democrats	Liberal Democrats	Details
Lambeth	63	Labour	No overall control (Green minority w/ Lib Dem support)	Details
Lewisham	54	Labour	Green	Details
Merton	57	Labour	Labour	Details
Newham	66	Labour	No overall control (Labour minority)	Details
Redbridge	63	Labour	Labour	Details
Richmond upon Thames	54	Liberal Democrats	Liberal Democrats	Details
Southwark	63	Labour	No overall control (Green-Lib Dem coalition)	Details
Sutton	55	Liberal Democrats	Liberal Democrats	Details
Tower Hamlets	45	Aspire	Aspire	Details
Waltham Forest	60	Labour	Green	Details
Wandsworth	58	Labour	No overall control (Conservative minority)	Details
Westminster	54	Labour	Conservative	Details
All 32 councils	1,817			

=== Councillor comparison with 2022 ===
The table below shows the number of councillors by party for each council in London. The shaded cells show the party or parties in each council's governing administration.

Council	Elected in 2022					Prior to 2026 election							Elected in 2026					
Council	Lab	Con	Lib Dem	Green	Others	Lab	Con	Lib Dem	Green	Reform	Ind	Others	Lab	Con	Lib Dem	Green	Reform	Others
Barking and Dagenham	51	0	0	0	0	47	1	0	3	0	1	0	38	0	0	4	9	0
Barnet	41	22	0	0	0	40	19	0	1	1	1	0	31	31	0	1	0	0
Bexley	12	33	0	0	0	12	30	0	0	0	3	0	9	29	0	0	7	0
Brent	49	5	3	0	0	42	6	3	5	0	1	0	26	11	11	9	0	0
Bromley	12	36	5	0	5 Chislehurst Matters: 3 Independent: 2	11	33	5	0	3	2	3 Chislehurst Matters: 3	8	35	6	0	6	3 Chislehurst Matters: 3
Camden	47	3	4	1	0	45	3	6	1	0	0	0	30	3	10	11	0	1
Croydon	34	33 (Note: Led by a Conservative Mayor)	1	2	0	34	33	1	2	0	0	0	30	28	2	8	2	0
Ealing	59	5	6	0	0	59	4	7	0	0	1	0	46	5	13	5	0	1
Enfield	38	25	0	0	0	35	25	0	0	0	3	0	27	31	0	5	0	0
Greenwich	52	3	0	0	0	47	4	0	2	0	2	0	35	6	0	13	1	0
Hackney	50	5	0	2	0	42	6	0	4	0	5	0	9	6	0	42	0	0
Hammersmith and Fulham	40	10	0	0	0	36	10	0	2	0	1	0	38	12	0	0	0	0
Haringey	50	0	7	0	0	43	0	7	2	0	5	0	21	0	8	28	0	0
Harrow	24	31	0	0	0	23	31	0	0	0	1	0	12	42	0	0	0	1 Arise: 1
Havering	9	23	0	0	23 Havering Residents Association: 20 (Note: Led by a Havering Residents Association and Labour coalition); Harold Hill Independent: 3	8	16	0	0	1	2	28 Havering Residents Association: 25 (Note: Havering Residents Association minority administration); Harold Wood Hill Park Residents Association: 3	2	0	0	0	39	14 Havering Residents Association: 11; Harold Wood Hill Park Residents Association: 3
Hillingdon	23	30	0	0	0	16	30	0	1	0	5	0	16	32	0	1	4	0
Hounslow	52	10	0	0	0	43	10	0	1	0	6	0	32	17	1	3	8	1
Islington	48	0	0	3	0	44	0	0	3	0	4	0	32	0	0	19	0	0
Kensington and Chelsea	13	35	2	0	0	7	36	2	1	0	4	0	13	34	3	0	0	0
Kingston upon Thames	0	3	44	0	1 Kingston Independent Residents Group: 1	0	2	42	0	0	0	4 Kingston Independent Residents Group: 4	0	2	44	0	0	2 Kingston Independent Residents Group: 2
Lambeth	58	0	3	2	0	55	0	4	4	0	1	0	26	0	8	29	0	0
Lewisham	54	0	0	0	0	50	0	0	4	0	0	0	14	0	0	40	0	0
Merton	31	7	17	0	2 Merton Park Ward Independent Residents: 2	30	7	16	0	0	1	2 Merton Park Ward Independent Residents: 2	32	4	19	0	0	2 Merton Park Ward Independent Residents: 2
Newham	64	0	0	2	0	56	0	0	3	0	3	4 Newham Independents: 4	26	0	0	16	0	24 Newham Independents: 24
Redbridge	58	5	0	0	0	54	5	0	0	0	4	0	43	5	0	5	1	9 Redbridge Independents: 9
Richmond upon Thames	0	1	48	5	0	0	0	49	5	0	0	0	0	0	54	0	0	0
Southwark	52	0	11	0	0	45	0	11	4	0	3	0	29	0	12	22	0	0
Sutton	3	20	29	0	3 Independent: 3	2	21	29	0	0	0	3 Sutton Independent Residents Group: 3	1	0	51	0	2	1 Independent: 1
Tower Hamlets	19	1	0	1	24 Aspire: 24	16	1	0	1	0	5	22 Aspire: 22	5	1	1	5	0	33 Aspire: 33
Waltham Forest	47	13	0	0	0	45	12	0	0	1	2	0	15	14	0	31	0	0
Wandsworth	35	22	0	0	1 Independent: 1	34	21	0	0	1	2	0	28	29	0	0	0	1 Independent: 1
Westminster	31	23	0	0	0	28	24	0	0	2	0	0	22	32	0	0	0	0
Total	1,156	404	180	18	59	1,046	386	181	47	13	70	66	696	409	243	297	79	93

== Mayors ==
Council	Mayor before	Elected mayor	Details
Croydon	Jason Perry (Con)	Jason Perry (Con)	Details
Hackney	Caroline Woodley (Lab)	Zoë Garbett (Grn)	Details
Lewisham	Brenda Dacres (Labour Co-op)	Liam Shrivastava (Grn)	Details
Newham	Rokhsana Fiaz (Labour Co-op)	Forhad Hussain (Lab)	Details
Tower Hamlets	Lutfur Rahman (Aspire)	Lutfur Rahman (Aspire)	Details

== Opinion polls ==
Date(s) conducted	Pollster	Client	Sample size	Area	Lab	Con	LD	Grn	Ref	Others	Lead
7 May 2026	2026 local elections				25.6%	20.0%	12.4%	22.3%	13.0%	6.7%	3.3
7–29 Apr 2026	More in Common (MRP)	n/a	2,646	London	28%	17%	14%	20%	15%	6%	8
27 Mar – 1 Apr 2026	YouGov (MRP)	n/a	4,548	London	26%	17%	15%	22%	14%	6%	4
4 July 2024	2024 General Election in London				43.0%	20.5%	11.0%	10.0%	8.7%	6.7%	22.5
5 May 2022	2022 local elections				42.5%	25.8%	14.3%	11.8%	0.2%	5.4%	16.7

=== Seat projections ===
Date(s) conducted	Pollster	Client	Sample size	Area	Lab	Con	LD	Grn	Ref	Others
7 May 2026	2026 local elections				696	407	243	279	79	113
March 2026	Bombe	n/a	TBD	London	306	464	253	575	145	75
5 May 2022	2022 local elections				1,156	404	180	18	0	59

== Ward result maps ==
=== London-wide ===
Map showing the control of each council

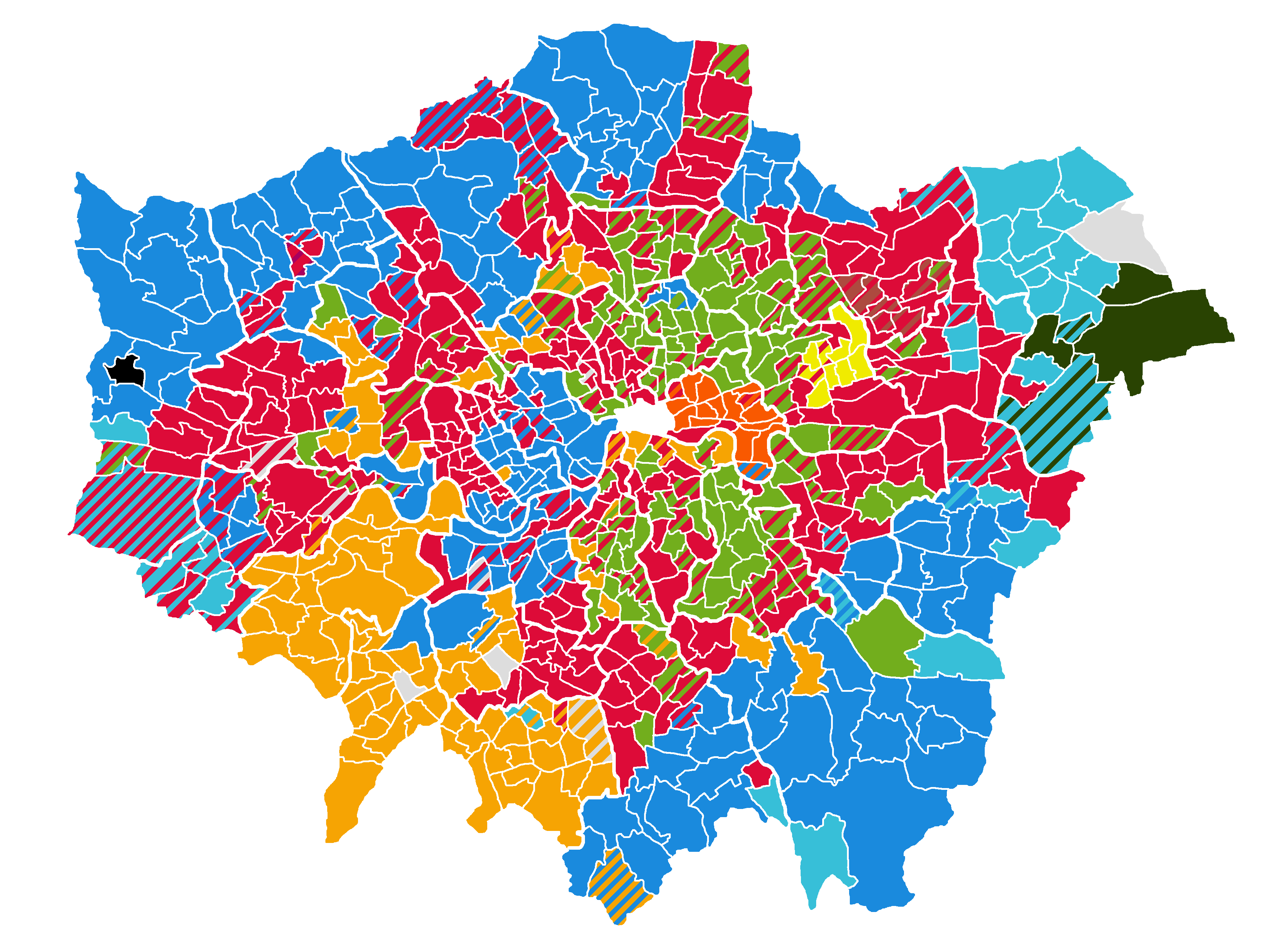
Map showing the control of each ward

=== By borough ===
Barking and Dagenham 2026 results map

Barnet 2026 results map

Bexley 2026 results map

Brent 2026 results map

Bromley 2026 results map

Camden 2026 results map

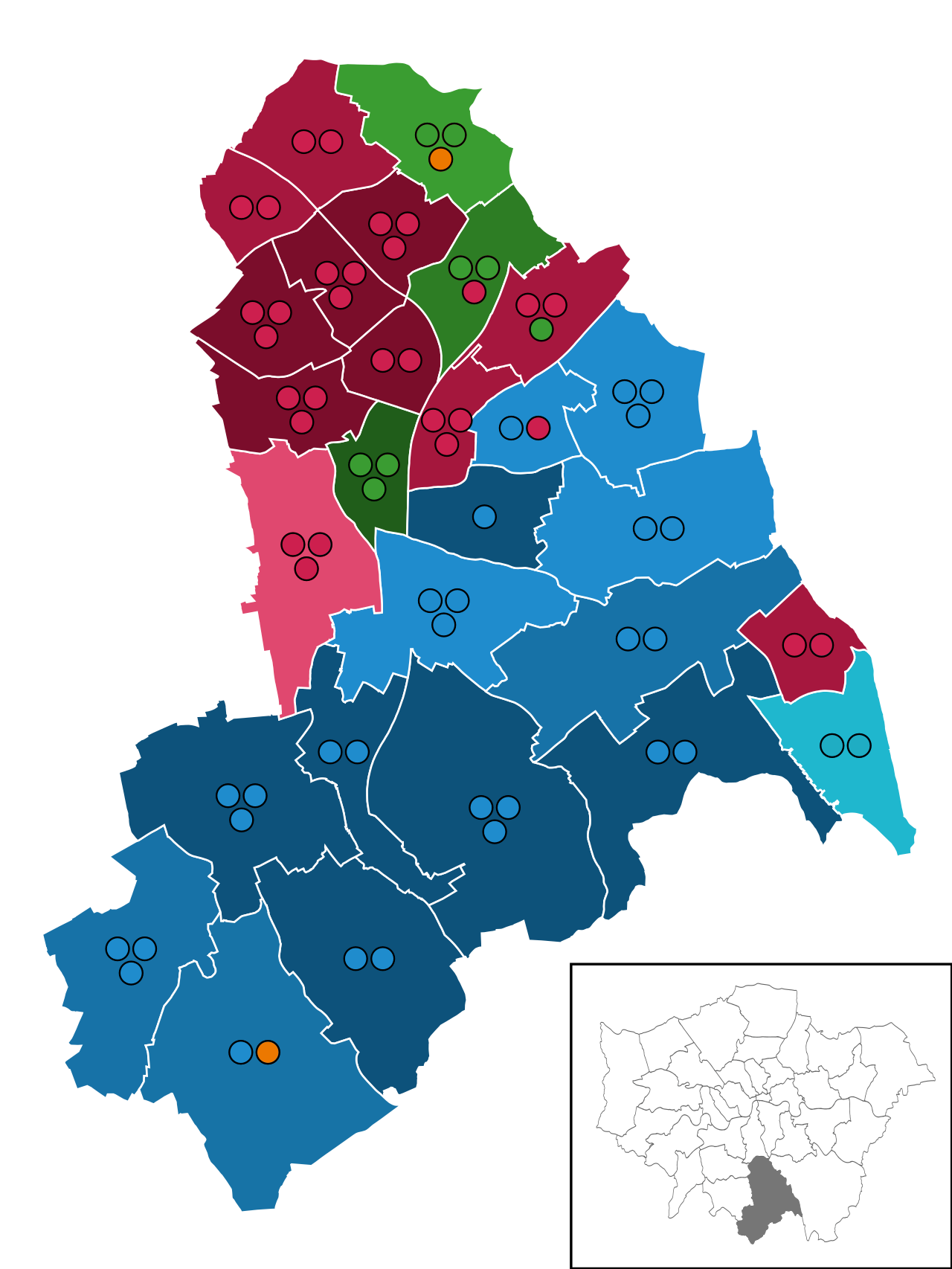
Croydon 2026 results map

Ealing 2026 results map

Enfield 2026 results map

Greenwich 2026 results map

Hackney 2026 results map

Hammersmith and Fulham 2026 results map

Haringey 2026 results map

Harrow 2026 results map

Havering 2026 results map

Hillingdon 2026 results map

Hounslow 2026 results map

Islington 2026 results map

Kensington and Chelsea 2026 results map

Kingston Upon Thames 2026 results map

Lambeth 2026 results map

Lewisham 2026 results map

Merton 2026 results map

Newham 2026 results map

Redbridge 2026 results map

Richmond upon Thames 2026 results map

Southwark 2026 results map

Sutton 2026 results map

Tower Hamlets 2026 results map

Waltham Forest 2026 results map

Wandsworth 2022 results map

Westminster 2026 results map
