= 2026 United Kingdom local elections =

- 7 May 2026

5,066 council seats in England; 136 unitary, metropolitan, county, district and London councils in England; 6 directly elected mayors in England; 2 council by-elections in Wales
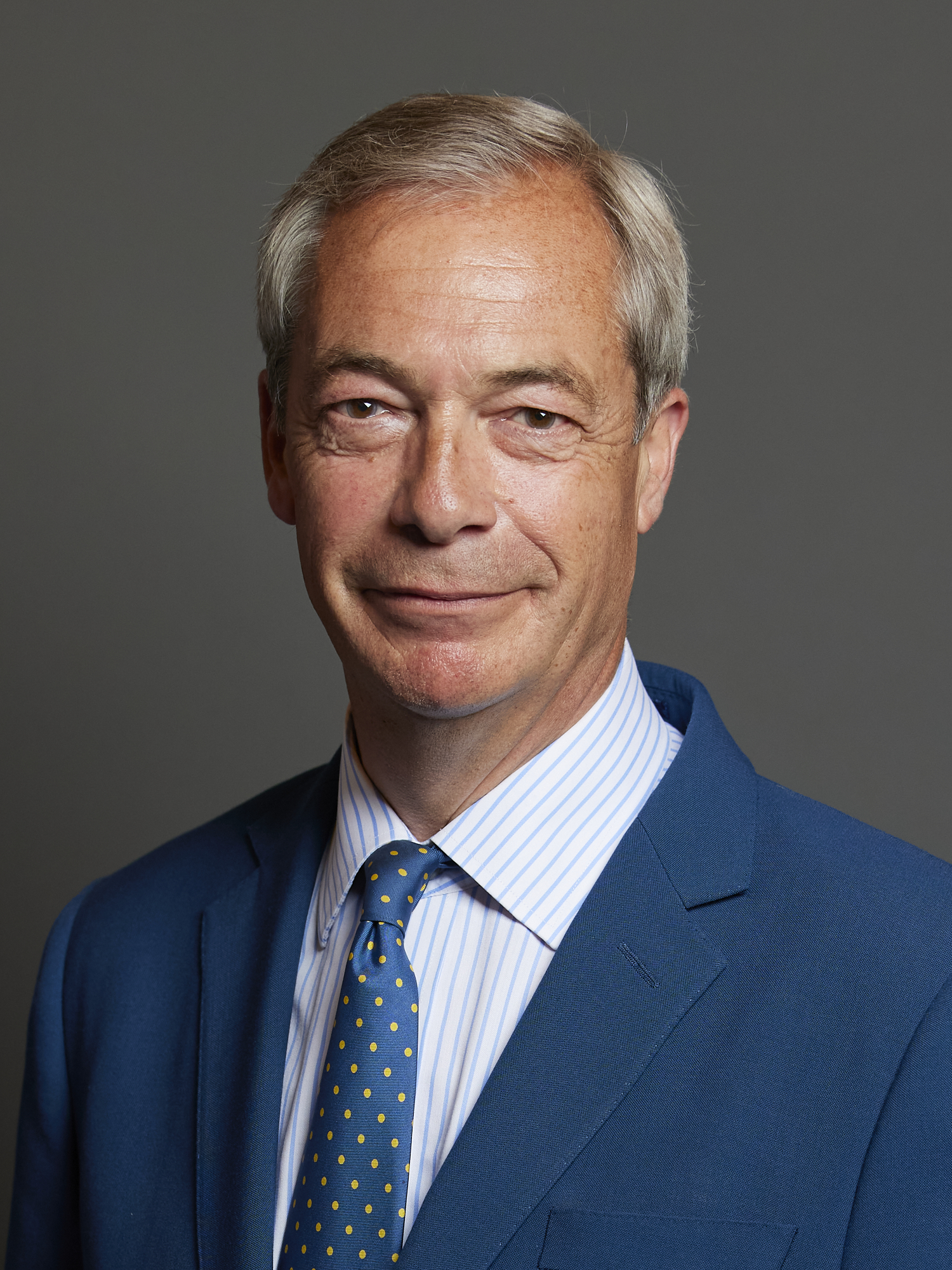

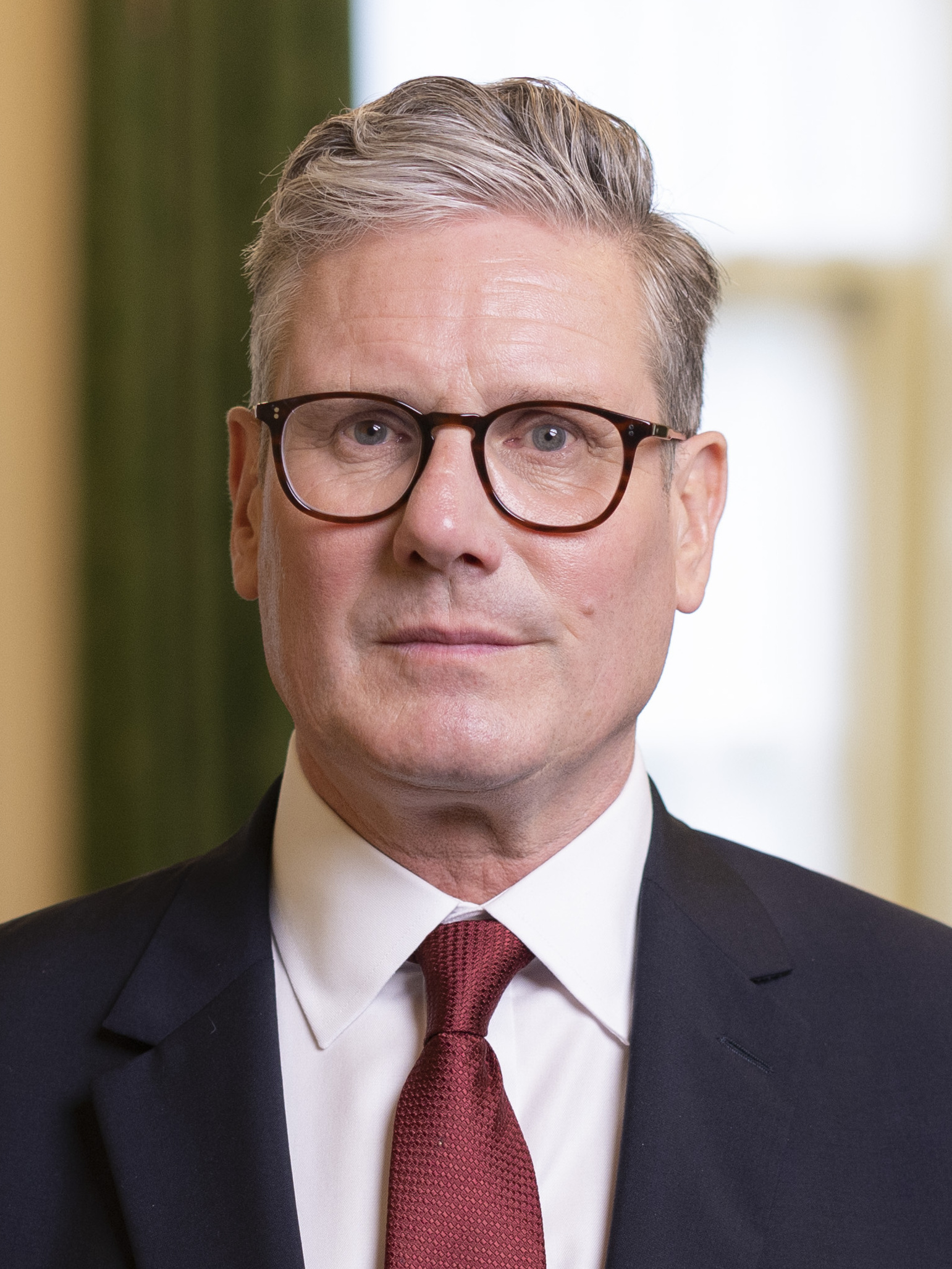

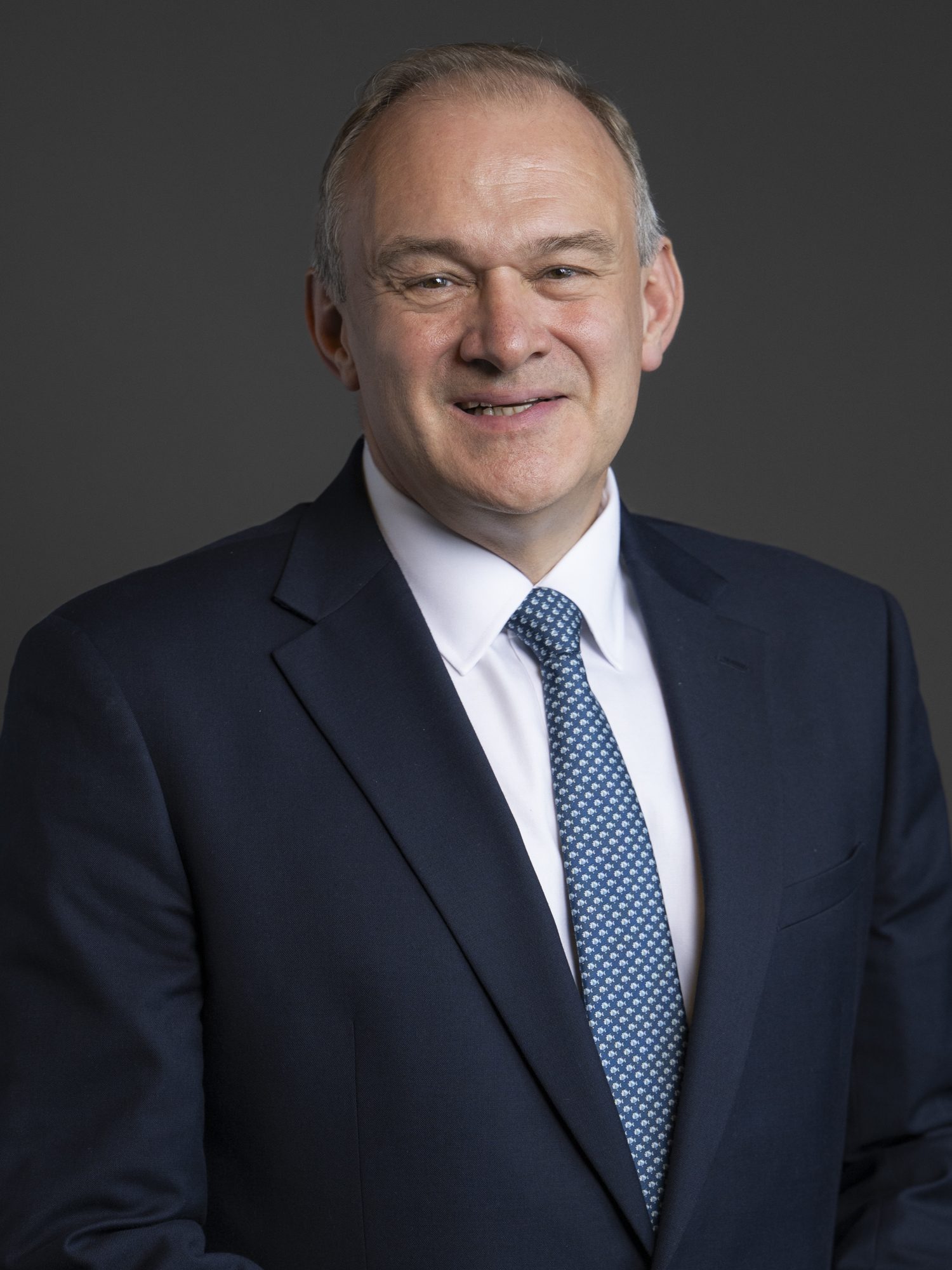

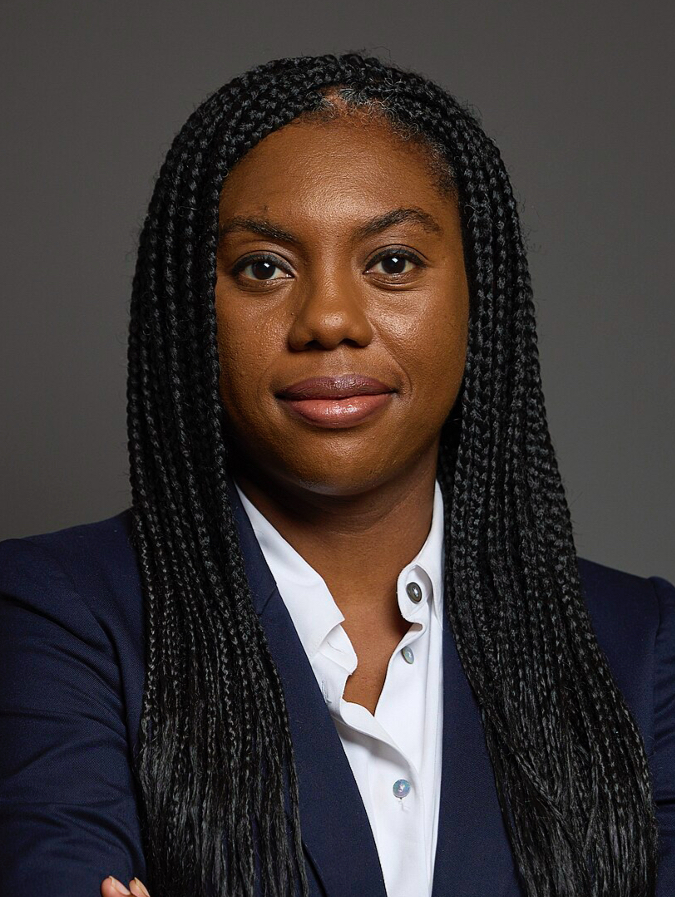

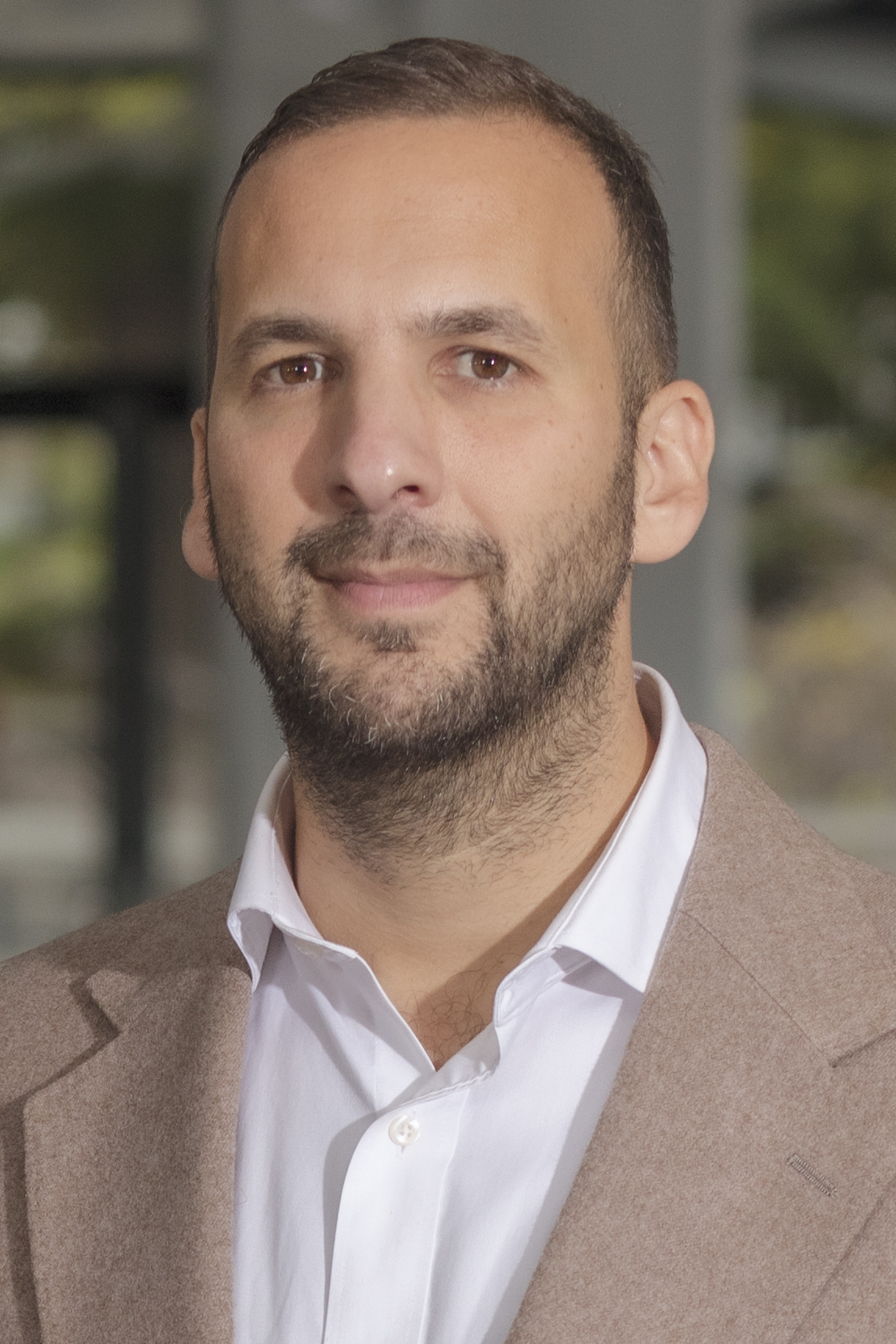
	First party	Second party	Third party
Leader	Nigel Farage	Keir Starmer	Ed Davey
Party	Reform	Labour	Liberal Democrats
Leader since	3 June 2024	4 April 2020	27 August 2020
Seats before	986 seats 78 up for election	5,830 seats 2,196 up for election	3,180 seats 663 up for election
Projected vote share (Note: All vote shares are projected national vote shares calculated by the BBC.)	26% ▼4 pp	17% ▼3 pp	16% ▼1 pp
Councillors	1,454	1,068	844
Councils	14	28	15
Councillors ±	▲1,452	▼1,498	▲155
Councils ±	▲14	▼38	▲1
	Fourth party	Fifth party
Leader	Kemi Badenoch	Zack Polanski
Party	Conservative	Green
Leader since	2 November 2024	2 September 2025
Seats before	4,180 seats 1,134 up for election	914 seats 170 up for election
Projected vote share	17% ▲2 pp	18% ▲7 pp
Councillors	801	587
Councils	9	5
Councillors ±	▼563	▲441
Councils ±	▼6	▲5

No overall control
Aspire	Labour	Conservative
Liberal Democrats	Reform UK	Green

Local elections in the United Kingdom were held on 7 May 2026 for 5,066 English councillors for 136 English local authorities (all 32 London borough councils, 32 metropolitan boroughs, 18 unitary authorities, 6 county councils, 48 district councils) and six directly elected mayors in England. Most of these seats in England were last up for election in 2022. Some of these elections were postponed from 2025.

No local elections were held in the rest of the United Kingdom, other than two by-elections in Wales. The 2026 Scottish Parliament election and 2026 Senedd election were held the same day. The results were a success for both Reform UK and the Green Party (which had the largest increase in vote share), although Reform's vote share dropped since the previous election and the Greens underperformed opinion polls while Labour overperformed prior seat projections, and the vote projections showed a slight recovery for the Conservative Party. The Labour Party continued their collapse in vote share, with little change for the Liberal Democrats. The elections resulted in Reform UK gaining 1,453 councillors, while the Green Party won 587 seats, its highest number of councillors at the time.

Polling expert John Curtice noted that these results further confirmed the fragmentation of the United Kingdom's politics, as none of the political parties had the significant backing of the public; according to Sky News and the BBC, Reform UK won 26% to 27% of the vote, while most of the other major parties hovered around 20% to 16% of the vote. Reform UK did well in areas with high Brexit support. Labour lost 1,498 councillors and lost control of 38 councils, triggering an internal leadership crisis that culminated in Keir Starmer announcing his resignation as Prime Minister.

== Background ==
Post-1998 ceremonial counties of England by year of restructuring: 2009; 2019–2023; Upcoming (2027–2028)

The English Devolution White Paper on 16 December 2024 set out the Labour government's plans for local government reorganisation, involving the remaining two-tier counties of England being abolished with elections to new unitary authorities. Some of the elections scheduled for May 2025 were delayed by a year to allow reorganisation to take place. At least 13 of the 21 county councils asked the government to delay their elections. On 5 February 2025, the government announced that elections to nine councils (seven county councils and two unitary authorities) would not take place in 2025 to allow restructuring to take place, with elections to reformed or newly created replacement authorities taking place in 2026.

By November 2025, it had been announced that Surrey County Council and the districts included in it would be replaced by new unitary authorities, but the government said that other initially-scheduled 2025 elections would take place in the existing local government structure unless there was "strong justification otherwise", with the process of creating new unitary authorities delayed. Four new combined authority mayoral elections — Greater Essex, Hampshire and the Solent, Norfolk and Suffolk, and Sussex and Brighton — were delayed to 2028, having been originally scheduled for 2026.

In December 2025, the Labour government invited 63 councils to raise capacity concerns with ongoing local government reorganisation and request a postponement of their 2026 local elections, after also postponing 6 combined authority mayoral elections that were scheduled to occur on the same day. This move prompted criticism from the Electoral Commission, which questioned the credibility of the reasoning given and said that it caused "unprecedented" uncertainty. The Commission stated that "There is a clear conflict of interest in asking existing Councils to decide how long it will be before they are answerable to voters". Opposition parties also criticised the decision, accusing Labour of denying people the right to vote. By February 2026, the government confirmed that 30 of the 63 council elections had been postponed. However, following a legal challenge by Reform UK, which had made major gains in the previous local elections, the government withdrew on 16 February 2026 its plans to delay elections, after receiving legal advice that the delay could be unlawful; all scheduled elections for 2026, along with the delayed elections from 2025, were now to take place.

This is the second set of local elections during the premiership of Prime Minister Keir Starmer, and it occurred during a time of Reform UK and the Greens rising sharply in opinion polls. It is the first set of local elections to take place after Zack Polanski became leader of the Green Party.

== Campaigns ==
Aggregate seats contested by party
Party	Seats
Labour	4,900 / 5,066 (97%)
Reform UK	4,821 / 5,066 (95%)
Conservative	4,770 / 5,066 (94%)
Green	4,505 / 5,066 (89%)
Liberal Democrats	3,949 / 5,066 (78%)
TUSC	286 / 5,066 (6%)
Workers	69 / 5,066 (1%)
SDP	48 / 5,066 (0.9%)
Your Party	20 / 5,066 (0.4%)
Advance UK	17 / 5,066 (0.3%)
Rejoin EU	15 / 5,066 (0.3%)
Restore Britain (Great Yarmouth First)	10 / 5,066 (0.2%)

In England, Labour were defending more than 2,500 seats, the Conservatives over 1,300 and the Liberal Democrats just under 700.

Over 25,000 candidates were nominated to stand in the elections. Reform UK, Labour, the Conservatives and the Green party all stood candidates in over 95% of wards, while the Liberal Democrats had candidates in 86%. The only other party with candidates in more than 2% of wards was the Trade Unionist and Socialist Coalition, with 9%.

=== Labour ===
On 20 March 2026,Sharon Graham (the General Secretary of Unite) said in a speech to refuse workers at a protest near a waste depot in Tyseley, Birmingham that Labour would be "decimated" in the upcoming local elections and should "hang their heads in shame" over its handling of the Birmingham bin strike.

On 30 March 2026, Keir Starmer launched Labour's local election campaign at City of Wolverhampton College, West Midlands. According to ITV, Wolverhampton was at the time one of Labour's safest councils in the region and Keir Starmer denied Birmingham was a "lost cause". The BBC said Labour was going into the elections with consistently low poll ratings.

=== Conservatives ===
On 19 March 2026, Kemi Badenoch launched the Conservative campaign for the local elections at an event at Sinfonia Smith Square in Westminster, London.

On 6 May 2026, Kemi Badenoch declined to rule out local pacts with Reform in an interview with Sky News, suggesting she would be "happy" to see Conservative and Reform councillors collaborating to deliver right wing policies at a local level. On 7 May 2026, she rowed back on this in an interview with the The Sun, saying "We're not doing deals with Reform. I don't want to see us helping Reform... they're not serious."

=== Liberal Democrats ===
On 24 March 2026, Ed Davey launched the Liberal Democrat campaign for the local elections at an event in Lovelace Lodge, in East Horsley, Surrey.

=== Reform UK ===
On 1 January 2026, Nigel Farage announced he wanted to go "double or quits" by planning to spend more than £5 million over the following four months in the run-up to the local elections, saying he wanted to spend "every single penny in the bank account" on a mass direct mail and social media campaign. He called the year's set of local elections the "single most important event" before the next general election. In August 2025, Reform UK received a £9 million donation from Christopher Harborne, a British–Thai billionaire businessman.

On 10 March 2026, Farage launched Reform's local election campaign at a live-streamed event with 1,500 supporters at GG's restaurant, in Newport, Isle of Wight. This was the first in a planned nationwide series of rallies.

=== Green Party ===
Following the election of Zack Polanski as Green Party leader, the party rose sharply in popularity polls.

The Green Party launched its local elections campaign on 9 April 2026. The party stated its desire to build and maintain council housing and social homes, pointing to Green-led councils in Lewes and Mid Suffolk, which built hundreds of new council homes in previous years. It also vowed to put pressure on the Labour Party to introduce rent controls and abolish the leasehold system, "freeing five million people from the financial burden of service charges".

=== Restore Britain ===
On 1 April 2026, Rupert Lowe announced Restore Britain would not stand candidates for the local elections except in the Great Yarmouth area of the 2026 Norfolk County Council election through Great Yarmouth First, its local affiliate party, stating the election would serve as a testing ground for future Restore Britain candidacies.

=== Independents ===
Dissatisfied over the Labour government's position on the Gaza war, a large number of Muslim candidates stood as independents, campaigning exclusively on pro-Gaza sentiments. Many among them were endorsed by the Your Party and The Muslim Vote. In Birmingham, significant controversy erupted over the candidature of Shahid Butt, a British Pakistani who had been convicted in a plot of bombing the British consulate, an Anglican Church and a Swiss-owned hotel in Yemen in 1999, who campaigned on an explicitly new antisemitic platform.

== Results ==
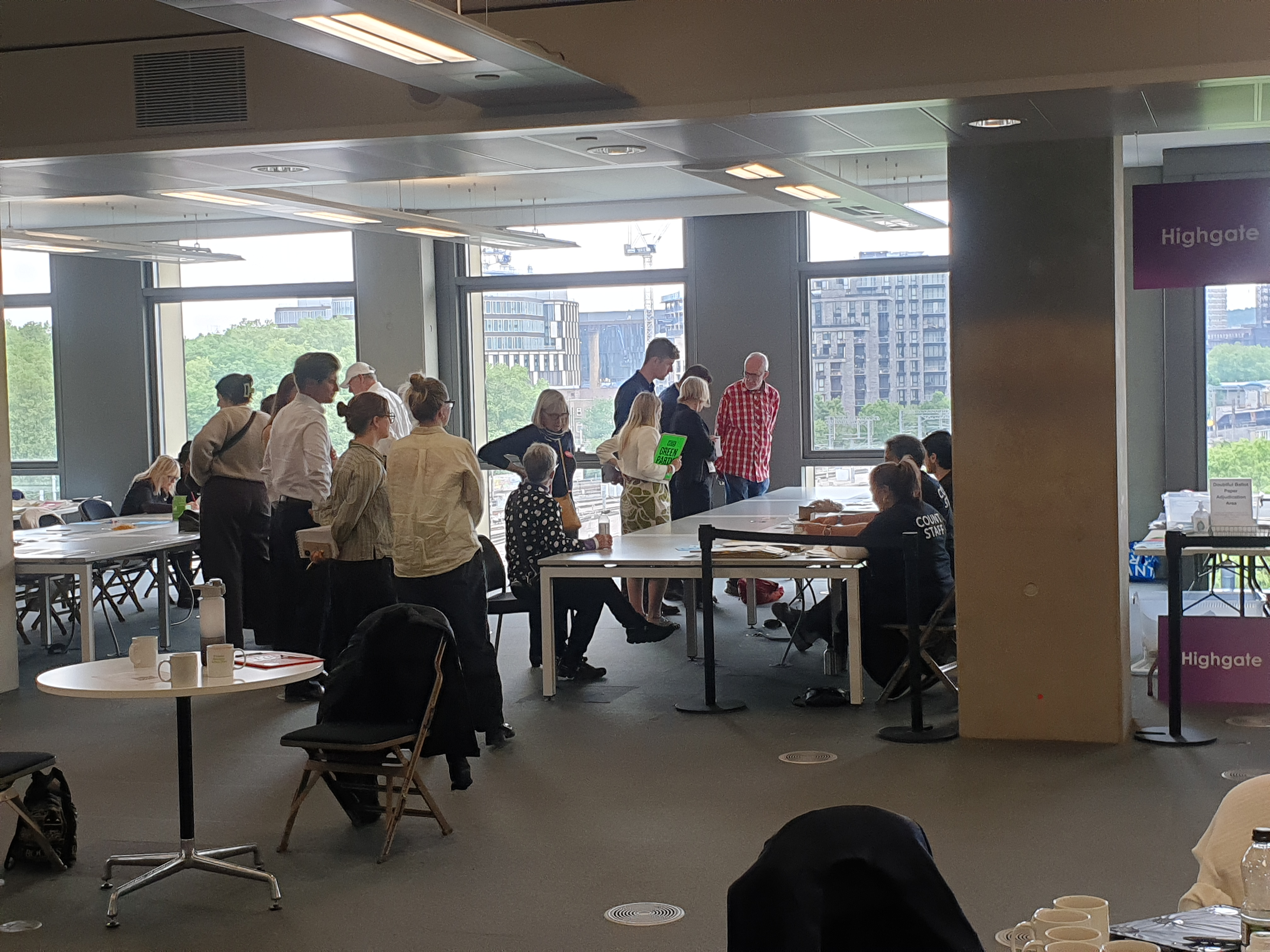
Candidates and party agents watching the count for the 7 May 2026 Camden Council elections in Highgate ward

=== Overview ===
With all 136 councils being declared, Reform UK took 1,453 councillor positions, an increase of 1,451 seats. Labour took 1,068 seats, a decrease of 1,496 seats. The Tories took 801 seats, a decrease of 563 seats. The Liberal Democrats took 844 seats, an increase of 155. The Green Party took 587 seats, an increase of 411. Independent-orientated candidates won 212 seats, up 34 seats. The Residents' Association won 36 seats, a decrease of 31.

Labour lost control of 38 councils, Reform UK gained 14 councils, Conservatives lost 6 councils, the Liberal Democrats gained 1 council, Green gained 5 councils, and 23 councils switched to being in a state of no overall control by a political party.

=== London boroughs ===
Elections for all councillors in all thirty-two London boroughs have been held in 2026 in line with their normal election schedule. The previous elections to London borough councils were held in 2022, which saw Labour win its second-best result in any London election and the Conservatives return their lowest-ever number of councillors in the capital.

Council	Seats	Council control before election							Seats	Council control after election							
Council	Seats	Lab	Con	LD	Grn	Ref	Other	Administration	Seats	Lab	Con	LD	Grn	Ref	Other	Administration	Election Details
Barking and Dagenham	51	47	1	0	3	0	0	Labour	51	38 ▼9	0 ▼1	0	4 ▲1	9 ▲9	0	Labour	Details
Barnet	63	40	19	0	1	1	2	Labour	63	31 ▼9	31 ▲12	0	1	0 ▼1	0 ▼2	No overall control (Labour minority)	Details
Bexley	45	12	30	0	0	0	3	Conservative	45	9 ▼3	29 ▼1	0	0	7 ▲7	0 ▼3	Conservative	Details
Brent	57	42	6	3	5	0	1	Labour	57	26 ▼16	11 ▲5	11 ▲8	9 ▲4	0	0 ▼1	No overall control (Labour minority)	Details
Bromley	58	11	33	5	0	3	6	Conservative	58	8 ▼3	35 ▲2	6 ▲1	0	6 ▲3	3 ▼3 Chislehurst Matters:3	Conservative	Details
Camden	55	45	3	6	1	0	0	Labour	55	30 ▼15	3	10 ▲4	11 ▲10	0	1 ▲1 Camden People's Alliance:1	Labour	Details
Croydon	70	34	33 (Note: Led by a Conservative Mayor)	1	2	0	0	No overall control (Conservative minority)	70	30 ▼4	28 ▼5	2 ▲1	8 ▲6	2 ▲2	0	No overall control	Details
Ealing	70	59	4	7	0	0	1	Labour	70	46 ▼13	5 ▲1	13 ▲6	5 ▲5	0	1 ▲1 Independent:1	Labour	Details
Enfield	63	35	25	0	0	0	3	Labour	63	27 ▼8	31 ▲6	0	5 ▲5	0	0 ▼3	No overall control	Details
Greenwich	55	47	4	0	2	0	2	Labour	55	35 ▼12	6 ▲2	0	13 ▲11	1 ▲1	0 ▼2	Labour	Details
Hackney	57	44	6	0	4	0	3	Labour	57	9 ▼35	6	0	42 ▲38	0	0 ▼3	Green	Details
Hammersmith and Fulham	50	36	10	0	2	0	1	Labour	50	38 ▲2	12 ▲2	0	0 ▼2	0	0 ▼1	Labour	Details
Haringey	57	43	0	7	2	0	5	Labour	57	21 ▼22	0	8 ▲1	28 ▲26	0	0 ▼5	No overall control (Green minority)	Details
Harrow	55	23	31	0	0	0	1	Conservative	55	12 ▼11	42 ▲11	0	0	0	1 1 Arise:1	Conservative	Details
Havering	55	8	16	0	0	1	30	No overall control (HRA minority)	55	2 ▼6	0 ▼16	0	0	39 ▲38	14 ▼16 Havering Residents Association:11 Harold Wood Hill Park Residents Association:3	Reform	Details
Hillingdon	53	16	30	0	1	0	5	Conservative	53	16	30	0	1	4 ▲4	0 ▼5	Conservative	Details
Hounslow	62	45	10	0	1	0	6	Labour	62	32 ▼13	17 ▲7	1 ▲1	3 ▲2	8 ▲8	1 ▼5 Independent:1	Labour	Details
Islington	51	44	0	0	3	0	4	Labour	51	32 ▼12	0	0	19 ▲16	0	0 ▼4	Labour	Details
Kensington and Chelsea	50	7	36	2	1	0	4	Conservative	50	13 ▲6	34 ▼2	3 ▲1	0 ▼1	0	0 ▼4	Conservative	Details
Kingston upon Thames	48	0	2	42	0	0	4	Liberal Democrats	48	0	2	44 ▲2	0	0	2 ▼2 Kingston Independent Residents Group:2	Liberal Democrats	Details
Lambeth	63	55	0	4	4	0	1	Labour	63	26 ▼32	0	8 ▲5	29 ▲27	0	0	No overall control	Details
Lewisham	54	50	0	0	4	0	0	Labour	54	14 ▼36	0	0	40 ▲36	0	0	Green	Details
Merton	57	30	7	16	0	0	3	Labour	57	32 ▲2	4 ▼3	19 ▲3	0	0	2 ▼1 Merton Park Ward Independent Residents:1	Labour	Details
Newham	66	56	0	0	3	0	7	Labour	66	26 ▼30	0	0	16 ▲13	0	24 ▲17 Newham Independents:24	No overall control	Details
Redbridge	63	54	5	0	0	0	4	Labour	63	43 ▼11	5	0	5 ▲5	1 ▲1	9 ▲5 Redbridge Independents:9	Labour	Details
Richmond upon Thames	54	0	0	49	5	0	0	Liberal Democrats	54	0	0	54 ▲5	0 ▼5	0	0	Liberal Democrats	Details
Southwark	63	45	0	11	4	0	3	Labour	63	29 ▼16	0	12 ▲1	22 ▲18	0	0 ▼3	No overall control	Details
Sutton	55	2	21	29	0	0	3	Liberal Democrats	55	1 ▼1	0 ▼21	51 ▲22	0	2 ▲2	1 ▼2 Independent:9	Liberal Democrats	Details
Tower Hamlets	45	16	1	0	1	0	27	Aspire	45	5 ▼7	1	1 ▲1	5 ▲4	0	33 ▲6 Aspire:33	Aspire	Details
Waltham Forest	60	45	12	0	0	1	2	Labour	60	15 ▼30	14 ▲2	0	31 ▲31	0 ▼1	0 ▼2	Green	Details
Wandsworth	58	34	21	0	0	1	2	Labour	58	28 ▼6	29 ▲8	0	0	0 ▼1	1 ▼1 Independent:1	No overall control	Details
Westminster	54	28	24	0	0	2	0	Labour	54	22 ▼6	32 ▲8	0	0	0 ▼2	0	Conservative	Details
All 32 councils	1,817	1,046	386	181	47	13	136	All 32 councils	1,817	696	407	243	297	79	93		

=== Metropolitan boroughs ===
There are thirty-six metropolitan boroughs, which are single-tier local authorities. Thirty-two of them had an election in 2026 (Doncaster, Liverpool, Wirral and Rotherham do not). Of these, Birmingham City Council and St Helens Council hold their elections on a four-year cycle from 2022, so were due to hold an election in 2026. In 2025 Barnsley Council held a public consultation regarding the permanent adoption of the whole council election cycle, with the result that Barnsley will hold its elections on a four-year cycle starting from 2026.

The remaining twenty-nine councils generally elect a third of their councillors every year for three years with no election in each fourth year, on the same timetable which included elections in 2026. Thirteen of these metropolitan borough councils had all of their councillors up for election in 2026 rather than the usual one-third, following ward boundary changes from their LGBCE electoral review. All thirteen will likely be reverting to thirds in 2027, 2028 and 2030.

==== Elections for all councillors ====
Council	Seats	Council control before election							Election details	Council control after election						
Council	Seats	Lab	Con	LD	Grn	Ref	Other	Administration	Election details	Lab	Con	LD	Grn	Ref	Other	Administration
Barnsley	63	46	1	12	0	0	3	Labour	Details	11 ▼35	0 ▼1	8 ▼4	0	42 ▲42	2 ▼1	Reform
Birmingham	101	51	21	13	2	0	12	Labour	Details	17 ▼34	16 ▼5	12 ▼1	19 ▲17	23 ▲23	14	No overall control (Lib Dem/Green/Better Birmingham Ind. minority)
Bradford	90	47	13	5	10	0	15	Labour	Details	17 ▼30	18 ▲5	1 ▼4	9 ▼1	29 ▲29	13 ▼2	No overall control (Reform minority)
Calderdale	54	26	8	6	3	3	3	Labour	Details	8 ▼18	0 ▼8	2 ▼4	7 ▲4	34 ▲31	3	Reform
Coventry	54	39	10	0	2	2	1	Labour	Details	24 ▼15	6 ▼4	0	4 ▲2	20 ▲18	0 ▼1	No overall control (Labour minority)
Gateshead	66	46	0	18	0	0	2	Labour	Details	12 ▼34	0	13 ▼5	3 ▲3	38 ▲38	0 ▼2	Reform
Kirklees	69	23	16	9	4	0	16	No overall control (Labour minority)	Details	0 ▼23	9 ▼7	5 ▼4	12 ▲8	29 ▲29	14 ▼2	No overall control
Newcastle upon Tyne	78	34	1	22	4	0	15	No overall control (Labour minority)	Details	2 ▼32	0 ▼1	25 ▲3	24 ▲20	24 ▲24	3 ▼12	No overall control (Lib Dem minority)
Sandwell	72	60	4	0	2	0	5	Labour	Details	28 ▼32	0 ▼4	0	2	41 ▲41	1 ▼4	Reform
Sefton	66	51	3	9	1	1	1	Labour	Details	36 ▼15	0 ▼3	17 ▲8	3 ▲2	5 ▲4	5 ▲4	Labour
Solihull	51	1	28	8	8	3	3	Conservative	Details	0 ▼1	24 ▼4	6 ▼2	4 ▼4	17 ▲14	0 ▼3	No overall control
South Tyneside	54	27	0	0	9	0	18	Labour	Details	1 ▼26	0	0	10 ▲1	41 ▲41	2 ▼16	Reform
St Helens	48	28	2	3	4	3	6	Labour	Details	2 ▼26	1 ▼1	3	0 ▼4	34 ▲31	6	Reform
Sunderland	75	48	9	12	1	0	4	Labour	Details	5 ▼43	0 ▼9	12	0 ▼1	58 ▲58	0 ▼4	Reform
Wakefield	63	48	1	2	1	2	9	Labour	Details	1 ▼47	1	2	1	58 ▲56	0 ▼9	Reform
Walsall	60	11	29	0	0	0	20	Conservative	Details	1 ▼11	10 ▼19	0	0	40 ▲40	9 ▼11	Reform
16 councils	1,064															

==== Elections for one third of councillors ====
Council	Seats		Council control before election							Election details	Council control after election						
Council	up	of	Lab	Con	LD	Grn	Ref	Other	Administration	Election details	Lab	Con	LD	Grn	Ref	Other	Administration
Bolton	20	60	25	15	6	0	1	13	No overall control (Labour minority)	Details	20 ▼5	11 ▼4	5 ▼1	3 ▲3	10 ▲9	11 ▼2	No overall control (Labour minority)
Bury	17	51	32	5	0	0	3	11	Labour	Details	30 ▼2	3 ▼2	0	0	6 ▲3	12 ▲1	Labour
Dudley	24+1	72	23	33	5	0	3	7	No overall control (Conservative minority)	Details	15 ▼8	27 ▼6	4 ▼1	0	23 ▲20	3 ▼4	No overall control
Knowsley	15+1	45	30	0	3	7	0	4	Labour	Details	24 ▼6	0	3	8	4 ▲4	6 ▲2	Labour
Leeds	33+3	99	56	13	6	6	2	12	Labour	Details	48 ▼8	14 ▲1	6	11 ▲5	10 ▲8	10 ▼2	No overall control (Labour minority)
Manchester	32	96	87	0	4	4	0	1	Labour	Details	63 ▼24	0	4	21 ▲17	7 ▲7	1	Labour
North Tyneside	20	60	50	8	0	0	1	1	Labour	Details	38 ▼12	8	0	2 ▲2	11 ▲10	1	Labour
Oldham	20	60	26	6	9	0	3	16	No overall control (Labour minority)	Details	18 ▼8	4 ▼2	6 ▼3	0	16 ▲13	16	No overall control
Rochdale	20	60	43	8	3	0	2	4	Labour	Details	31 ▼12	7 ▼1	3	0	15 ▲13	4	Labour
Salford	20+1	60	45	7	2	0	1	3	Labour	Details	34 ▼13	6 ▼1	1 ▼1	3 ▲3	14 ▲13	2 ▼1	Labour
Sheffield	28+2	84	34	0	27	14	1	6	No overall control (Labour minority)	Details	25 ▼10	0	22 ▼6	20 ▲6	13 ▲12	4 ▼2	No overall control
Stockport	21	63	19	1	30	3	0	10	No overall control (Lib Dem minority)	Details	14 ▼5	1	33 ▲3	4 ▲1	2 ▲2	9 ▼1	Liberal Democrats
Tameside	19	57	38	7	0	0	1	10	Labour	Details	25 ▼14	5 ▼2	0	0	19 ▲18	8 ▼2	No overall control
Trafford	21	63	41	10	7	5	0	0	Labour	Details	35 ▼6	12 ▲2	7	7 ▲2	2 ▲2	0	Labour
Wigan	25	75	62	1	0	0	2	10	Labour	Details	42 ▼20	0 ▼1	0	0	26 ▲24	9 ▼1	Labour
Wolverhampton	20+1	60	44	11	0	0	2	2	Labour	Details	35 ▼9	10 ▼1	0	0	13 ▲11	2 ▼1	Labour
16 councils	355+9	1,065															

=== Other unitary authorities ===
Most of these unitary authorities elect councillors in thirds, with councillors elected in 2022 up for reelection in 2026. Swindon and Milton Keynes elect councillors by thirds, but had all seats up in 2026 due to new ward boundaries. Thurrock and Isle of Wight both had all-up elections delayed from 2025. East Surrey and West Surrey are both newly-created councils with all councillors to be elected.

==== Elections for all councillors ====
Council	Seats	Council control before election							Election details	Council control after election						
Council	Seats	Lab	Con	LD	Grn	Ref	Other	Administration	Election details	Lab	Con	LD	Grn	Ref	Other	Administration
East Surrey	72	New council, formerly 5 districts of Surrey Details: District / Administration; Elmbridge / No overall control; Epsom and Ewell / Residents Association; Mole Valley / Liberal Democrats; Reigate and Banstead / No overall control; Tandridge / No overall control							Details	0	10	40	8	5	9	Liberal Democrats
Isle of Wight	39	1	13	4	2	2	17	No overall control (Note: no overall control (Alliance Group (independents + Green + Our Island) minority coalition))	Details	1	2 ▼11	4	2	19 ▲17	11 ▼6	No overall control
Milton Keynes	60	30	9	18	0	0	0	Labour	Details	19 ▼11	12 ▲3	20 ▲2	0	9 ▲9	0	No overall control (Lab/Lib Dem coalition)
Swindon	57	34	16	1	4	0	2	Labour	Details	19 ▼15	23 ▲7	1	0 ▼4	14 ▲14	0 ▼2	No overall control
Thurrock	49	26	11	0	0	4	8	Labour	Details	2 ▼24	2 ▼9	0	0	45 ▲41	0 ▼8	Reform
West Surrey	90	New council, formerly 6 districts of Surrey Details: District / Administration; Guildford / Liberal Democrats; Runnymede / No overall control; Spelthorne / No overall control; Surrey Heath / Liberal Democrats; Waverley / No overall control; Woking / Liberal Democrats							Details	0	20	56	0	9	5	Liberal Democrats
6 councils	367															

==== Elections for one third of councillors ====
Council	Seats		Council control before election							Election details	Council control after election						
Council	up	of	Lab	Con	LD	Grn	Ref	Other	Administration	Election details	Lab	Con	LD	Grn	Ref	Other	Administration
Blackburn with Darwen	17	51	27	9	0	0	0	15	Labour	Details	20 ▼7	5 ▼4	0	0	9 ▲9	17 ▲2	No overall control
Halton	18+1	54	44	0	3	0	1	4	Labour	Details	29 ▼15	0	3	0	16 ▲15	4	Labour
Hartlepool	12	36	22	5	0	0	3	6	Labour	Details	15 ▼7	1 ▼4	0	0	15 ▲12	5 ▼1	No overall control
Hull	19	57	23	0	29	0	0	5	Liberal Democrats	Details	16 ▼7	0	26 ▼3	0	10 ▲10	5	No overall control
North East Lincolnshire	15	42	15	18	3	0	1	5	No overall control (Conservative minority)	Details	11 ▼4	10 ▼8	3	0	14 ▲13	4 ▼1	No overall control
Peterborough	18	60	13	10	8	5	1	22	No overall control (Labour/Peterborough First/Lib Dem coalition)	Details	11 ▼2	13 ▲3	8	6 ▲1	5 ▲4	17 ▼5	No overall control (Labour/Peterborough First/Lib Dem coalition)
Plymouth	19	57	39	7	1	2	2	6	Labour	Details	31 ▼8	3 ▼4	0 ▼1	3 ▲1	16 ▲14	4 ▼2	Labour
Portsmouth	14	42	9	4	18	0	10	1	No overall control (Lib Dem minority)	Details	5 ▼4	3 ▼1	22 ▲4	0	12 ▲2	1	Liberal Democrats
Reading	16+1	48	31	3	3	8	1	1	Labour	Details	29 ▼2	5 ▲2	3	11 ▲3	0 ▼1	0 ▼1	Labour
Southampton	17	51	31	9	7	2	1	1	Labour	Details	24 ▼7	6 ▼3	7	6 ▲4	8 ▲7	0 ▼1	No overall control (Labour minority)
Southend-on-Sea	17	51	19	14	4	2	4	8	No overall control (Lab/ind./Lib Dem coalition)	Details	17 ▼2	11 ▼3	3 ▼1	4 ▲2	11 ▲7	5 ▼3	No overall control
Wokingham	18+1	54	5	19	28	1	0	1	Liberal Democrats	Details	5	19	29 ▲1	1	0	0 ▼1	Liberal Democrats
12 councils	200+3	603															

=== Mayors ===
==== Local authorities ====
Council	Mayor before	Elected mayor	Details
Croydon	Jason Perry (Con)	Jason Perry (Con)	Details
Hackney	Caroline Woodley (Labour Co-op)	Zoë Garbett (Grn)	Details
Lewisham	Brenda Dacres (Labour Co-op)	Liam Shrivastava (Grn)	Details
Newham	Rokhsana Fiaz (Labour Co-op)	Forhad Hussain (Lab)	Details
Tower Hamlets	Lutfur Rahman (Aspire)	Lutfur Rahman (Aspire)	Details
Watford	Peter Taylor (Lib Dem)	Peter Taylor (Lib Dem)	Details

=== County councils ===
All of these elections were delayed from 2025.

Council	Seats	Election details	Council control before election							Council control after election						
Council	Seats	Election details	Lab	Con	LD	Grn	Ref	Other	Administration	Lab	Con	LD	Grn	Ref	Other	Administration
East Sussex	50	Details	5	22	11	6	2	4	No overall control	0 ▼5	3 ▼19	13 ▲2	11 ▲5	22 ▲20	1 ▼3	No overall control
Essex (Note: New electoral boundaries)	78	Details	6	49	6	1	1	10	Conservative	1 ▼5	13 ▼36	5 ▼1	1	53 ▲52	5 ▼5	Reform
Hampshire	78	Details	3	50	19	1	1	4	Conservative	1 ▼2	27 ▼23	26 ▲7	1	20 ▲19	3 ▼1	No overall control
Norfolk	84	Details	9	50	9	4	2	8	Conservative	1 ▼8	7 ▼43	13 ▲4	12 ▲8	39 ▲37	10 ▲2	No overall control
Suffolk	70	Details	6	44	5	9	6	5	Conservative	3 ▼3	9 ▼35	2 ▼3	13 ▲4	41 ▲35	2 ▼3	Reform
West Sussex	70	Details	8	38	10	2	4	7	Conservative	5 ▼3	11 ▼27	23 ▲13	7 ▲5	23 ▲19	1 ▼6	No overall control
6 councils	430															

=== District councils ===
==== Elections for all councillors ====
Council	Seats	Election details	Council control before election							Council control after election						
Council	Seats	Election details	Lab	Con	LD	Grn	Ref	Other	Administration	Lab	Con	LD	Grn	Ref	Other	Administration
Huntingdonshire	52	Details	3	18	16	2	0	13	No overall control (Lib Dem/Lab/Grn/ind. coalition)	1 ▼2	15 ▼3	20 ▲4	2	10 ▲10	4 ▼9	No overall control
Newcastle-under-Lyme	44	Details	17	26	0	0	0	0	Conservative	2 ▼15	15 ▼11	0	0	27 ▲27	0	Reform
South Cambridgeshire	45	Details	0	9	34	0	0	1	Liberal Democrats	0	2 ▼7	43 ▲11	0	0	0 ▼1	Liberal Democrats
3 councils	141															

==== Elections for half of councillors ====
Council	Seats		Election details	Council control before election							Council control after election						
Council	up	of	Election details	Lab	Con	LD	Grn	Ref	Other	Administration	Lab	Con	LD	Grn	Ref	Other	Administration
Adur	14	29	Details	17	2	0	2	0	8	Labour	17	0 ▼2	0	2	6 ▲6	4 ▼4	Labour
Cheltenham	20	40	Details	0	0	36	3	0	1	Liberal Democrats	0	0	35 ▼1	3	1 ▲1	1	Liberal Democrats
Fareham	16	32	Details	1	24	6	0	0	1	Conservative	1	22 ▼1	7	0	1 ▲1	1	Conservative
Gosport	14	28	Details	2	11	13	0	1	1	No overall control (Lib Dem minority)	0 ▼1	11 ▼1	6 ▼7	0	10 ▲9	1	No overall control
Hastings	16+1	32	Details	8	5	0	12	0	6	No overall control (Green minority)	4 ▼5	2 ▼3	0	19 ▲7	6 ▲6	1 ▼5	Green
Nuneaton and Bedworth	19	38	Details	18	17	1	2	0	0	No overall control (Labour minority)	11 ▼7	9 ▼8	0 ▼1	3 ▲1	15 ▲15	0	No overall control (Reform minority)
Oxford	24	48	Details	21	0	9	9	0	9	No overall control (Labour minority)	20 ▼1	0	9	13 ▲4	0	6 ▼3	No overall control (Labour minority)
7 councils	123+1	247															

==== Elections for one third of councillors ====
Council	Seats		Election details	Council control before election							Council control after election						
Council	up	of	Election details	Lab	Con	LD	Grn	Ref	Other	Administration	Lab	Con	LD	Grn	Ref	Other	Administration
Basildon	14	42	Details	16	13	0	0	1	12	No overall control (Lab/ind. coalition)	12 ▼6	12 ▼1	0	0	11 ▲11	7 ▼4	No overall control
Basingstoke and Deane	18+1	54	Details	10	12	11	2	1	16	No overall control (Lib Dem/ind. coalition)	10	11 ▼1	10 ▼1	2	3 ▲2	18 ▲2	No overall control
Brentwood	13+1	39	Details	3	16	16	0	1	2	No overall control (Lib Dem/Lab coalition)	2 ▼1	12 ▼5	16 ▼1	0	8 ▲7	1	No overall control
Broxbourne	10	30	Details	3	25	0	0	2	0	Conservative	3	24 ▼2	0	0	3 ▲2	0	Conservative
Burnley	15	45	Details	13	7	7	5	2	11	No overall control (Burnley Ind./Lib Dem/Grn coalition)	10 ▼3	4 ▼3	6 ▼1	3 ▼2	12 ▲10	10 ▼1	No overall control (Burnley Ind./Lib Dem/Grn coalition)
Cambridge	14+1	42	Details	23	1	10	6	0	1	Labour	17 ▼6	1	11 ▲1	12 ▲6	0	1	No overall control
Cannock Chase	12+1	36	Details	18	11	0	5	1	1	Labour	10 ▼8	8 ▼3	0	3 ▼2	14 ▲13	1	No overall control
Cherwell	16+2	48	Details	10	12	17	4	0	3	No overall control (Lib Dem/Grn/ind. minority coalition)	8 ▼2	8 ▼4	21 ▲4	4	6 ▲6	1 ▼2	No overall control (Lib Dem/Grn/ind.coalition)
Chorley	14	42	Details	36	4	0	0	1	1	Labour	29 ▼8	4	0	1 ▲1	7 ▲7	1	Labour
Colchester	17	51	Details	14	19	14	3	0	1	No overall control (Lib Dem/Lab coalition)	12 ▼2	18 ▼1	12 ▼2	3	5 ▲5	1	No overall control
Crawley	12+1	36	Details	25	9	0	0	1	0	Labour	21 ▼4	4 ▼6	0	0	10 ▲10	0	Labour
Eastleigh	14+1	39	Details	0	1	34	0	0	3	Liberal Democrats	0	1	34	0	0	3	Liberal Democrats
Epping Forest	18	54	Details	1	26	7	1	1	18	No overall control (Con minority)	1	19 ▼7	6 ▼1	0 ▼1	12 ▲11	16 ▼2	No overall control
Exeter	13+1	39	Details	22	2	4	6	2	2	Labour	17 ▼5	1 ▼1	5 ▲1	9 ▲3	4 ▲2	0	No overall control (Labour minority)
Harlow	11	33	Details	15	17	0	0	1	0	Conservative	10 ▼5	22 ▲5	0	0	1	0	Conservative
Hart	11	33	Details	0	9	12	0	0	12	No overall control (CCH/Lib Dem coalition)	0	8 ▼1	13 ▲1	0	0	12	No overall control
Havant	12	36	Details	9	8	5	6	5	3	No overall control (Lab/Lib Dem/Grn coalition)	7 ▼2	5 ▼3	5	6	10 ▲5	3	No overall control (Lab/Lib Dem/Grn minority coalition)
Hyndburn	11	35	Details	22	12	0	1	0	0	Labour	17 ▼5	8 ▼4	0	1	8 ▲8	1 ▲1	No overall control
Ipswich	16	48	Details	38	7	3	0	0	0	Labour	29 ▼9	5 ▼2	3	1 ▲1	10 ▲10	0	Labour
Lincoln	11	33	Details	20	5	6	0	0	2	Labour	17 ▼3	2 ▼3	7 ▲1	1 ▲1	4 ▲4	2	Labour
Norwich	13+1	39	Details	19	0	3	16	0	1	No overall control (Lab minority)	12 ▼7	0	3	21 ▲5	2 ▲2	1	Green
Pendle	10	33	Details	0	11	9	0	1	12	No overall control (Lib Dem/Ind coalition)	0	8 ▼3	7 ▼2	0	5 ▲4	13 ▲1	No overall control
Preston	16	48	Details	26	5	14	0	1	2	Labour	22 ▼4	3 ▼2	14	2 ▲2	5 ▲4	2	No overall control
Redditch	9	27	Details	18	5	0	1	0	3	Labour	13 ▼5	4 ▼1	0	0 ▼1	8 ▲8	2 ▼1	No overall control
Rochford	13+2	39	Details	0	10	8	1	0	20	No overall control (Con/Residents/ind. coalition)	0	7 ▼3	5 ▼3	0 ▼1	13 ▲13	14 ▼6	No overall control (Reform minority)
Rugby	14+1	42	Details	15	16	10	0	0	0	No overall control (Lab minority)	12 ▼3	15 ▼1	12 ▲2	0	3 ▲3	0	No overall control
Rushmoor	13+1	39	Details	16	14	3	1	0	4	No overall control (Lab minority)	17 ▲1	10 ▼4	3	0 ▼1	6 ▲6	3 ▼1	No overall control
St Albans	20+2	56	Details	2	4	43	3	0	2	Liberal Democrats	2	5 ▲1	44 ▲1	3	0	2	Liberal Democrats
Stevenage	13+1	39	Details	29	1	6	0	2	0	Labour	22 ▼7	1	6	0	10 ▲8	0	Labour
Tamworth	10	30	Details	16	4	0	1	1	8	Labour	14 ▼2	3 ▼1	0	1	10 ▲9	1 ▼1	No overall control (Labour minority)
Three Rivers	13	39	Details	3	11	19	3	0	3	No overall control (Lib Dem minority)	2 ▼1	14 ▲3	18 ▼1	3	0	2 ▼1	No overall control (Lib Dem minority)
Tunbridge Wells	13+2	39	Details	4	8	21	0	0	4	Liberal Democrats	3 ▼1	7 ▼1	25 ▲4	0	0	4	Liberal Democrats
Watford	12	36	Details	6	0	30	0	0	0	Liberal Democrats	4 ▼2	0	32 ▲2	0	0	0	Liberal Democrats
Welwyn Hatfield	16+1	48	Details	17	12 (Note: Includes a seat vacated shortly before the local elections following the death of the Conversative councillor)	15	2	0	2	No overall control (Lab/Lib Dem coalition)	16 ▼1	12	15	0 ▼2	3 ▲3	2	No overall control
West Lancashire	15	45	Details	21	14	0	0	0	10	No overall control (Lab minority)	13 ▼8	12 ▼2	0	0	7 ▲7	13 ▲3	No overall control
West Oxfordshire	16	49	Details	10	13	21	4	1	0	No overall control (Lib Dem/Lab/Grn coalition)	8 ▼2	16 ▲3	20 ▼1	4	1	0	No overall control (Lib Dem/Lab/Grn coalition)
Winchester	15	45	Details	0	8	32	4	0	1	Liberal Democrats	0	4 ▼4	36 ▲4	4	0	1	Liberal Democrats
Worthing	13	37	Details	21	9	0	2	2	3	Labour	15 ▼6	6 ▼3	1 ▲1	8 ▲6	5 ▲3	2 ▼1	No overall control (Labour minority)
38 councils	516+20	1,545															

== Standalone by-elections ==
On the same date, some by-elections took place in councils with no scheduled elections.

Council	Ward	Elected	Party
Chelmsford	Broomfield & The Walthams	Seena Shah	Conservative
Chesterfield	Staveley North	Steven Roy Barlow	Reform
Chesterfield	Staveley North	Dawn Taylor	Reform
East Hertfordshire	Little Hadham & The Pelhams	Jeff Jones	Conservative
Gloucestershire	St Mark's and St Peter's	Victoria Mae Atherstone	Liberal Democrats
Great Yarmouth	Caister South	Jon Wedon	Great Yarmouth First
Guildford	Onslow	James Steel	Liberal Democrats
Hertfordshire	Flamstead End and Turnford	Lesley Greensmyth	Conservative
Hertsmere	Bentley Heath & the Royds	John Martin Graham	Conservative
Horsham	Itchingfield, Slinfold and Warnham	Ross Dye	Conservative
Lewes	Newhaven South	James Harrison	Liberal Democrats
Lewes	Newhaven South	Jo Pettitt	Liberal Democrats
Mid Sussex	Hurstpierpoint	Lyn Joyce Williams	Liberal Democrats
Reigate and Banstead	Earlswood & Whitebushes	Robin Gordon Whitwell	Green
Rother	Rye & Winchelsea	Dan Bradley	Reform
Somerset	Mendip Hills	Sam Phripp	Liberal Democrats
Stratford-on-Avon	Bishops Itchington, Fenny Compton and Napton	Jake Beavan	Liberal Democrats
Surrey	Warlingham	Jacquie Thomson	Reform
West Northamptonshire	Hackleton & Roade	Laura Christine Weston	Reform
West Suffolk	Abbeygate	Dylan William Roques	Green
18 councils		20 councillors	

== Post-election vacancies ==
A number of seats remained vacant following the elections resulting in a number of post election vacancies:

- Moorside ward, Bury Council, death of candidate.
- Higham Ferrers ward, North Northamptonshire Council, death of candidate.
- Springfield ward, Essex County Council, death of candidate.
- Rayleigh West ward, Essex County Council and to the Sweyne Park and Grange ward for Rochford District Council, resignation of elected councillor within days of being elected.
- St Helens Town Centre, 2026 St Helens Metropolitan Borough Council election, death of candidate
- Hillingdon West ward, Hillingdon Council, death of candidate.
- North Acton ward, Ealing Council, resignation of elected councillor.
- High Fell ward, Gateshead Council, resignation of elected councillor.
- Old Catton ward, Norfolk County Council, resignation of elected councillor.
- City of Bradford Metropolitan District Council, three seats.

== Analysis ==
=== Fragmentation ===
Psephologist John Curtice said the results "confirmed the fragmentation of our politics" and that the projection was that Reform UK was ahead of the rest of parties and that each received similar levels of support; he noted that the results were "bleak" for Labour and the political parties do not have the "support of a substantial section of the public". The Projected National Share was calculated to show the support of the parties nationwide.

According to Sky News's 2026 National Equivalent Vote, Reform UK won 27% of the vote, the Conservatives won 20%, Labour won 15%, the Greens and Liberal Democrats each won 14%, and independents won 10%. Sky News added that these results were an improvement for the Conservatives from the previous year's local elections, while Reform "slid backwards slightly". If applied to the House of Commons, it was projected that Reform UK would have 284 seats, Labour 110, Conservatives 96, Liberal Democrats 80, SNP 36, Plaid Cymru 13, Green 13, and others 18. The BBC's Projected National Vote, a similar projection, put party support at Reform with 26%, Greens 18%, Labour 17%, Conservatives 17% and Liberal Democrats 16%.

=== Performances ===
Reform UK performed significantly well in areas where the vote for Brexit was high; in areas where Brexit reached over 55% support, Reform UK won 47% of the vote, while they won 36% in areas between 45–55%, and 19% in areas where support for Brexit dipped below 45%. Reform took many seats from Labour in their heartlands. In the case of the Conservatives, they lost the most support in areas that strongly supported them in elections beforehand, losing 12% in areas that gave them 35% of the vote share.

The Conservatives performed better than expected, even when suffering extensive losses, which led to Kemi Badenoch claiming that the Conservatives are "coming back". The BBC reported that there was no pressure to challenge Badenoch within leadership, even with these losses, and she also said that "good strategy takes time." Tony Travers, a local government expert at the London School of Economics, said that the "Tories have done surprisingly well" in places such Bexley, Westminster, and Wandsworth. Political analyst Peter Kellner also noted the Conservatives had a loss rate of 68% in 2025's elections, compared to 44% in 2026's elections. Political commentor Henry Hill pushed back against these interpretations, saying the Conservative Party is still going backward and "its councillor base is being eviscerated." The Conservative Party saw its fifth consecutive election where it lost seats.

The Labour Party suffered large losses in the councils that they controlled. In London, Labour performed particularly poorly. Labour lost control of Lambeth and Lewisham to the Green Party of England and Wales. In Northern England, Labour lost seats to Reform UK.

A record number of 466 Muslim candidates were elected to local government positions during these elections. Although most of them came from the Labour Party (199), the party in overall performed poorly in areas like Bradford, Birmingham, Blackburn with Darwen, Tower Hamlets, Newham and Redbrige that house large Muslim populations, where Muslim independents and the Green Party significantly eroded Labour's Muslim support base due to their singular-minded and antisemitic campaign on the Gaza war (with many Green Party candidates making antisemitic statements in the backdrop of widespread antisemitic violence in London), in addition to Islamist policy platforms like funding reconstruction in Gaza, boycotting Israeli technology, restricting the display of the Union Jack in Muslim-majority areas (as a fallback from a controversy in the previous year), criminalising depiction of Muhammad & desecration of the Quran ‐ a phenomenon described by Policy Exchange as 'Islamopopulism'.

== Opinion polls ==
=== Seat projections ===
Date(s) conducted	Pollster	Client	Sample size	Area	Lab	Con	LD	Grn	Ref	Others
7 May 2026	2026 local elections			England	1,068	801	844	587	1,454	248
April 2026	Britain Elects	n/a	TBD	England	616	754	741	1,087	1,689	183
April 2026	More in Common	n/a	TBD	England	458	507	990	1,096	1,515	448
Seats before					2,196	1,134	663	170	78	773

== Aftermath ==
=== Labour government ===
Asked whether he would resign, Keir Starmer called the election results "tough" but said, "I'm not going to walk away from those challenges and plunge the country into chaos". On 9 May 2026, Labour MP and former government minister Catherine West gave an interview in which she called on a cabinet minister to challenge Starmer for the leadership, in default of which she said that she would run against him.

Over the weekend following the election results, approximately 30 Labour MPs publicly called for a change within the leadership or a timetable for Starmer to resign as Prime Minister. Many other Labour MPs have also called on Starmer to resign.

On 11 May 2026, Catherine West pulled back from her challenge. Joe Morris, a ministerial aide to Wes Streeting, said that "regrettably, it is now clear that the prime minister no longer has the trust or confidence of the public". By that night, six Labour MPs had quit or been replaced as ministerial aides, and 72 MPs had publicly urged Starmer to either resign immediately set a timetable for his departure.

On 14 May, the Health Secretary Wes Streeting resigned from the Cabinet saying he had 'lost confidence' in Starmer's leadership. Later on the same day, Labour MP Josh Simons announced his resignation as Member of Parliament, triggering the 2026 Makerfield by-election so that the Mayor of Greater Manchester Andy Burnham can return to parliament and stand for the Labour leadership.

=== Opposition parties ===
==== Reform ====
Nigel Farage hailed Reform UK's results during this election as a "historic shift in British politics", also noting that this was a "complete reshaping of British politics in every way." Reform UK's home affairs spokesperson, Zia Yusuf, said that if these results were "replicated in the general election, Kemi Badenoch would lose her seat," referring to the current Tory leader.

==== Green ====
Zack Polanski, the leader of the Green Party, said that "two-party politics is not just dying, it is dead and it is buried," adding that he believes that Starmer "needs to go." He also said that "it's very clear that the new politics is the Green Party versus Reform."

== See also ==
- 2026 Gorton and Denton by-election
- 2026 Scottish Parliament election
- 2026 Senedd election
- Political make-up of local councils in the United Kingdom
