= London Green Party =

Regional party in London, England

- Chair: Eugene McCarthy
- Founded: July 1990
- Youth wing: London Young Greens
- Membership (April 2026): 40,000
- Ideology: Green politics Progressivism; Faction: Eco-socialism
- Political position: Left-wing
- National affiliation: Green Party of England and Wales
- European affiliation: European Green Party
- International affiliation: Global Greens
- Colours: Green
- House of Commons (London Seats): 0 / 75
- London Assembly: 3 / 25
- Local councillors in London: 279 / 1,817
- Council control in London: 6 / 32
- Directly-elected Mayors: 2 / 5

Website
- london.greenparty.org.uk

The London Green Party is the regional party of the Green Party of England and Wales that operates in Greater London. The party holds 3 of the 25 seats in the London Assembly and 279 of the 1,817 London borough councillors.

== Current representatives ==
=== London Assembly members ===
The London Green Party won 3 of 25 seats in the London Assembly at the 2024 London Assembly election. The table below shows the party's current Assembly Members (AMs).

AM	Constituency	First elected	Majority	Majority %
Caroline Russell	Additional members	2016	N/A	N/A
Zack Polanski	Additional members	2021	N/A	N/A
Benali Hamdache	Additional members	2024, co-opted in 2026	N/A	N/A

=== Directly-elected mayors ===
Mayor	Borough	First elected
Zoë Garbett	Hackney	7 May 2026
Liam Shrivastava	Lewisham	7 May 2026

=== Councillors ===
As of May 2026, Green Party representation on London Councils are:

Council	Councillors	
Barking and Dagenham	4 / 51	3rd
Barnet	1 / 63	3rd
Bexley	0 / 45	
Brent	9 / 57	4th
Bromley	0 / 58	
Camden	11 / 55	Official Opposition
Croydon	8 / 71	3rd
Ealing	5 / 70	4th
Enfield	5 / 63	3rd
Greenwich	13 / 55	Official Opposition
Hackney	42 / 57	Controlled Council
Hammersmith & Fulham	2 / 50	3rd
Haringey	28 / 57	1st (No overall control)
Harrow	0 / 55	
Havering	0 / 55	
Hillingdon	1 / 53	4th
Hounslow	3 / 62	4th
Islington	19 / 48	Official Opposition
Kensington and Chelsea	0 / 50	
Kingston upon Thames	0 / 48	
Lambeth	29 / 63	1st (No overall control)
Lewisham	40 / 54	Controlled council
Merton	0 / 57	
Newham	16 / 66	3rd
Redbridge	5 / 63	4th
Richmond upon Thames	0 / 54	
Southwark	22 / 63	2nd (No Overall Control, Green-Liberal Democrat coalition)
Sutton	0 / 55	
Tower Hamlets	5 / 45	Official Opposition
Waltham Forest	31 / 60	Controlled Council
Wandsworth	0 / 58	
Westminster	0 / 54	

== Electoral performance ==
=== UK general elections ===
The London Green Party won no constituencies at the 2024 general election.

The table below shows the London Green Party results at United Kingdom (UK) general elections since the London Government Act 1963 created the administrative area of Greater London in 1965. Results between February 1974 and October 1974 are for PEOPLE, results between 1979 and 1983 are for the Ecology Party, and results in 1987 are for the United Kingdom-wide Green Party. All UK general elections use first-past-the-post voting.

The party has never won any seats in London. The London Green Party won 10.0% of the vote at the most recent general election in 2024, its highest ever vote share.

Election	Leader(s) (Note: This post was known as Principal Speaker(s) until 2008.)		Votes			Seats		Status
Election	Leader(s)		No.	%	±	No.	±	Status
Feb-1974	Collective Leadership		619	<0.1	N/A	0 / 92	Steady	No seats
Oct-1974	Collective Leadership		997	<0.1	Steady	0 / 92	Steady	No seats
1979	Jonathon Porritt		5,071	0.1	▲0.1	0 / 92	Steady	No seats
1983	More Than Two Principal Speakers					0 / 84	Steady	No seats
1987	More Than Two Principal Speakers					0 / 84	Steady	No seats
1992	Jean Lambert	Richard Lawson				0 / 84	Steady	No seats
1997	Peg Alexander	David Taylor				0 / 74	Steady	No seats
2001	Margaret Wright	Mike Woodin				0 / 74	Steady	No seats
2005	Caroline Lucas	Keith Taylor	78,595	2.7		0 / 74	Steady	No seats
2010	Caroline Lucas		54,316	1.6	▼1.1	0 / 73	Steady	Opposition
2015	Natalie Bennett		171,670	4.9	▲3.3	0 / 73	Steady	Opposition
2017	Caroline Lucas	Jonathan Bartley	67,579	1.8	▼3.1	0 / 73	Steady	Opposition
2019	Siân Berry	Jonathan Bartley	115,527	3.1	▲1.3	0 / 73	Steady	Opposition
2024	Carla Denyer	Adrian Ramsay	334,791	10.0	▲6.9	0 / 75	Steady	Opposition

=== European Parliament elections ===
The London Green Party won no boroughs at the 2019 European Parliament election.

During the United Kingdom's membership of the European Union (1973–2020), Greater London participated in European Parliament elections, held every five years from 1979 until 2019. The table below shows the London Green Party results in elections to the European Parliament. Results between 1979 and 1984 are for the Ecology Party, while results in 1989 are for the United Kingdom-wide Green Party. From 1979 to 1994, London members of the European Parliament (MEPs) were elected from ten individual constituencies by first-past-the-post voting; from 1999 to 2019, MEPs were elected from a London-wide regional list by proportional representation.

The party's best results were at the 2009, 2014, and final 2019 European Parliament elections, when it won 1 of 8 seats in London.

Election	Leader(s)		Votes			Seats		Pos.
Election	Leader(s)		No.	%	±	No.	±	Pos.
1979	Jonathon Porritt		6,448	0.4	N/A	0 / 10	N/A	4th
1984	More Than Two Principal Speakers		26,132	1.6	▲1.1	0 / 10	Steady	4th
1989	More Than Two Principal Speakers		298,328	15.9	▲14.4	0 / 10	Steady	▲3rd
1994	John Cornford	Jan Clark	61,786	3.8	▼12.2	0 / 10	Steady	▼4th
1999	Mike Woodin	Jean Lambert	87,545	7.7	▲3.9	1 / 10	▲1	4th
2004	Mike Woodin	Caroline Lucas	158,986	8.4	▲0.8	1 / 9	Steady	▼5th
2009	Caroline Lucas		190,589	10.9	▲2.5	1 / 8	Steady	▲4th
2014	Natalie Bennett		196,419	8.9	▼2.0	1 / 8	Steady	4th
2019	Jonathan Bartley	Siân Berry	278,957	12.4	▲3.5	1 / 8	Steady	4th

=== Regional elections ===
==== Greater London Council elections ====
The table below shows the results obtained by the Ecology Party in elections to the Greater London Council (GLC). The GLC was the top-tier local government administrative body for Greater London from 1965 to 1986. It replaced the earlier London County Council which had covered a much smaller area. The GLC was dissolved in 1986 by the Local Government Act 1985 and its powers were devolved to the London boroughs and other entities. All GLC elections were conducted under the first-past-the-post voting system. The Ecology Party never won any seats on the GLC.

Election	Leader	Votes			Seats		Status
Election	Leader	No.	%	±	No.	±	Status
1977		298	< 0.1	N/A	0 / 92	N/A	No seats
1981		17,515	0.8	▲0.8	0 / 92	Steady	No seats

==== London Assembly elections ====
The London Green Party won three London-wide party list seats at the 2024 London Assembly election.

The table below shows the London Green Party results at London Assembly elections since the Greater London Authority was established in 2000. Assembly elections use the additional member system, a form of mixed member proportional representation, with 14 directly elected constituencies and 11 London-wide top-up seats.

The party's best results were at the 2000, 2021, and 2024 London Assembly elections, when it won 3 of 25 seats.

Election	Leader	Constituency			Party			Total Seats	±
Election	Leader	No.	%	Seats	No.	%	Seats	Total Seats	±
2000	Darren Johnson	162,457	10.2%	0 / 14	183,910	11.1%	3 / 11	3 / 25	N/A
2004	Darren Johnson	138,242	7.7%	0 / 14	160,445	8.6%	2 / 11	2 / 25	▼1
2008	Jenny Jones	194,059	8.1%	0 / 14	203,465	8.3%	2 / 11	2 / 25	Steady
2012	Jenny Jones	188,623	8.5%	0 / 14	189,215	8.5%	2 / 11	2 / 25	Steady
2016	Siân Berry	236,809	9.1%	0 / 14	207,959	8.0%	2 / 11	2 / 25	Steady
2021	Caroline Russell	336,840	13.0%	0 / 14	305,452	11.8%	3 / 11	3 / 25	▲1
2024	Caroline Russell	319,869	12.9%	0 / 14	286,746	11.6%	3 / 11	3 / 25	Steady

==== London Mayoral elections ====
The London Green Party won no London Assembly constituencies at the 2024 London mayoral election. Green on the inset map indicates constituencies where the London Green Party placed third.

The table below shows the London Green Party results in London Mayoral elections since the Greater London Authority was established in 2000. Elections between 2000 and 2021 were conducted using the supplementary vote system, which allowed voters to transfer votes from first to second preference candidates. The 2024 election used the first-past-the-post system.

The London Green Party has never won a London mayoral election. The party's best result was at the 2021 London mayoral election, when it won 7.8% of the first preference vote. The party won 5.8% of the vote at the most recent election in 2024.

Election	Candidate	1st Round			2nd Round			Result
Election	Candidate	No.	%	±	No.	%	±	Result
2000	Darren Johnson	38,121	2.2	N/A	Eliminated			Lost
2004	Darren Johnson	57,332	3.1	▲0.8	Eliminated			Lost
2008	Siân Berry	77,396	3.2	▲0.1	Eliminated			Lost
2012	Jenny Jones	98,913	4.5	▲1.3	Eliminated			Lost
2016	Siân Berry	150,673	5.8	▲1.3	Eliminated			Lost
2021	Siân Berry	197,976	7.8	▲2.0	Eliminated			Lost
2024	Zoë Garbett	145,114	5.8	▼2.0				Lost

=== Local elections ===
Date	Vote	% of Vote	Change	Councils	Change	Councillors	Change
1990	141,569	5.9%	▲4.7%	0	Steady	0	Steady
1994	48,798	2.2%	▼3.7%	0	Steady	0	Steady
1998	50,732	2.9%	▲0.7%	0	Steady	2	▲2
2002	95,394	5.5%	▲2.6%	0	Steady	1	▼1
2006	169,160	7.9%	▲2.4%	0	Steady	12	▲11
2010	248,175	6.6%	▼1.3%	0	Steady	2	▼10
2014	246,805	9.8%	▲3.2%	0	Steady	4	▲2
2018	211,170	8.6%	▼1.2%	0	Steady	11	▲7
2022	276,160	11.9%	▲3.3%	0	Steady	18	▲7
2026	305,156	22.3%	▲10.5%	0	Steady	266	▲248
