= 2026 Lewisham mayoral election =

Local election in England

- 7 May 2026

The Mayor of Lewisham
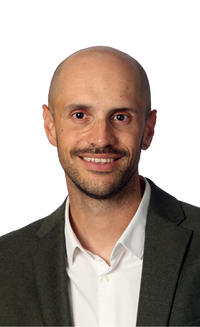
	First party	Second party	Third party
Candidate	Liam Shrivastava	Amanda De Ryk	Peter Newman
Party	Green	Labour	Reform
Last election	16.4%	51.8%	Did not stand
Popular vote	35,265	30,374	7,288
Percentage	40.4%	34.8%	8.4%
	Fourth party	Fifth party	Sixth party
Candidate	Josh Matthews	Sylbourne Sydial	Kayode Damali
Party	Liberal Democrats	Conservative	Independent
Last election	11.8%	9.1%	Did not stand
Popular vote	6,323	4,655	2,185
Percentage	7.3%	5.3%	2.5%
	Seventh party	Eighth party
Candidate	Jay Delaney Coward	Roger Mighton
Party	TUSC	Independent
Last election	Did not stand	Did not stand
Popular vote	721	392
Percentage	0.8%	0.4%
Mayor before election
Brenda Dacres
Labour
Mayor
Liam Shrivastava
Green

The 2026 Lewisham mayoral election was held on 7 May 2026 to elect the mayor of Lewisham, on the same date as the Lewisham local council election and other local elections across the country. The Green Party candidate Liam Shrivastava became the new mayor, winning with a vote of 40.4%. The previous mayor, Brenda Dacres of the Labour Party, did not stand after being offered a seat in the House of Lords.

Shrivastava is the first Green Party mayor elected in the party's history, alongside Zoë Garbett, who won the Hackney mayoral election.

== Background ==
The position of Mayor of Lewisham was created in 2002; Steve Bullock of the Labour Party won the mayoral elections in 2002, 2006, 2010, and 2014. He was succeeded by fellow Labour mayor Damien Egan in the 2018 and 2022 elections.

A mayoral by-election was triggered following Egan's resignation to stand in the 2024 Kingswood by-election. It was the first mayoral election run under first past the post rather than the prior use of supplementary vote. The winning candidate, Brenda Dacres, is the first black woman to serve as a directly elected mayor in the UK.

== Electoral system ==
The election uses the voting system of first past the post to elect the mayor, having been changed from the supplementary vote system in 2022. In first past the post, there is only one count, and the candidate with the most votes wins. The Electoral Reform Society described the move to first past the post as one lowering the bar for politicians and thus damaging British democracy.

== Candidates ==
The mayoral election had eight candidates; the Labour Party and Green Party were seen as the strongest contenders. Incumbent Labour mayor Brenda Dacres entered the House of Lords in January 2026 and did not run for reelection as mayor.
