= New Cross Gate (ward) =

Electoral ward in London, England

- Electoral ward for the Lewisham London Borough Council
- Borough: Lewisham
- County: Greater London
- Population: 11,077 (2021)
- Major settlements: New Cross Gate
- Area: 1.018 km²

Current electoral ward
- Created: 2022
- Number of members: 2
- Councillors: Aisha Malik-Smith; Liam Shrivastava

New Cross Gate is an electoral ward in the Borough of Lewisham. The ward was first used in the 2022 elections and elects two councillors to Lewisham London Borough Council.

== Geography ==
The ward is named after the New Cross Gate area.

== Councillors ==
Election	Councillors	
2022	Aisha Malik-Smith (Labour)	Liam Shrivastava (Labour) (Green since 2025)

== Elections ==
=== 2022 ===
New Cross Gate (2)
Party	Candidate	Votes	%	±%
Labour	Aisha Malik-Smith	1,410	82.4	
Labour	Liam Shrivastava	890	52.0	
Green	Hudson Rolfe	473	27.6	
Conservative	Alexander Gill	166	9.7	
Liberal Democrats	Linda Hawkins	165	9.6	
TUSC	Jay Coward	132	7.7	
Conservative	Wendy Statham	100	5.8	
Liberal Democrats	Richard Hebditch	86	5.0	
Turnout			29.3	
Labour win (new seat)				
Labour win (new seat)				
