= 2026 Hackney mayoral election =

Local election in England

- 7 May 2026

The Mayor of Hackney
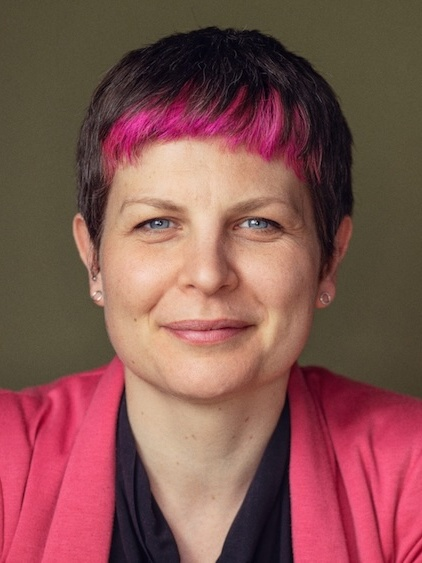

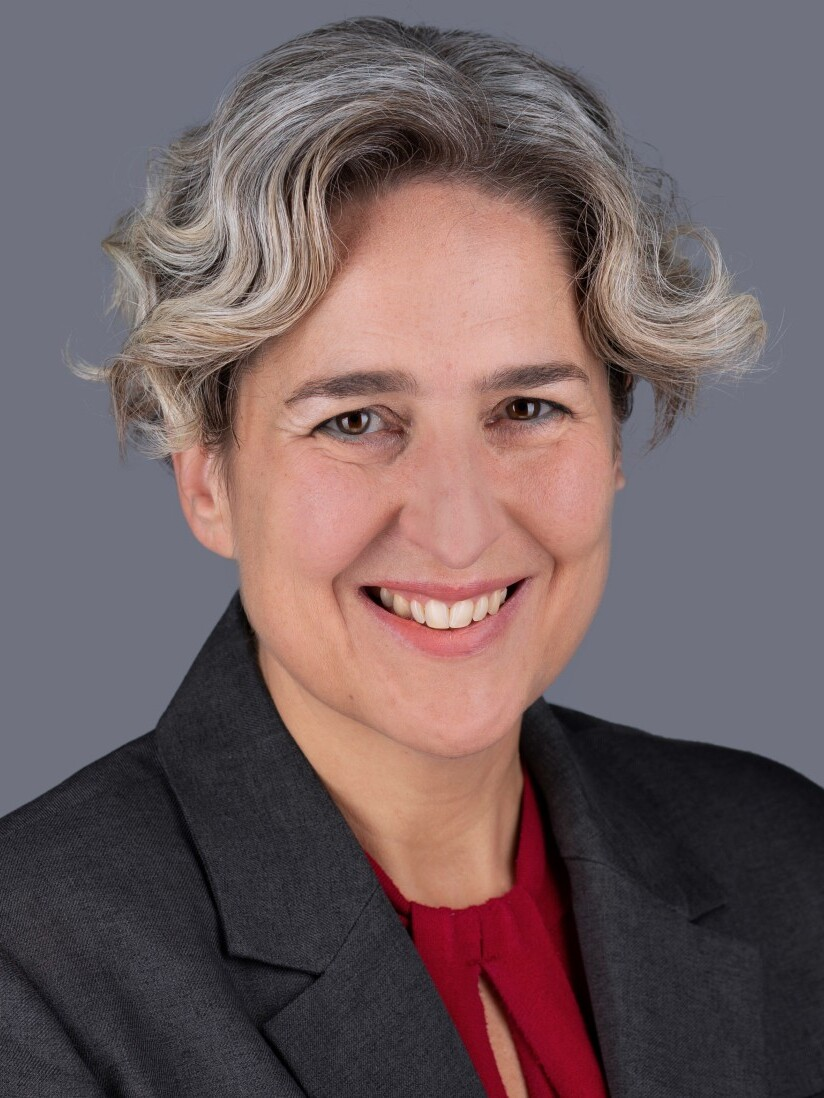

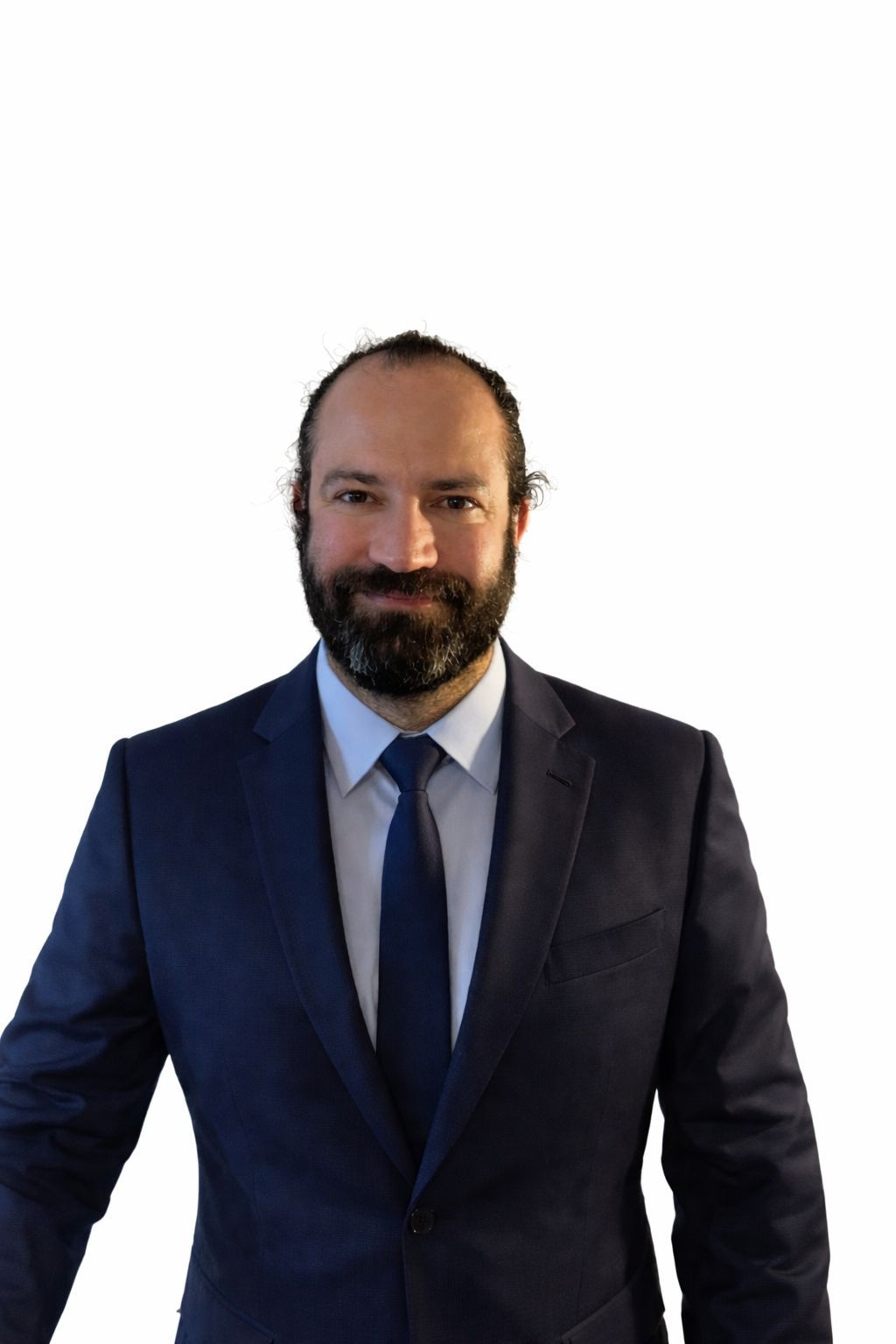
	First party	Second party	Third party
Candidate	Zoë Garbett	Caroline Woodley	Tareke Gregg
Party	Green	Labour	Conservative
Last election	24.5%	49.8%	13.6%
Popular vote	35,720	26,865	6,345
Percentage	47.2%	35.5%	8.4%
Swing	▲22.7	▼13.3	▼5.2
	Fourth party	Fifth party
Candidate	Vahid Almasi	Eva Steinhardt
Party	Reform	Liberal Democrats
Last election	Did not stand	5.1%
Popular vote	4,013	2,731
Percentage	5.3%	3.6%
Swing	New	▼1.5
Mayor before election
Caroline Woodley
Labour
Mayor
Zoë Garbett
Green

The 2026 Hackney mayoral election was held on 7 May 2026 to elect the mayor of Hackney, on the same date as the Hackney local council election and other local elections across the country. The election was won by Zoë Garbett of the Green Party. Garbett is the Green Party's first elected mayor, alongside Liam Shrivastava, who won the Lewisham mayoral election held on the same day.

== Background ==
The position of Mayor of Hackney was established in 2002. Jules Pipe of the Labour Party won the mayoral elections in 2002, 2006, 2010, and 2014; he resigned in 2016 and was succeeded as mayor by fellow Labour politician Philip Glanville in 2016 mayoral by-election. Glanville was reelected in the 2018 and 2022 elections, and then resigned in 2023 following a scandal. Caroline Woodley, also of Labour, was elected mayor in the 2023 by-election, and is seeking reelection in 2026.

== Electoral system ==
The election uses the voting system of first past the post to elect the mayor, having been changed from the supplementary vote system in 2022. In first past the post, there is only one count, and the candidate with the most votes wins. The Electoral Reform Society described the move to first past the post as one lowering the bar for politicians and thus damaging British democracy.

== Candidates ==
The mayoral election had five candidates. The Green Party's Zoë Garbett was seen as the strongest challenger to Labour's Caroline Woodley.
