= Lewisham London Borough Council =

Local authority in England

- Coat of Arms

- Logo

Type
- Type: London borough council of the London Borough of Lewisham
- Houses: Unicameral

Leadership
- Speaker: Aaron Regisford, Green since 20 May 2026
- Mayor: Liam Shrivastava, Green Party since 11 May 2026
- Chief Executive: Jennifer Daothong since April 2023

Structure
- Seats: 54 councillors plus elected mayor
- Political groups: Administration (40) Green (40) Opposition (14) Labour (14)
- Length of term: Whole council elected every four years

Elections
- Voting system: Plurality at-large (FPTP)
- Last election: 7 May 2026
- Next election: 2 May 2030

Meeting place
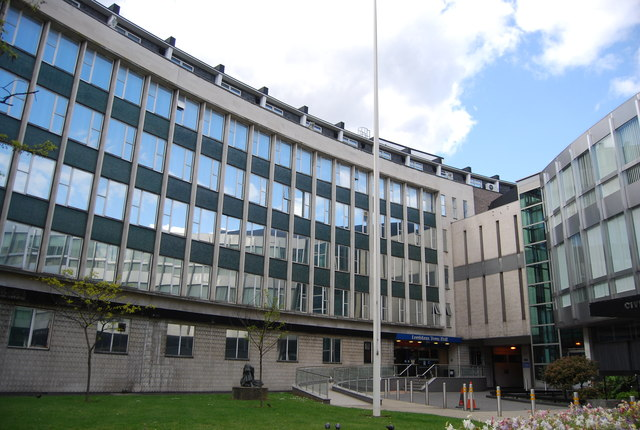
- Town Hall, Catford Road, London, SE6 4RU

Website
- www.lewisham.gov.uk

Lewisham London Borough Council, also known as Lewisham Council, is the local authority for the London Borough of Lewisham in Greater London, England. The council is responsible for providing certain services within the borough. The council came under a Green majority control in 2026 It has been led by a directly elected mayor since 2002. The council meets at Lewisham Town Hall in the Catford area of the borough.

== History ==
There has been an elected Lewisham local authority since 1856 when the Lewisham District was created, covering the ancient parish of Lewisham and the hamlet of Penge, governed by an elected board. It was one of the lower tier authorities within the area of the Metropolitan Board of Works, which was established to provide services across the metropolis of London. In 1889 the Metropolitan Board of Works' area was made the County of London. In 1900 the lower tier was reorganised into metropolitan boroughs, each with a borough council, one of which was called Lewisham. The borough covered a different area to the old Lewisham District; Penge was transferred to Kent, but the new borough gained the parish of Lee.

The larger London Borough of Lewisham and its council were created under the London Government Act 1963, with the first election held in 1964. For its first year the council acted as a shadow authority alongside the area's outgoing authorities, being the councils of the two metropolitan boroughs of Lewisham and Deptford. The new council formally came into its powers on 1 April 1965, at which point the old boroughs and their councils were abolished.

The council's full legal name is "The Mayor and Burgesses of the London Borough of Lewisham", but it styles itself Lewisham Council.

From 1965 until 1986 the council was a lower-tier authority, with upper-tier functions provided by the Greater London Council. The split of powers and functions meant that the Greater London Council was responsible for "wide area" services such as fire, ambulance, flood prevention, and refuse disposal; with the boroughs (including Lewisham) responsible for "personal" services such as social care, libraries, cemeteries and refuse collection. The Greater London Council was abolished in 1986 and its functions passed to the London Boroughs, with some services provided through joint committees. Lewisham became a local education authority in 1990 when the Inner London Education Authority was dissolved.

Since 2000 the Greater London Authority has taken some responsibility for highways and planning control from the council, but within the English local government system the council remains a "most purpose" authority in terms of the available range of powers and functions.

=== Data protection ===
In 2012 the Council was fined £70,000 by the Information Commissioner's Office (ICO) after a social worker "left files containing GP and police reports and allegations of sexual abuse and neglect in a shopping bag on a train". Commenting on Lewisham and other authorities who had made similar data protection breaches, the ICO said "It would be far too easy to consider these breaches as simple human error. The reality is that they are caused by councils treating sensitive personal data in the same routine way they would deal with more general correspondence. Far too often in these cases, the councils do not appear to have acknowledged that the data they are handling is about real people, and often the more vulnerable members of society." In August 2015, it was reported by the News Shopper that between April 2011 and April 2014, Lewisham Council had disclosed the public's sensitive data 64 times, whereas the neighbouring councils of Bexley, Bromley and Greenwich had not committed any data breaches in that period.

== Governance ==
The local authority derives its powers and functions from the London Government Act 1963 and subsequent legislation, and has the powers and functions of a London borough council. It sets council tax and as a billing authority also collects precepts for Greater London Authority functions and business rates. It sets planning policies which complement Greater London Authority and national policies, and decides on almost all planning applications accordingly. It is also the local education authority.

=== Political control ===
Following the 2026 local elections the council came under a Green majority for the first time.

The first election was held in 1964, initially operating as a shadow authority alongside the outgoing authorities until it came into its powers on 1 April 1965. Political control of the council since 1965 has been as follows:

Party in control	Years
Labour	1965–1968
Conservative	1968–1971
Labour	1971–2006
No overall control	2006–2010
Labour	2010–2026
Green	2026–present

=== Leadership ===
Prior to 2002, political leadership was provided by the leader of the council. The leaders from 1965 to 2002 were:

Councillor	Party	From	To
Fred Winslade	Labour	1965	1968
Norman Banks	Conservative	1968	1971
Andy Hawkins	Labour	1971	1984
Ron Stockbridge	Labour	1984	1985
Dave Sullivan	Labour	1985	1988
Steve Bullock	Labour	1988	1993
Margaret Moran	Labour	1993	1995
Jim Mallory	Labour	1995	1998
Dave Sullivan	Labour	1998	2002

In 2002 the council changed to having a directly elected Mayor of Lewisham as its political leader, after which the former ceremonial role of mayor was initially renamed the chair, subsequently becoming the speaker. The directly elected mayors since 2002 have been: (Note: Mayoral terms of office run from the fourth day after polling day.)

Councillor	Party	From	To
Steve Bullock	Labour	6 May 2002	6 May 2018
Damien Egan	Labour	7 May 2018	10 Jan 2024
Brenda Dacres	Labour	8 Mar 2024	10 May 2026
Liam Shrivastava	Green	11 May 2026	

=== Composition ===
At the 2026 election, the Green Party gained control of the council from Labour, winning 40 seats, with Labour winning 14. The current composition of the council, excluding the elected mayor's seat, is:

Party	Councillors
Green	40
Labour	14
Total	54

The next election is due in May 2030.

== Premises ==
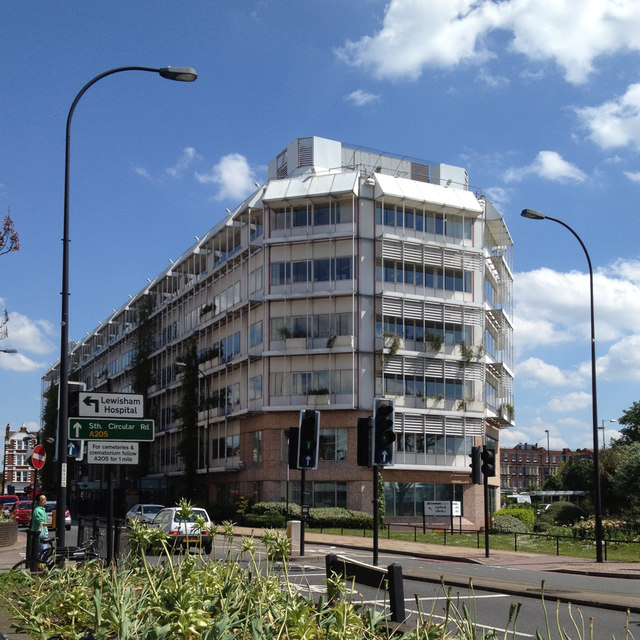
Laurence House, 1 Catford Road, London, SE6 4RU: Council's additional offices opposite the Town Hall

The council meets at Lewisham Town Hall on Catford Road in the Catford area. The first town hall on the site was completed in 1875 for the old Lewisham District Board of Works. A large extension to the east was added in 1932, comprising a concert hall and municipal offices with a distinctive curved frontage facing Rushey Green. A new office wing was subsequently added to the west, being completed in 1963. The original 1875 part of the building was then demolished and replaced by a new civic suite, including the council chamber, which was completed in 1971.

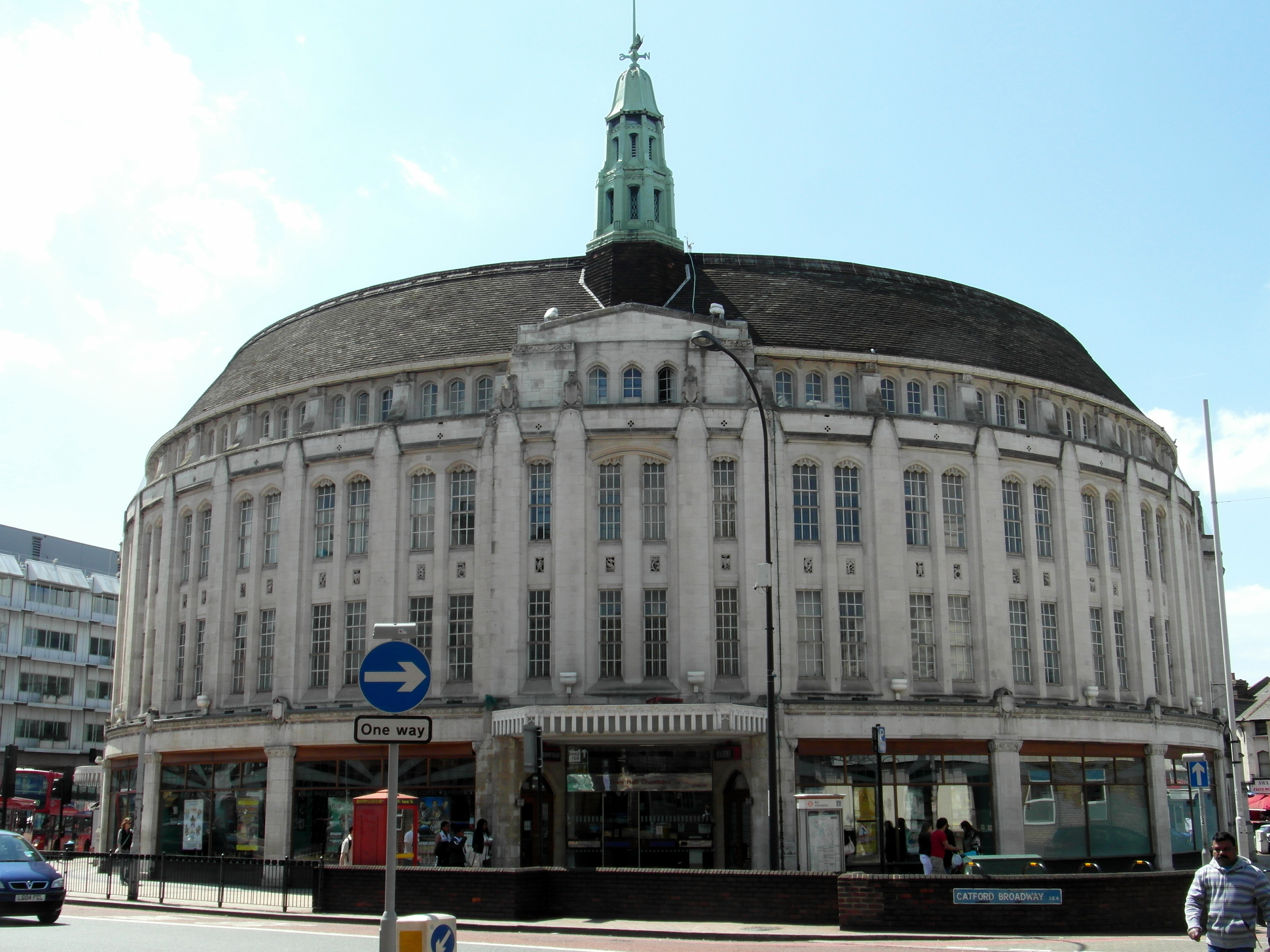
Town Hall Chambers: Council's offices 1932–2020

In 2020 the council vacated the 1932 municipal offices, by then known as Town Hall Chambers, having consolidated its offices in the 1963 and 1971 wings of the Town Hall and at a 1960s office building called Laurence House on the opposite side of Catford Road.

== Wards ==
The wards of Lewisham and the number of seats:

1. Bellingham (2)
2. Blackheath (3)
3. Brockley (3)
4. Catford South (3)
5. Crofton Park (3)
6. Deptford (3)
7. Downham (3)
8. Evelyn (3)
9. Forest Hill (3)
10. Grove Park (3)
11. Hither Green (3)
12. Ladywell (3)
13. Lee Green (3)
14. Lewisham Central (2)
15. New Cross Gate (2)
16. Perry Vale (3)
17. Rushey Green (3)
18. Sydenham (3)
19. Telegraph Hill (3)

== Elections ==
Since the last boundary changes in 2022, the council has comprised the elected mayor plus 54 councillors representing 19 wards, with each ward electing two or three councillors. Elections are held every four years.
