= Mayor of Lewisham =

Directly elected mayor of Lewisham

- Arms of Lewisham London Borough Council

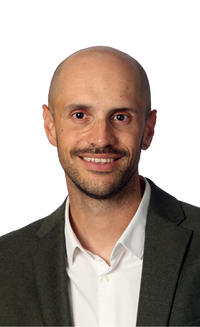
- Incumbent; Liam Shrivastava since 11 May 2026
- Style: No courtesy title or style
- Appointer: Electorate of Lewisham
- Term length: Four years
- Inaugural holder: Steve Bullock

The mayor of Lewisham is a directly elected local authority mayor responsible for the executive function of Lewisham London Borough Council in London. The role was established in 2002 following a referendum the previous year.

Damien Egan resigned the post on 10 January 2024 in order to contest the 2024 Kingswood by election. In the resulting by-election, Brenda Dacres was elected as Egan's successor.

== Referendum ==
Mayor of Lewisham referendum 18 October 2001
Choice	Votes	%
Elected Mayor	16,822	51.39
Cabinet System	15,914	48.61
Required majority		50
Total	32,736	100.00
Registered voters/turnout		18.3
Source: House of Commons Library and The Guardian

== Elections ==
Elections from 2002 to 2022 were held under the supplementary vote system. Following the enactment of the Elections Act 2022, subsequent elections are held under first-past-the-post.

=== 2002 election ===
Lewisham Mayoral Election 2 May 2002
Party	Candidate	1st round		2nd round			1st round votesTransfer votes, 2nd round
Party	Candidate	Total	Of round	Transfers	Total	Of round	1st round votesTransfer votes, 2nd round
Labour	Steve Bullock	13,473	35.5%	4,509	17,982	59.4%	
Conservative	Derek Stone	8,004	21.1%	4,276	12,280	40.6%	
Liberal Democrats	Alexander Feakes	7,276	19.2%				
Green	Sinna Mani	5,517	14.5%				
Local Education Action by Parents	Marie-Louise Irvine	3,710	9.8%				
Labour win							

=== 2006 election ===
Lewisham Mayoral Election 4 May 2006
Party	Candidate	1st round		2nd round			1st round votesTransfer votes, 2nd round
Party	Candidate	Total	Of round	Transfers	Total	Of round	1st round votesTransfer votes, 2nd round
Labour	Steve Bullock	22,155	37.7%	2,974	25,129	57.1%	
Liberal Democrats	Christopher Maines	12,398	21.1%	6,491	18,889	42.9%	
Conservative	James Cleverly	10,790	18.4%				
Green	Michael Keogh	7,168	12.2%				
Independent	John Hamilton	4,823	8.2%				
Lewisham Peoples' Alliance	Sinna Mani	1,366	2.3%				
Labour hold							

=== 2010 election ===
Lewisham Mayoral Election 6 May 2010
Party	Candidate	1st round		2nd round			1st round votesTransfer votes, 2nd round
Party	Candidate	Total	Of round	Transfers	Total	Of round	1st round votesTransfer votes, 2nd round
Labour	Steve Bullock	47,861	44.5%	4,670	52,531	59.0%	
Liberal Democrats	Christopher Maines	26,445	24.6%	10,001	36,446	41.0%	
Conservative	Simon Nundy	16,276	15.1%				
Green	Dean Walton	6,560	6.1%				
People Before Profit	John Hamilton	5,964	5.5%				
BNP	Tess Culnane	2,904	2.7%				
English Democrat	Graham Dare	1,559	1.4%				
Labour hold							

=== 2014 election ===
Lewisham Mayoral Election 22 May 2014
Party	Candidate	1st round		2nd round			1st round votesTransfer votes, 2nd round
Party	Candidate	Total	Of round	Transfers	Total	Of round	1st round votesTransfer votes, 2nd round
Labour	Steve Bullock	36,659	50.77%				
Conservative	Simon Nundy	8,041	11.14%				
Liberal Democrats	Duwayne Brooks	7,234	10.02%				
Green	Mike Keogh	7,224	10.00%				
People Before Profit	John Hamilton	6,014	8.33%				
UKIP	Peter Lello	5,684	7.87%				
TUSC	Chris Flood	1,354	1.88%				
Labour hold							

=== 2018 election ===
Lewisham Mayoral Election 3 May 2018
Party	Candidate	1st round		2nd round			1st round votesTransfer votes, 2nd round
Party	Candidate	Total	Of round	Transfers	Total	Of round	1st round votesTransfer votes, 2nd round
Labour Co-op	Damien Egan	39,951	54.3%				
Conservative	Ross Archer	9,790	13.3%				
Green	John Coughlin	7,649	10.4%				
Liberal Democrats	Chris Maines	6,065	8.2%				
Independent	Duwayne Brooks	5,480	7.4%				
People Before Profit	John Hamilton	4,193	5.7%				
Democrats and Veterans	Will Donnelly	445	0.6%				
Labour hold							

=== 2022 election ===
Lewisham Mayoral Election 5 May 2022
Party	Candidate	1st round		2nd round			1st round votesTransfer votes, 2nd round
Party	Candidate	Total	Of round	Transfers	Total	Of round	1st round votesTransfer votes, 2nd round
Labour Co-op	Damien Egan	39,966	58.05%				
Green	Nick Humberstone	10,987	15.96%				
Conservative	Caroline Louise Attfield	7,980	11.59%				
Liberal Democrats	Chris Maines	6,736	9.78%				
TUSC	Andy Beadle	1,620	2.35%				
CPA	Maureen Maud Martin	1,009	1.47%				
Independent	Roger NM Mighton	549	0.80%				
Labour Co-op hold							

=== 2024 by-election ===
The by-election was triggered following the resignation of Damien Egan to stand in the 2024 Kingswood by-election. It was the first election run under first-past-the-post rather than the prior use of supplementary vote. The winning candidate, Brenda Dacres, is the second black woman to serve as a directly elected mayor in the UK. The election had a low turnout of 20.73%.

Lewisham mayoral election, 7 March 2024
Party	Candidate	Votes	%	±%
Labour Co-op	Brenda Dacres	21,576	51.8	▼6.2
Green	Michael Herron	6,835	16.4	▲0.5
Liberal Democrats	Chris Maines	4,896	11.8	▲2.0
Conservative	Siama Qadar	3,784	9.1	▼2.5
Workers Party	John Hamilton	2,378	5.7	New
CPA	Maureen Martin	1,233	3.0	▲1.5
Independent	Nick Long	917	2.2	New
Majority		14,741	35.4	▼6.6
Turnout		41,619	20.7	▼14.3
Labour Co-op hold		Swing	▼3.4	

=== 2026 election ===
Lewisham mayoral election, 7 May 2026
Party	Candidate	Votes	%	±%
Green	Liam Shrivastava	35,265	40.4	▲24
Labour Co-op	Amanda De Ryk	30,374	34.8	▼17
Reform	Pete Newman	7,288	8.4	New
Liberal Democrats	Josh Matthews	6,323	7.3	▼4.5
Conservative	Sylbourne Sydial	4,655	5.3	▼3.8
Independent	Kayode Damali	2,185	2.5	New
TUSC	Jay Delaney Coward	721	0.8	New
Independent	Roger Mighton	392	0.5	New
Majority		4,891	5.6	New
Turnout		87,203	42.2	▲109.5
Green gain from Labour Co-op		Swing	▲20.5	
