= Brenda Dacres, Baroness Dacres of Lewisham =

Mayor of Lewisham from 2024 to 2026)

The Right Honourable The Baroness Dacres of Lewisham
- Official portrait, 2026

Mayor of Lewisham
- In office 8 March 2024 – 11 May 2026
- Preceded by: Damien Egan
- Succeeded by: Liam Shrivastava

Member of the House of Lords
- Lord Temporal
- Life peerage 7 January 2026

Personal details
- Born: November 1966 (age 59–60)
- Party: Labour

Brenda Vanessa Dacres, Baroness Dacres of Lewisham OBE (born November 1966) is a British Labour and Co-operative Party politician who was Mayor of Lewisham from 2024 to 2026. In 2024, she became the first black woman to be elected Mayor of Lewisham, and the second black woman directly elected mayor in England after Joanne Anderson.

== Early life ==
Dacres was born to working class Windrush generation parents.

== Career ==
She formerly served as mayor and deputy mayor and on Lewisham London Borough Council. She was elected in New Cross ward in 2014 and 2018 and Deptford ward in 2022. She first stood in 2017 for selection as the Labour candidate for Mayor of Lewisham but was beaten by Damien Egan, who was subsequently elected as Mayor in 2018.

Dacres applied to be the Labour candidate in the 2018 Lewisham East by-election. She was a supporter of the Labour for free movement campaign. She appeared on an all ethnic minority women shortlist but was beaten by Janet Daby.

In 2024, she was elected Mayor of Lewisham. The by-election was called after Damien Egan was elected to Parliament in the 2024 Kingswood by-election.

In 2025, she was appointed an OBE. As part of the 2025 Political Peerages, she was created a life peer as Baroness Dacres of Lewisham, of Deptford in the London Borough of Lewisham, on 7 January 2026. Baroness Dacres subsequently has announced her intention not to restand as Labour's candidate for Mayor of Lewisham.

On 21 July 2026, she was appointed to the Burnham ministry as a Baroness in Waiting.
