= Liam Shrivastava =

British politician (born 1989)

Mayor Liam Shrivastava
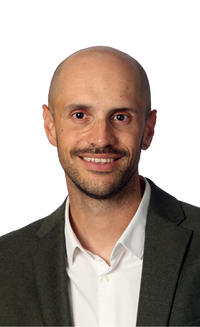
- Shrivastava in 2026

Mayor of Lewisham
- Incumbent
- Assumed office 11 May 2026
- Preceded by: Brenda Dacres

Lewisham Borough Councillor for New Cross Gate ward
- In office 5 May 2022 – 7 May 2026

Lewisham Borough Councillor for Crofton Park ward
- Incumbent
- Assumed office 7 May 2026

Personal details
- Party: Green Party of England and Wales
- Other political affiliations: Labour (until 2025)
- Education: Goldsmiths, University of London (MA)
- Website: liam4lewisham.com

Liam Shrivastava is a British politician who has served as the Mayor of Lewisham for the Green Party since 2026. He was previously a Labour Party councillor for the New Cross Gate ward of Lewisham London Borough Council, having been elected in the 2022 election, until defecting to the Green Party in June 2025.

== Early life and education ==
Shrivastava is originally from Sheffield, in South Yorkshire. He completed a Master of Arts (MA) in Political Communications at Goldsmiths, University of London.

== Career ==
Liam Shrivastava was elected Mayor of Lewisham on 7 May 2026.
