= 2024 Kingswood by-election =

UK parliamentary by-election

- 15 February 2024

Kingswood constituency
- Turnout: 37.1% (▼34.4 pp)
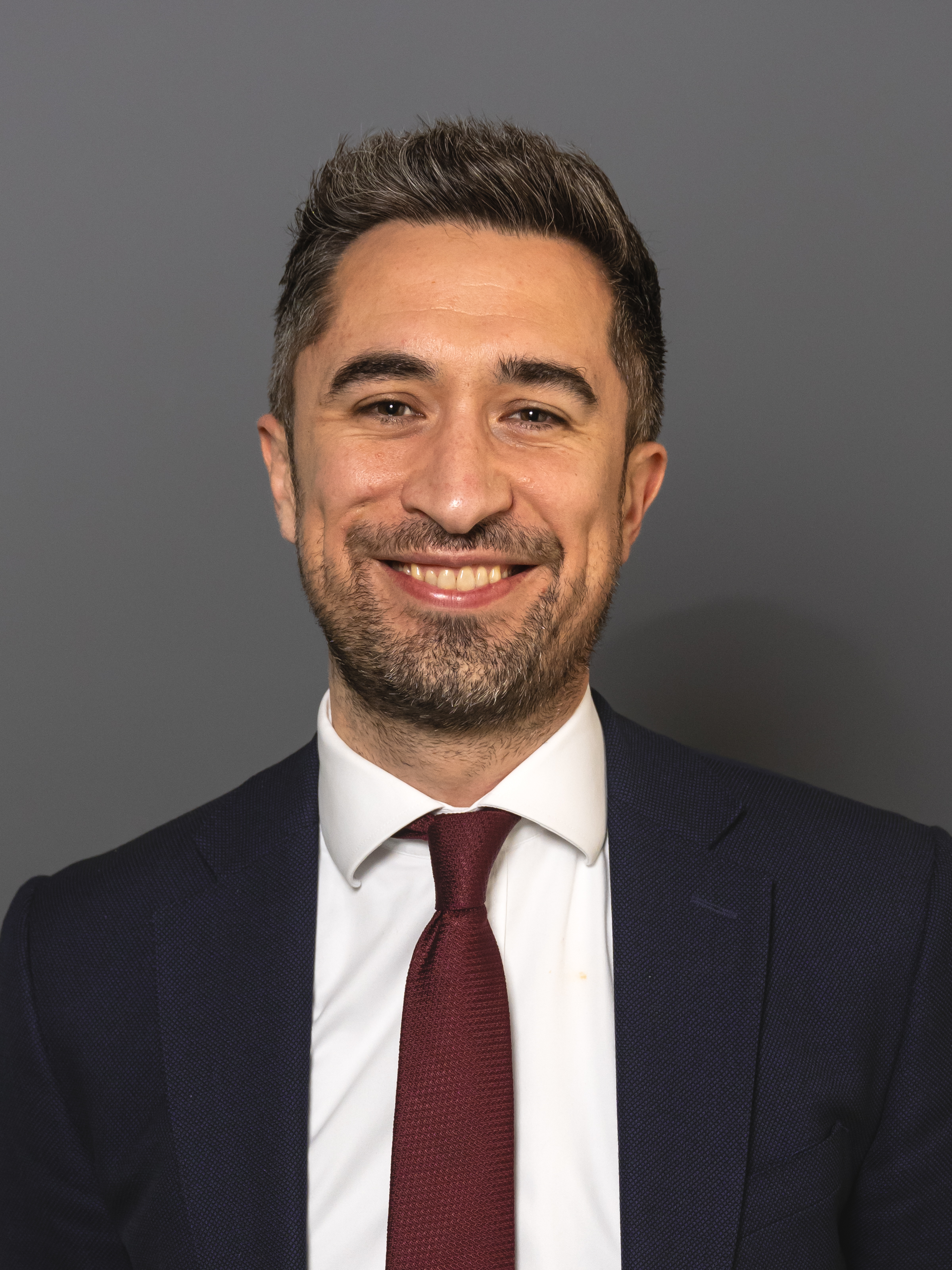

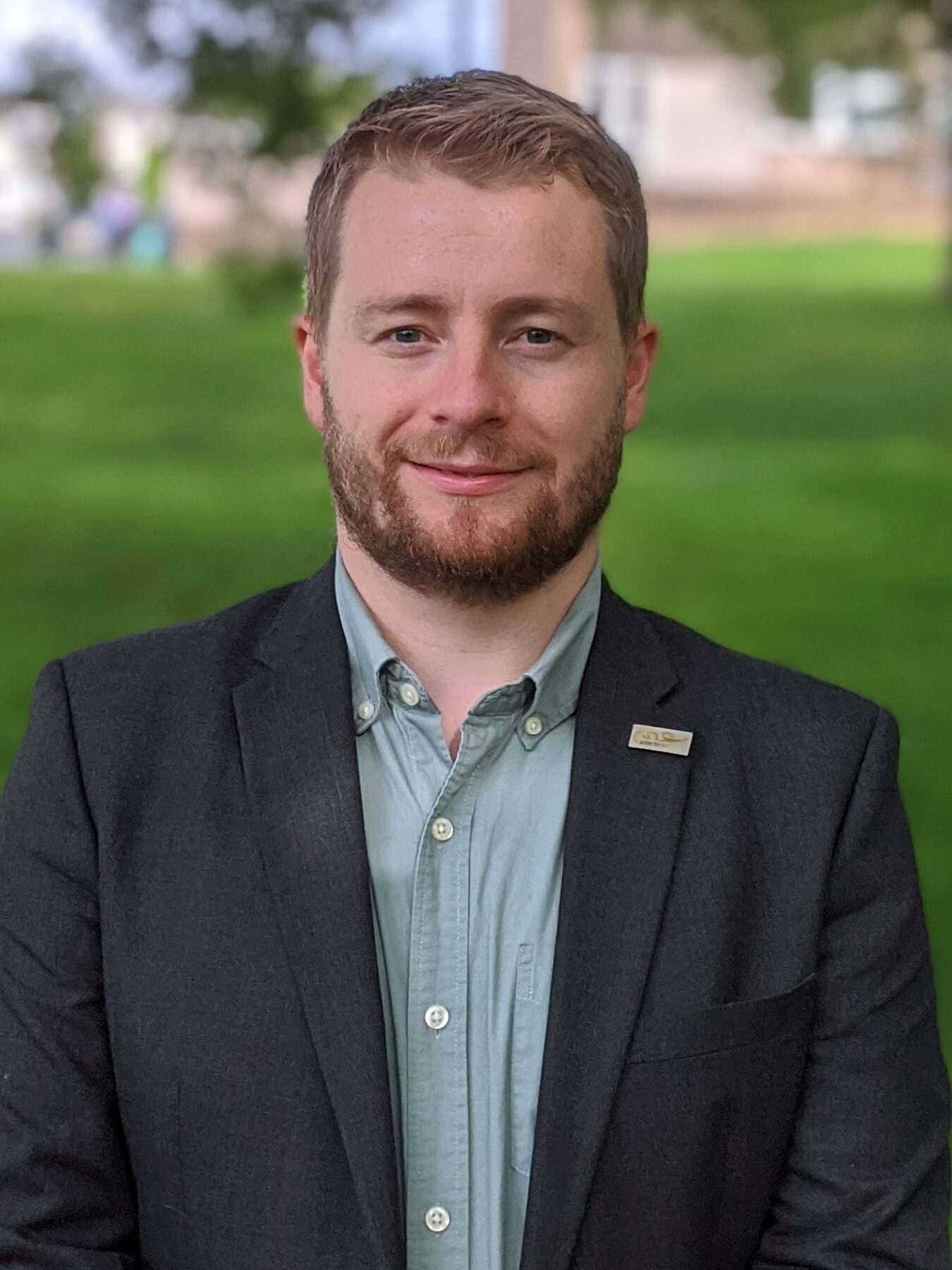

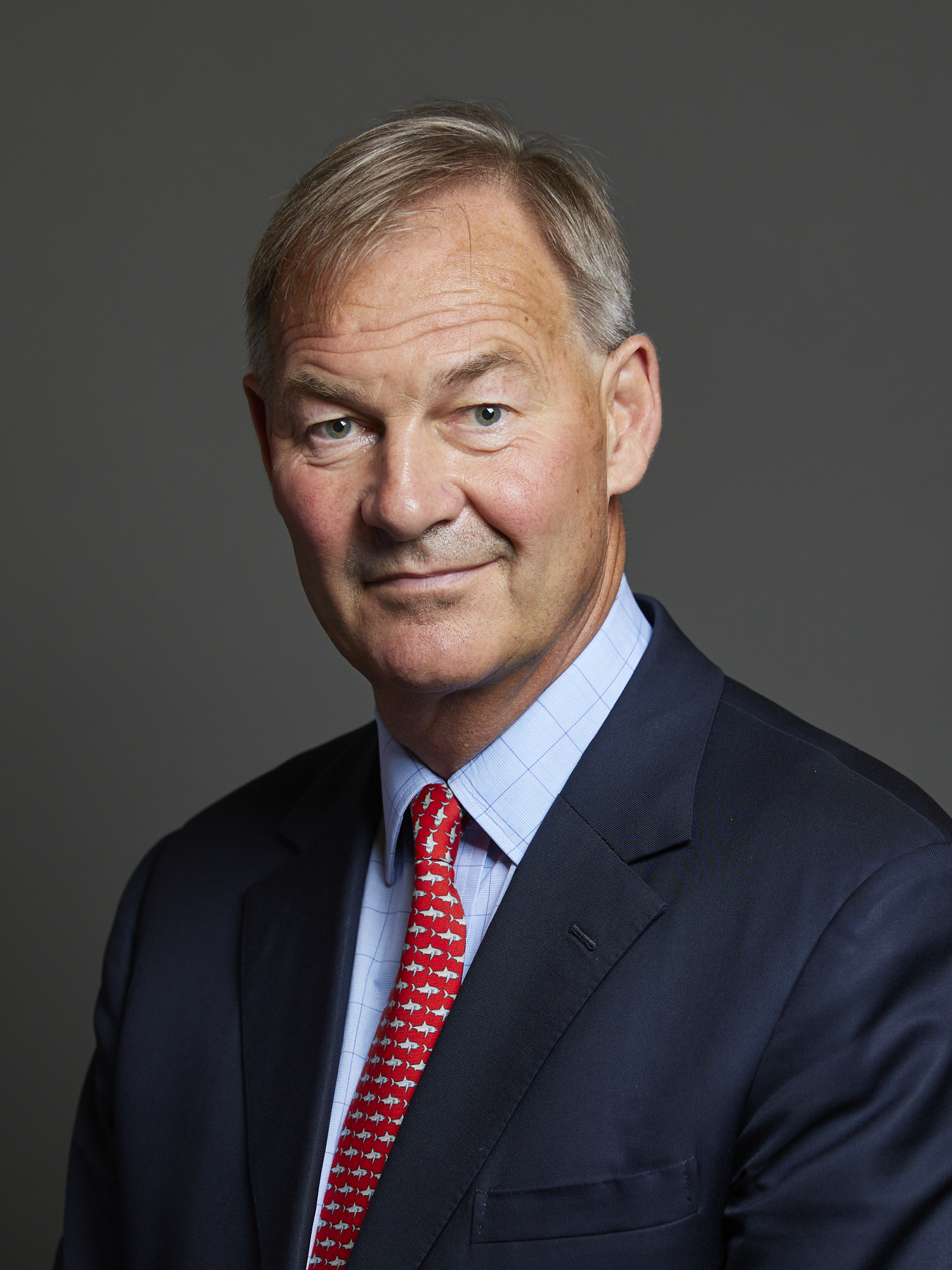

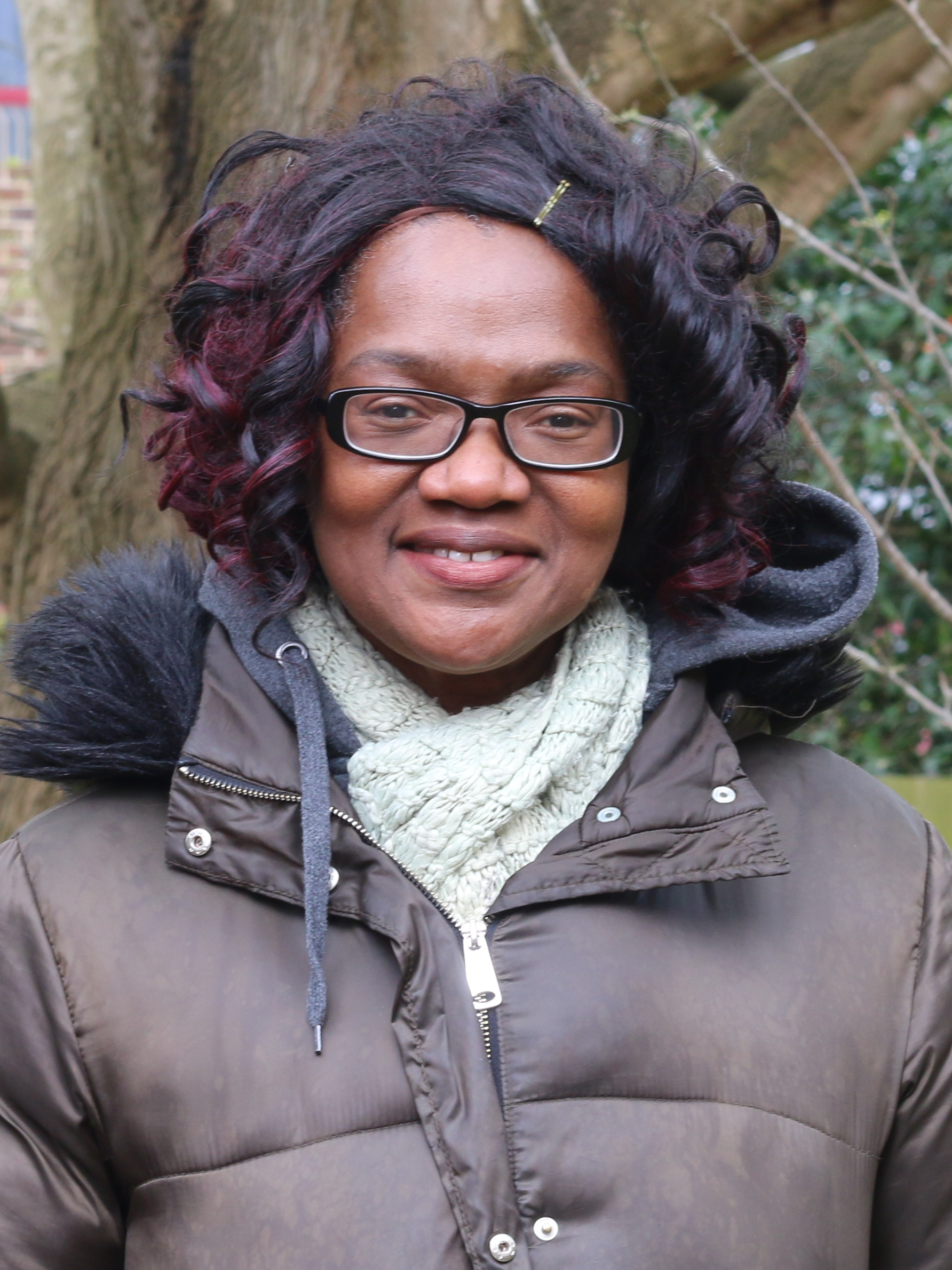
	First party	Second party
Candidate	Damien Egan	Sam Bromiley
Party	Labour	Conservative
Popular vote	11,176	8,675
Percentage	44.9%	34.9%
Swing	▲11.5 pp	▼21.3 pp
	Third party	Fourth party
Candidate	Rupert Lowe	Lorraine Francis
Party	Reform	Green
Popular vote	2,578	1,450
Percentage	10.4%	5.8%
Swing	New	▲3.4 pp
- Boundary of the Kingswood constituency in Avon
MP before election
Chris Skidmore
Independent (Note: Skidmore resigned from the Conservative Party when announcing his resignation from Parliament, meaning that he was nominally an independent MP when the latter was effected)
Elected MP
Damien Egan
Labour

A by-election for the United Kingdom parliamentary constituency of Kingswood was held on 15 February 2024, following the resignation of incumbent Conservative MP Chris Skidmore. The election was won by Damien Egan of the Labour Party with a 16% swing. The turnout was 37.1%.

Skidmore announced his resignation on 5 January 2024 in protest at the UK government's decision to issue more oil and gas licences. He formally resigned as a member of Parliament three days later on 8 January.

The by-election took place on the same day as the Wellingborough by-election, also gained by Labour from the Conservatives.

== Constituency ==
The Kingswood constituency in South Gloucestershire had been won by the main party of government since its creation in February 1974, except for 1992. It voted Leave in the 2016 EU referendum by a margin of 58% to 42%.

In the 2023 Periodic Review of Westminster constituencies, Kingswood was set to be split between three seats: North East Somerset and Hanham, Bristol North East, and Filton and Bradley Stoke. The new boundaries did not impact the by-election, instead taking effect at the 2024 general election. Egan had already been selected as the Labour candidate for Bristol North East.

== Background ==
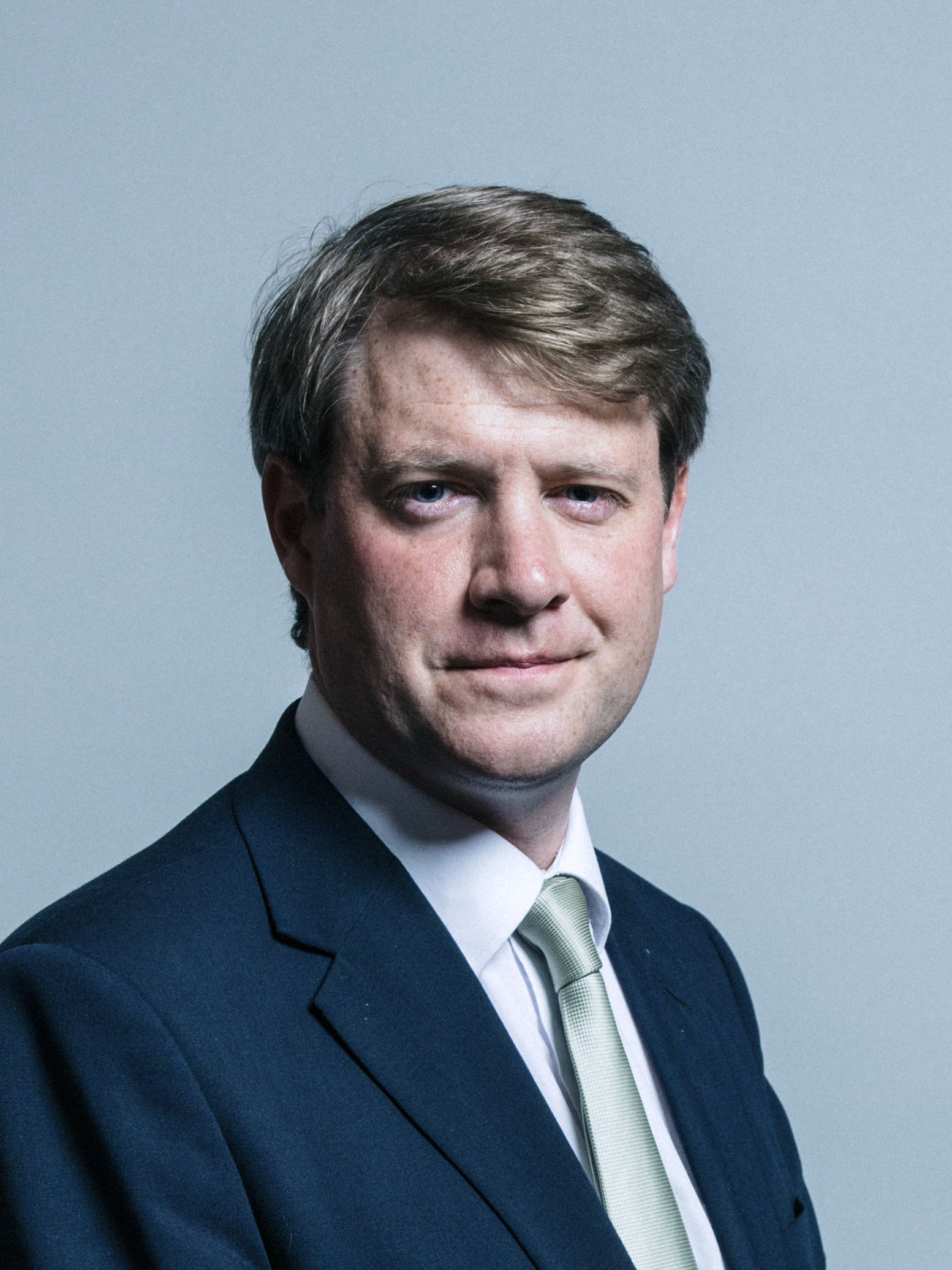
Chris Skidmore

Chris Skidmore was first elected to the constituency of Kingswood in the 2010 general election, gaining the seat from the incumbent Labour MP Roger Berry. As Minister for Energy and Clean Growth, he signed the UK's net zero pledge into law. He has stated his opposition to further oil and gas extraction in the UK, including his refusal to support the government of Liz Truss on the matter in October 2022.

He announced his resignation on 5 January 2024, prior to the second reading of the Offshore Petroleum Licensing Bill which would guarantee annual licensing rounds, having previously announced he would be standing down at the 2024 general election. Skidmore formally resigned as a member of Parliament on 8 January.

The writ of election was moved on 11 January 2024 to be held on 15 February 2024, the same day as another by-election in Wellingborough.

== Candidates ==
The Labour Party selected Damien Egan as their candidate on 9 January. Egan was elected Mayor of Lewisham in 2018, and in July 2023 was selected as parliamentary candidate for Bristol North East, one of the seats that will succeed Kingswood following the 2023 Periodic Review of Westminster constituencies. Egan resigned the mayorality to contest the seat.

The Conservative Party selected Sam Bromiley, the party group's leader on the South Gloucestershire Council, on 14 January. He is a councillor for Parkwall & Warmley.

Though initially stating that they would not stand a candidate over frustrations with the cost of the by-election, Reform UK later selected former MEP for the West Midlands and Referendum Party candidate Rupert Lowe.

The Liberal Democrats selected Bristol City councillor Andrew Brown, who works in the financial sector and is a councillor for the Hengrove and Whitchurch Park ward.

The Green Party candidate was another Bristol City councillor, Lorraine Francis. Francis is a councillor for the Eastville ward and a social worker, who had already been selected as their candidate for Bristol North East at the next general election. She campaigned on protecting the green belt from development.

The UK Independence Party (UKIP) selected Nicholas Wood, its May 2023 candidate in the Surrey County Council by-election for the Walton South & Oatlands division and Elmbridge Council elections for Oatlands and Burwood Park ward.

== Result ==
Bar chart of the election result.

2024 Kingswood by-election
Party	Candidate	Votes	%	±%
Labour	Damien Egan	11,176	44.9	+11.5
Conservative	Sam Bromiley	8,675	34.9	–21.3
Reform	Rupert Lowe	2,578	10.4	New
Green	Lorraine Francis	1,450	5.8	+3.4
Liberal Democrats	Andrew Brown	861	3.5	–3.5
UKIP	Nicholas Wood	129	0.5	New
Majority		2,501	10.0	N/A
Turnout		24,869	37.1	–34.4
Registered electors		67,103		
Labour gain from Conservative		Swing	+16.4	

== Previous result ==
General election 2019: Kingswood
Party	Candidate	Votes	%	±%
Conservative	Chris Skidmore	27,712	56.2	+1.3
Labour	Nicola Bowden-Jones	16,492	33.4	–6.1
Liberal Democrats	Dine Romero	3,421	6.9	+3.3
Green	Joseph Evans	1,200	2.4	+0.4
Animal Welfare	Angelika Cowell	489	1.0	New
Majority		11,220	22.8	+7.4
Turnout		49,314	71.5	+1.3
Registered electors		68,972		
Conservative hold		Swing	+3.7	
