= Hanham Woods Academy =

Location
- Memorial Road; Hanham, Gloucestershire, BS15 3LA; England
- 51.4429°N 2.5203°W

Information
- Former name: Hanham High School
- Type: Academy
- Motto: Dream Big Work Hard Be kind
- Local authority: South Gloucestershire Council
- Trust: Cabot Learning Federation
- Department for Education URN: 141042 Tables
- Ofsted: Reports
- Principal: Kath Cooper
- Gender: Mixed
- Age range: 11–16
- Enrolment: 802 (2019)
- Capacity: 900
- Houses: Conham; Hencliff; Cleeve; Bickley
- Website: www.hanhamwoods.academy

Hanham Woods Academy (formerly Hanham High School) is an 11–16 mixed, secondary school with academy status in Hanham, Gloucestershire, England. It was formerly a community school and adopted its present name after becoming an academy in 2014. It is part of the Cabot Learning Federation.

== Notable alumni ==
Hanham High School

- Stephen Merchant, writer, director, radio presenter, comedian and actor
- Marsha de Cordova, politician, Member of Parliament for Battersea, and Shadow Secretary of State for Women and Equalities
- Larry Godfrey, British Olympic archer
- Andy Uren, Bristol Bears professional rugby player
- Russel Howard, comedian
- Damien Egan, MP for Kingswood
