= Minister of State for Science, Innovation and Investment =

Junior minister in the British Government

United Kingdom Minister of State for Science, Innovation and Investment
- Royal Arms of His Majesty's Government

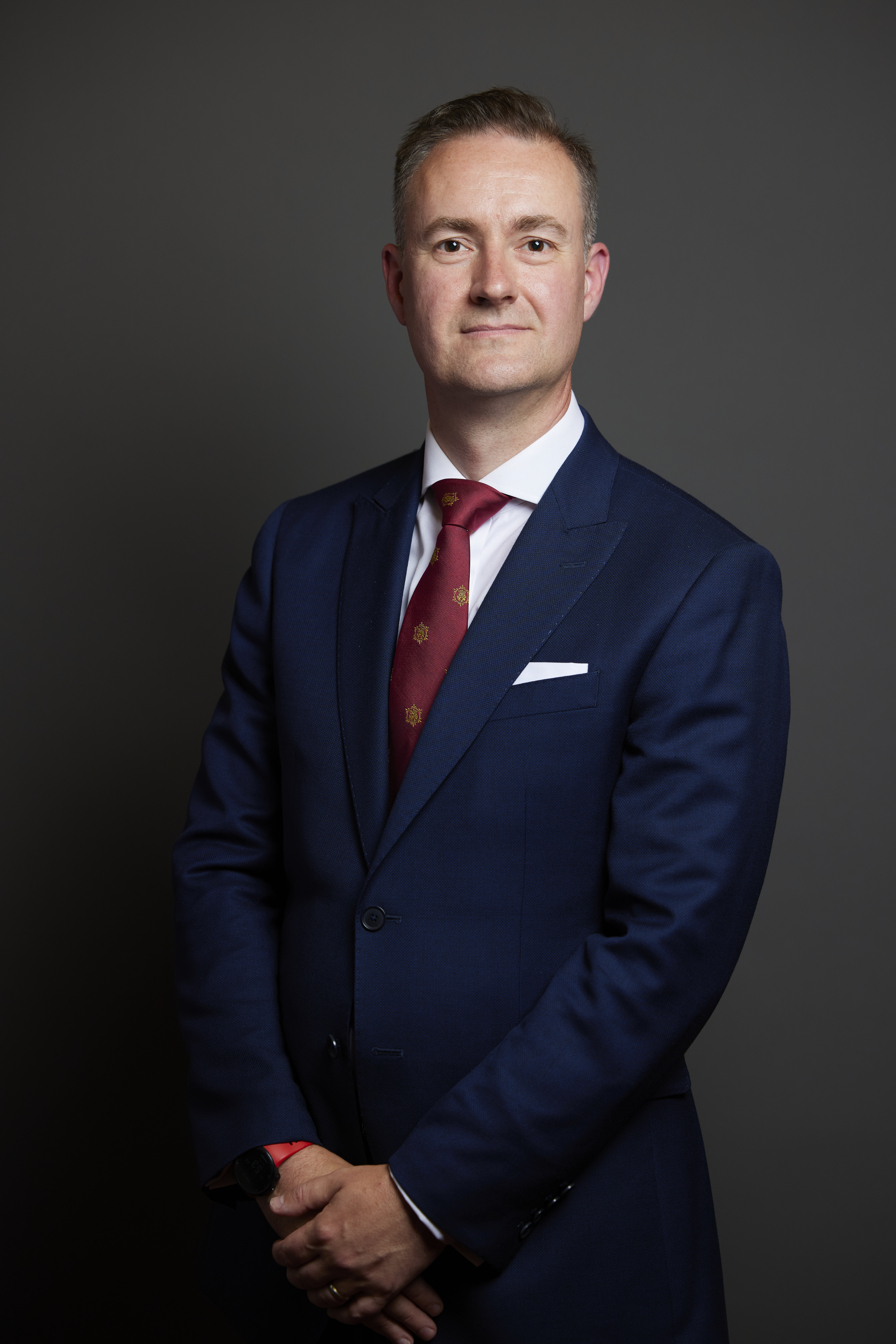
- Incumbent; Chris McDonald since 21 July 2026
- Department for Business, Innovation, Science and Trade; Department of Health and Social Care
- Appointer: The Monarch; on advice of the Prime Minister
- Formation: 20 July 1994: (as Parliamentary Under-Secretary of State for Science and Technology); 22 July 2026: (as Minister of State for Science, Innovation and Investment)
- First holder: Ian Taylor
- Website: www.gov.uk/government/ministers/minister-of-state--223

The minister of state for science, innovation and investment (also known as the science minister) is a mid-level position in the Department for Business, Innovation, Science and Trade and Department of Health and Social Care in the British government. It was created by the Starmer ministry in 2025.

From 2016 to 2023, the minister was based at the Department for Business, Energy and Industrial Strategy, and was based in the Department for Science, Innovation and Technology between 2023 and 2026 and the Department for Energy Security and Net Zero between 2025 and 2026.

== List of ministers ==
| Name | Portrait | Took office | Left office | Political party | Prime Minister |
Parliamentary Under-Secretary of State for Science and Technology
| Ian Taylor MP for Esher | | 20 July 1994 | 2 May 1997 | Conservative | John Major |
Parliamentary Under-Secretary of State for Science and Innovation Role formed out of Minister of State for Science, Energy and Industry
| David Sainsbury, Baron Sainsbury of Turville | | 27 July 1998 | 10 November 2006 | Labour | Tony Blair |
Minister of State for Science and Innovation
| Malcolm Wicks MP for Croydon North | | 10 November 2006 | 28 June 2007 | Labour | Tony Blair |
| Ian Pearson MP for Dudley South | | 28 June 2007 | 5 October 2008 | Labour | Gordon Brown |
| Paul Drayson, Baron Drayson | | 3 October 2008 | 11 May 2010 | Labour | Gordon Brown |
Minister of State for Universities and Science
| David Willetts MP for Havant | | 11 May 2010 | 14 July 2014 | Conservative | David Cameron |
Minister of State for Universities, Science and Cities
| Greg Clark MP for Tunbridge Wells | | 15 July 2014 | 11 May 2015 | Conservative | David Cameron |
Minister of State for Universities, Science, Research and Innovation
| Jo Johnson MP for Orpington | | 11 May 2015 | 9 January 2018 | Conservative | David Cameron |
| Jo Johnson MP for Orpington | | 11 May 2015 | 9 January 2018 | Conservative | Theresa May |
| Sam Gyimah MP for East Surrey | | 9 January 2018 | 30 November 2018 | Conservative | Theresa May |
| Chris Skidmore MP for Kingswood | | 5 December 2018 | 24 July 2019 | Conservative | Theresa May |
| Jo Johnson MP for Orpington | | 24 July 2019 | 5 September 2019 | Conservative | Boris Johnson |
| Chris Skidmore MP for Kingswood | | 10 September 2019 | 13 February 2020 | Conservative | Boris Johnson |
Parliamentary Under-Secretary of State for Science, Research and Innovation
| Amanda Solloway MP for Derby North | | 14 February 2020 | 17 September 2021 | Conservative | Boris Johnson |
| George Freeman MP for Mid Norfolk | | 17 September 2021 | 7 July 2022 | Conservative | Boris Johnson |
Minister of State for Science and Investment Security
| Nus Ghani MP for Wealden | | 7 September 2022 | 26 October 2022 | Conservative | Liz Truss |
Minister of State for Science, Research and Innovation (since 7 February 2023 in the Department for Science, Innovation and Technology)
| George Freeman MP for Mid Norfolk | | 26 October 2022 | 13 November 2023 | Conservative | Rishi Sunak |
| Andrew Griffith MP for Arundel and South Downs | | 13 November 2023 | 5 July 2024 | Conservative | Rishi Sunak |
| Patrick Vallance, Baron Vallance of Balham | | 5 July 2024 | 6 September 2025 | Labour | Keir Starmer |
Minister of State for Science, Innovation, Research and Nuclear (in the Department for Science, Innovation and Technology and the Department for Energy Security and Net Zero)
| Patrick Vallance, Baron Vallance of Balham | | 6 September 2025 | 20 July 2026 | Labour | Keir Starmer |
Minister of State for Science, Innovation and Investment (In the Department for Business, Innovation, Science and Trade and Department of Health and Social Care)
| Chris McDonald MP for Stockton North | | 21 July 2026 | Incumbent | Labour | Andy Burnham |

== See also ==
- Department for Science, Innovation and Technology
- Department for Energy Security and Net Zero
- Ministry of Science
