= Damien Egan =

British Labour politician (born 1983)

Damien Egan MP
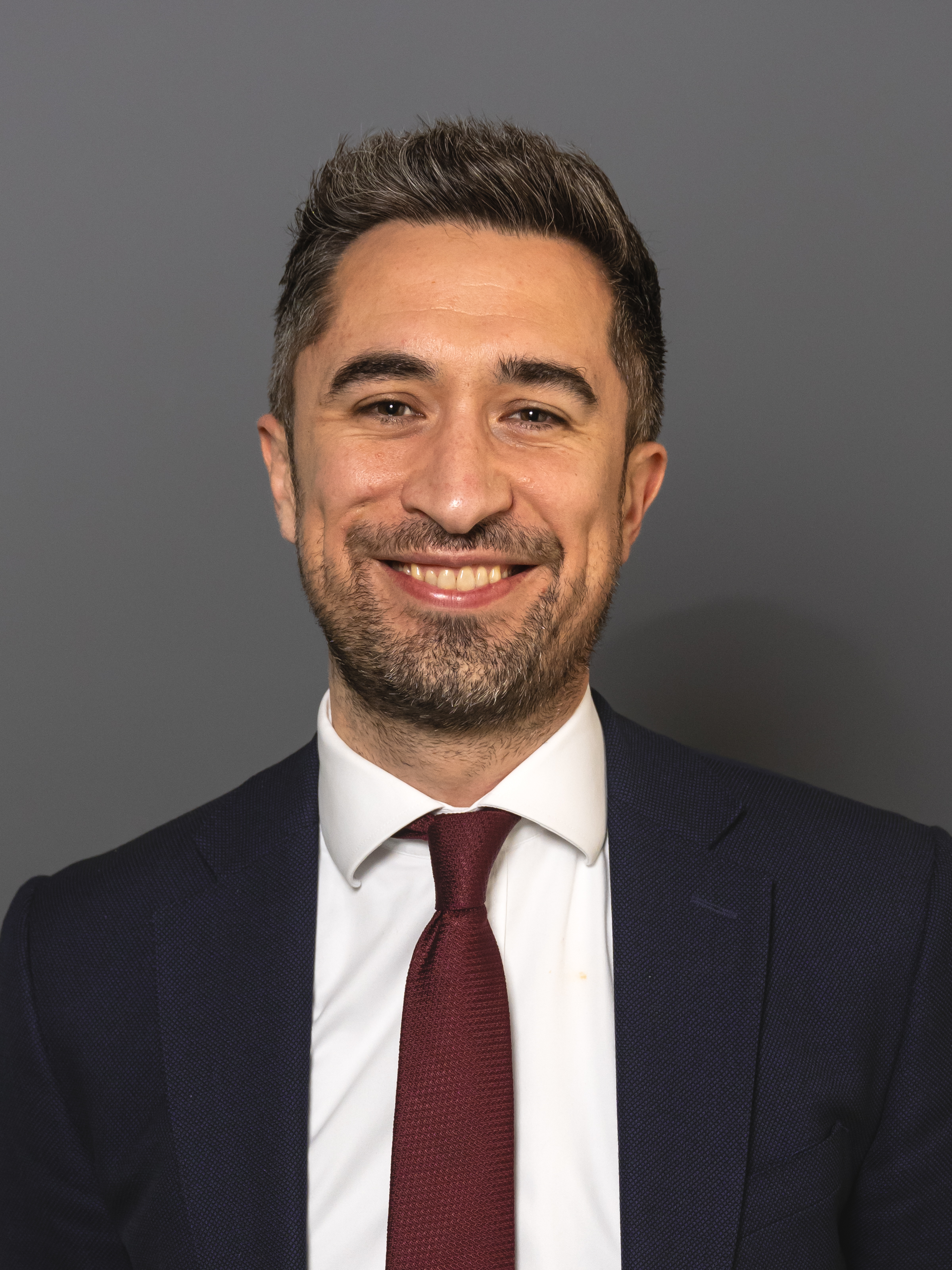
- Official portrait, 2024

Member of Parliament for Bristol North East Kingswood (2024)
- Incumbent
- Assumed office 15 February 2024
- Preceded by: Chris Skidmore
- Majority: 11,167 (26.6%)

Mayor of Lewisham
- In office 7 May 2018 – 9 January 2024
- Preceded by: Steve Bullock
- Succeeded by: Brenda Dacres

Member of Lewisham London Borough Council for Lewisham Central
- In office 6 May 2010 – 3 May 2018

Personal details
- Born: Damien James Egan; 8 July 1982 (age 44) Cork, County Cork, Ireland
- Party: Labour
- Spouse: Yossi Felberbaum
- Education: Hanham High School; St Mary's University College, Twickenham (BA)
- Website: https://www.damienegan.com

Damien James Egan (born 8 July 1982) is a British Labour politician serving as the Member of Parliament (MP) for Bristol North East, previously Kingswood, since 2024. He was previously the Mayor of Lewisham in Greater London from 2018 to 2024.

== Early life and education ==
Damien James Egan was born on 8 July 1983 in Cork, Ireland, and grew up in northeast Bristol, England. During his childhood, his family became homeless and lived in temporary accommodation.

Egan attended Our Lady of Lourdes Primary School and Hanham High School. He studied at St Mary's University College in Twickenham before moving to Lewisham after graduating.

== Political career before Parliament ==
From 2003 to 2007, Egan was a parish councillor on Downend and Bromley Heath Parish Council in Bristol before he moved to London.

Elected as a councillor for Lewisham Central in 2010, Egan was appointed Lewisham London Borough Council's cabinet member for housing in 2014.

In 2017, Egan was selected as the Labour Party's candidate for the directly elected mayoral elections in Lewisham in May 2018. He was elected Mayor of Lewisham with 54 per cent of the vote. In the 2022 mayoral elections, Egan was re-elected with an increased majority and 58 per cent of the vote.

Egan is a trustee of the Jewish Museum London.

=== Mayor of Lewisham ===
Egan was Mayor of Lewisham from 7 May 2018 to 9 January 2024. His priorities included schools, council homes, parks, climate action and making Lewisham the first Borough of Sanctuary in May 2021.

As mayor, Egan worked with the London Community Land Trust and Citizens UK to develop a community land trust providing affordable homes for Lewisham residents. Egan also supported other community land trust projects across Lewisham including London's largest self-build affordable housing project.

Egan faced accusations of forcing out Lewisham Council CEO Ian Thomas (then the only black chief executive of a local council) in November 2018, who had only been in post for seven months. Protests about his departure led to police being called to a council meeting.

== Parliamentary career ==
At the 2005 general election, Egan stood as the Labour candidate for Weston-super-Mare, finishing third with 18.7 per cent of the vote behind the Conservative candidate John Penrose and the Liberal Democrat candidate Brian Cotter.

At the 2010 general election, Egan stood as the Labour candidate for Beckenham, where he finished third with 14.5 per cent of the vote behind the Conservatives' Bob Stewart and the Liberal Democrats.

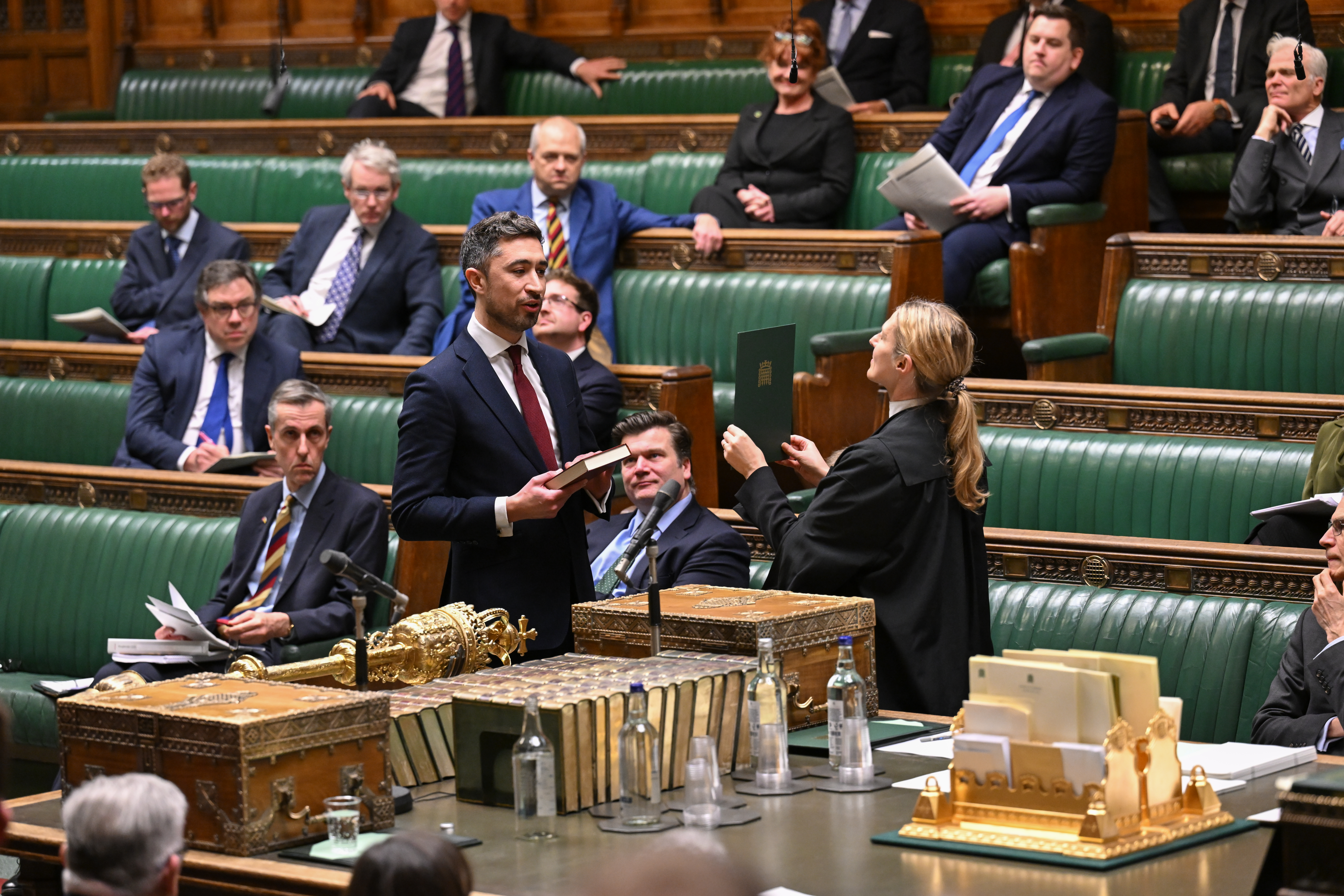
Egan being sworn in to the House of Commons on 19 February 2024

In July 2023, Egan was selected as Labour's prospective parliamentary candidate for Bristol North East. He defeated Bristol mayor Marvin Rees to win the candidacy for the new seat, which was established due to boundary changes at the 2024 general election.

On 15 February 2024, he became MP for Kingswood in South Gloucestershire at the Kingswood by-election, following the resignation of the Conservative MP Chris Skidmore. Egan was elected with 44.9% of the vote and a majority of 2,501.

Due to the 2023 Periodic Review of Westminster constituencies, Egan's constituency of Kingswood was abolished, and replaced with Bristol North East. At the 2024 general election, Egan was elected to Parliament as MP for Bristol North East with a vote share of 45.3% and a majority of 11,167.

In March 2024 Egan undertook a visit to Israel which was paid for by the Labour Friends of Israel (LFI).

Egan was appointed as an honorary vice-chair of Labour Friends of Israel (LFI) in November 2024. He is also the co-chair of the UK Parliament All-Party Parliamentary Group (APPG) on UK-Israel. One of the stated aims of the Israel APPG is to "to make the case for Israel and for the UK's bilateral relationship with the Jewish state".

In February 2025 Egan visited the USA to attend the 2025 AIPAC Congressional Summit, which was paid for by the Labour Friends of Israel (LFI).

In January 2026, Egan came to the attention of the UK national media because of the cancellation of a school visit to the Bristol Brunel Academy in his constituency in September 2025. This followed a statement by Communities Secretary, Steve Reed, describing the refusal to permit Egan to enter the school as an "absolute outrage", adding, "you cannot have people with those kinds of attitudes teaching our children. You just can't have it." Subsequent analyses of the reporting, however, have criticised the media reporting of the cancellation as it being the result of Egan's Jewish identity rather than being due to his support for Israel during the ongoing Gaza genocide. Ofsted carried out a snap inspection of the school and Inspectors found "no evidence of partisan political views", and that the school covered different cultures, religious beliefs and geographical locations appropriately. Inspectors found no evidence that the visit was postponed due to co-ordinated pressure from staff and external groups and Egan's visit was rearranged.

== Personal life ==
Egan is married to Israeli-born Yossi Felberbaum. Though raised a Catholic, Egan converted to Judaism, his husband's faith, at Bromley Reform Synagogue in 2018, two years after meeting Felberbaum.

Parliament of the United Kingdom
Preceded by Chris Skidmore	Member of Parliament for Kingswood; 2024–2024	Constituency abolished
New constituency	Member of Parliament for Bristol North East; 2024–present	Incumbent
