= Richard Cottrell =

Richard Cottrell may refer to:

- Richard Cottrell (theatre director)
- Richard Cottrell (politician)
