= Bristol (European Parliament constituency) =

Former European Parliament constituency

- European Parliament constituency
- Boundary within South West England (1979-1984)
- Member state: United Kingdom
- Created: 1979
- Dissolved: 1999
- MEPs: 1

Bristol was a European Parliament constituency centred on Bristol in England, but covering much of Avon. Until 1984, it included parts of southern Gloucestershire and northwestern Wiltshire.

Prior to its uniform adoption of proportional representation in 1999, the United Kingdom used first-past-the-post for the European elections in England, Scotland and Wales. The European Parliament constituencies used under that system were smaller than the later regional constituencies and only had one Member of the European Parliament each.

When it was created in England in 1979, it consisted of the Westminster Parliament constituencies of Bristol North East, Bristol North West, Bristol South, Bristol South East, Bristol West, Chippenham, Kingswood, and South Gloucestershire. In 1984, it was redrawn to consist of Bath, Bristol East, Bristol North West, Bristol South, Bristol West, Kingswood, Northavon, and Wansdyke. In 1994, it consisted of Bristol East, Bristol North West, Bristol South, Bristol West, Kingswood, Northavon, and Woodspring.

The seat became part of the much larger South West England constituency in 1999.

Boundary within South West England (1984-1994)

Boundary within South West England (1994-1999)

== Members of the European Parliament ==
Election	Member	Party
1979	Richard Cottrell	Conservative
1989	Ian White	Labour

== Results ==
European Parliament election, 1979: Bristol
Party	Candidate	Votes	%	±%
Conservative	Richard Cottrell	100,160	54.2	
Labour	Doug Naysmith	59,443	32.1	
Liberal	James P. Heppell	25,308	13.7	
Majority		40,717	22.1	
Turnout		184,911	35.1	
Conservative win (new seat)				

European Parliament election, 1984: Bristol
Party	Candidate	Votes	%	±%
Conservative	Richard Cottrell	94,652	46.1	−8.2
Labour	Roger Berry	77,008	37.5	+5.4
SDP	Peter J. Farley	33,698	16.4	+2.7
Majority		17,644	8.6	−13.5
Turnout		205,438	36.0	+0.9
Conservative hold		Swing		

European Parliament election, 1989: Bristol
Party	Candidate	Votes	%	±%
Labour	Ian White	87,753	39.5	+2.0
Conservative	Richard Cottrell	77,771	35.0	−11.1
Green	Derek Wall	39,436	17.7	New
SLD	Charles Boney	16,309	7.3	−9.1
Wessex Regionalists	Gwendoline McEwen	1,017	0.5	New
Majority		9,982	4.5	−4.1
Turnout		222,286	39.6	+3.6
Labour gain from Conservative		Swing		

European Parliament election, 1994: Bristol
Party	Candidate	Votes	%	±%
Labour	Ian White	90,790	44.1	+4.6
Conservative	Earl of Stockton	60,835	29.6	−5.4
Liberal Democrats	Jim A. W. Barnard	40,394	19.6	+12.3
Green	John H. Boxall	7,163	3.5	−14.2
UKIP	Thomas H. Whittingham	5,798	2.8	New
Natural Law	Thomas Dyball	876	0.4	New
Majority		29,955	14.5	+10.0
Turnout		205,856	40.9	+1.3
Labour hold		Swing		
