= Richard Cottrell (politician) =

English politician (1943–2024)

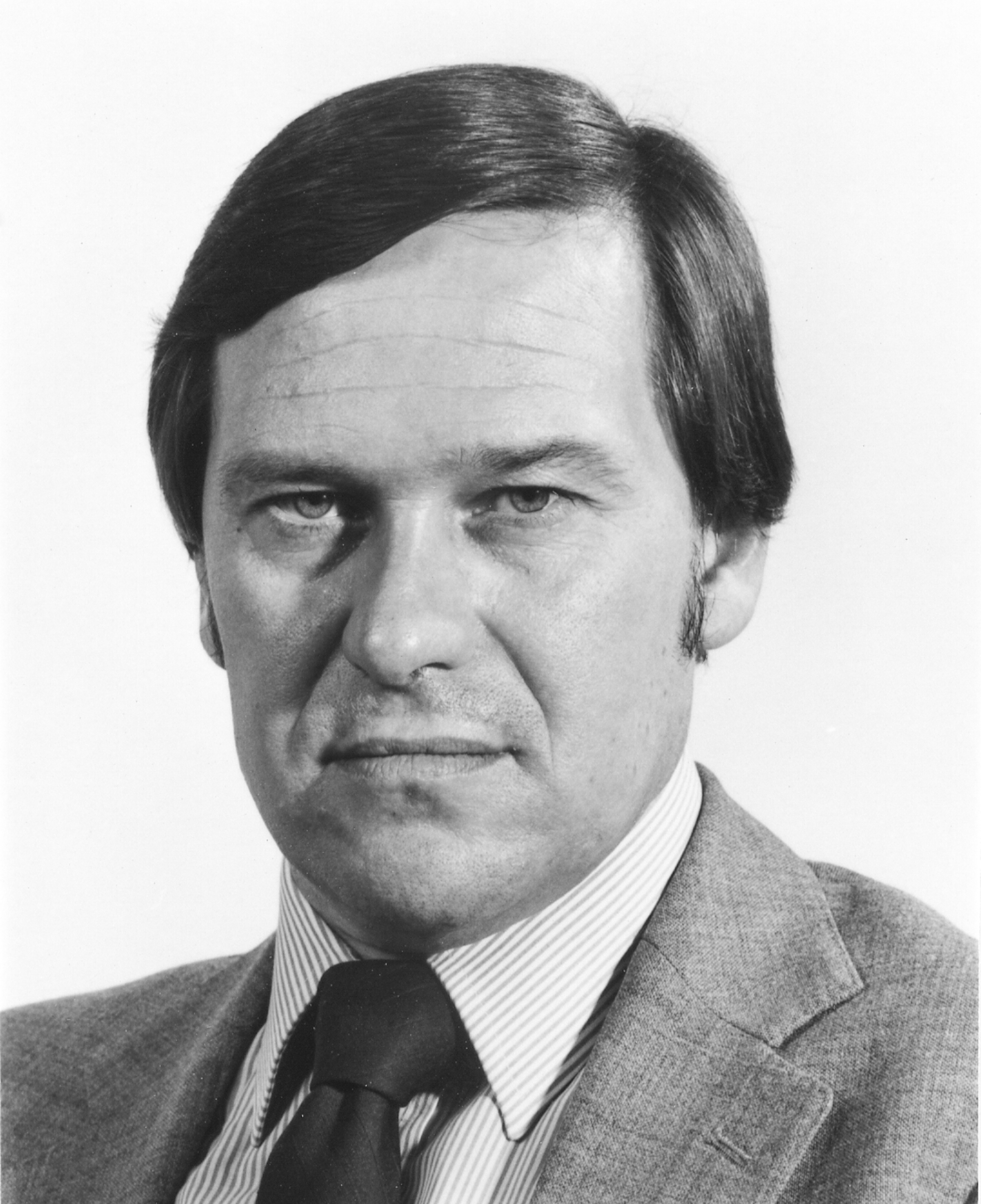
- MEP portrait of Cottrell

Member of the European Parliament for Bristol
- In office 17 July 1979 – 24 July 1989
- Preceded by: constituency established
- Succeeded by: Ian White

Personal details
- Born: 11 July 1943 Wellington, Somerset, England
- Died: 18 July 2024 (aged 81) near Treviso, Italy
- Party: Conservative

Richard John Cottrell (11 July 1943 – 18 July 2024) was an English politician and author who was a Member of the European Parliament for the British constituency of Bristol from 1979 until 1989.

== Biography ==
Richard Cottrell was born on 11 July 1943 in Wellington, Somerset. He was educated at Court Fields School in Wellington, and at the age of 15 became a cub journalist for the Wellington Weekly News. Over the next ten years he worked for various newspapers, including the Brighton Evening Argus, Lincolnshire Standard and Bristol Evening Post, before joining Television Wales and the West (subsequently HTV) in 1967.

In 1979, he was elected to the European Parliament for the Conservative Party, and started his service on 17 July 1979. During his first term, he joined the Committee on Transport on 20 July of the same year and the Committee on Youth, Culture, Education, Information and Sport on 11 July 1980, serving on both until the Parliament adjourned on 23 July 1984.

Cottrell was re-elected in 1984, again for the Conservative Party, and served until 24 July 1989. He served as a member of the committees for the Rules of Procedure, the Verification of Credencials [sic] and Immunities; the Rules of Procedure and Petitions; and the Environment, Public Health and Consumer Protection; and also participated in diplomatic relations with Canada and the People's Republic of China.

In 1989, he lost re-election to Labour Party candidate Ian White. He then served as the chairman of Rail Central Europe and in retirement wrote two books, Gladio: NATO’s Dagger at the Heart of Europe (2012) and Doctor Who?: The Atomic Bomber Beeching and his War on the Railways (2013).

Cottrell died near Treviso, Italy on 18 July 2024, at the age of 81.

== Bibliography ==
- The Sacred Cow: Folly of Europe's Food Mountains, 1987 ISBN 0246132248
- Blood on their Hands: Killing of Ann Chapman, 1988 ISBN 0586066799
- Gladio: NATO’s Dagger at the Heart of Europe, 2012 ISBN 1615776885
- Doctor Who? The Atomic Bomber Beeching and his War on the Railways., 2013 ASIN B00CJJJD6C
