= Robert Hayward, Baron Hayward =

British politician

The Right Honourable The Lord Hayward OBE
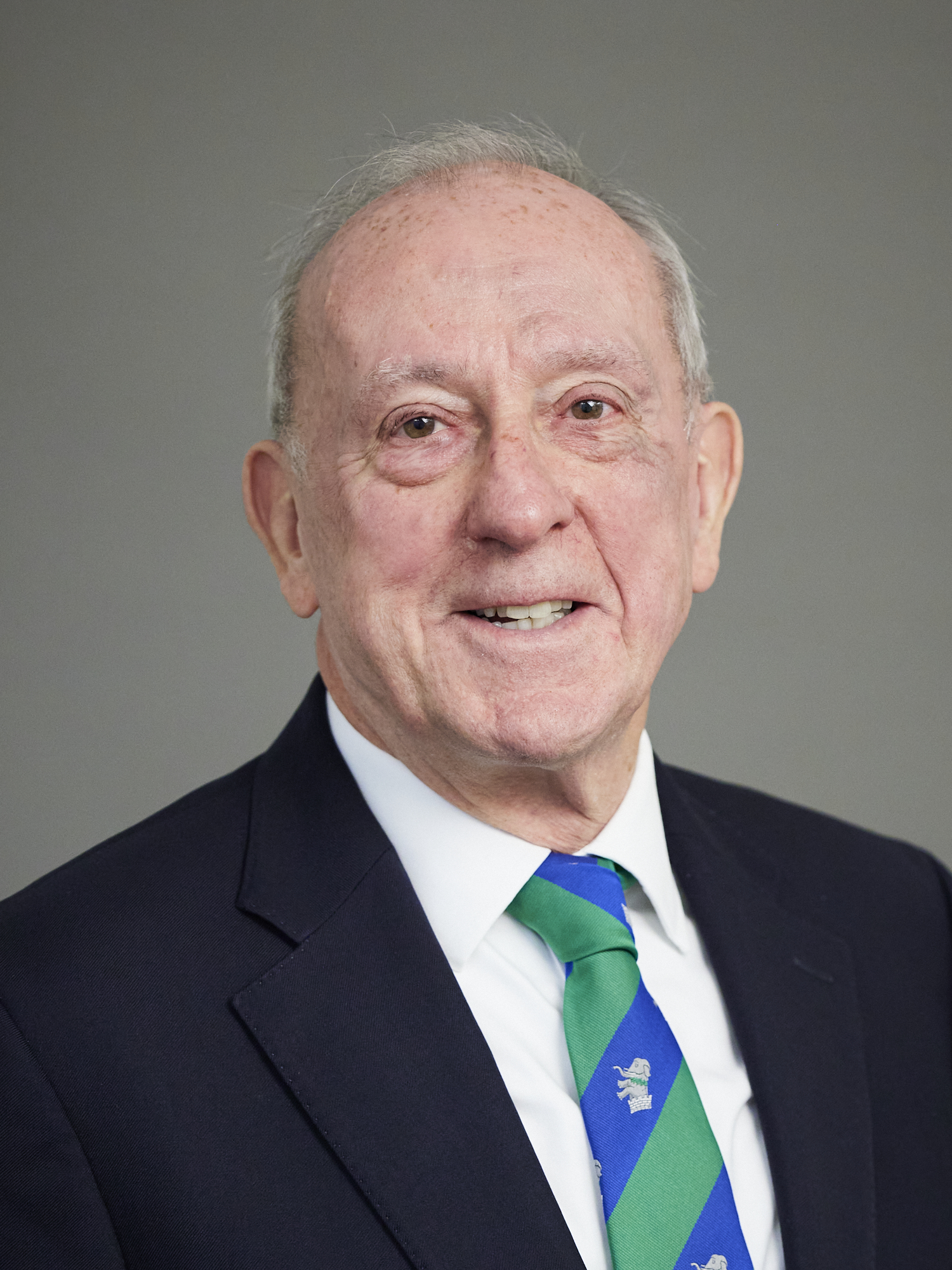
- Official portrait, 2023

Member of the House of Lords
- Lord Temporal
- Life peerage 28 September 2015

Member of Parliament for Kingswood
- In office 9 June 1983 – 16 March 1992
- Preceded by: Jack Aspinwall
- Succeeded by: Roger Berry

Personal details
- Born: 11 March 1949 (age 77)
- Party: Conservative
- Education: University of Rhodesia

Robert Antony Hayward, Baron Hayward, OBE (born 11 March 1949) is a British Conservative Party politician and media commentator.

== Early life ==
Hayward was educated at Abingdon School and Maidenhead Grammar School, where he was head boy. He won a scholarship to study economics (honours) at the University of Rhodesia. He served as national vice-chairman of the Young Conservatives from 1976 to 1977 and was a councillor on Coventry City Council from 1976 to 1978.

== Parliamentary career ==
Hayward first stood for Parliament, unsuccessfully, at Carmarthen, in October 1974, being beaten by the leader of Plaid Cymru, Gwynfor Evans.

He was the Member of Parliament (MP) for Kingswood from 1983 to 1992. In January 1992 he "talked out" the second reading of the Civil Rights (Disabled Persons) Bill, and had to apologise for misleading the House. He lost his seat in the 1992 general election to Labour's Roger Berry.

In 1993, Hayward was the unsuccessful Conservative candidate at the Christchurch by-election, losing the safe seat by a swing of over 35% to the Liberal Democrat candidate. During the campaign he was targeted by disability rights activists from the Disabled People's Direct Action Network for previously blocking legislation that would have improved disabled people's rights.

During his time in the House of Commons, he served on the Energy Select Committee (1984–85), the Conservative Party's Aviation Committee (1984–92) and as PPS at the Department for Trade & Industry, including to Michael Howard as the then minister for corporate and consumer affairs. Hayward was also PPS to Paul Channon, the secretary of state for transport, between 1987 and 1989, a period that saw the Lockerbie bombing, Clapham and Kings Cross rail disasters and the Kegworth air crash.

In 1989, Hayward successfully predicted the number of MPs not supporting Margaret Thatcher in the leadership election. In 1990, Hayward conducted similar analysis for the first leadership ballot and the implications of the second.

Prior to the 1992 general election, Hayward correctly forecast a Conservative victory on the basis of an analysis of the opinion polls and election results in 1991 and submitted in a paper written for the party leadership, including prime minister, John Major. Although the term was not coined by Hayward, his paper gave rise to the phrase 'shy Tory'. The paper (and forecast) was referred to in The Sunday Times on 12 April 1992.

=== Rugby referee ===
Throughout his time as an MP, Hayward continued to referee rugby union, having qualified in 1980. Following his election defeat in 1992, he was promoted to national level and officiated at division 3 and 4 and county championship matches. Hayward refereed the first inter-parliamentary rugby game – between Britain and France in 1991.

=== Gulf War hostages ===
Hayward was appointed an Officer of the Order of the British Empire (OBE) for his services to friends and families of hostages prior to the Gulf War in 1991 Iraq War, when he established and ran, with others, the Gulf Support Group for civilians who were held after the invasion of Kuwait by Iraq. This service ran initially from Hayward's home, then from offices in London.

== After Parliament ==
Following his Commons career, in 1994 he became chief executive of the British Soft Drinks Association. He then moved to become chief executive of the British Beer and Pub Association in 1999, a post he held until 2009.

Hayward has been a prominent spokesman on gay and lesbian issues since coming out after leaving parliament, and in 1996 was one of the founding members and first chairman of the Kings Cross Steelers who successfully competed as the first gay rugby union team in the world. As of 2015, he is currently a vice-president of the club. Hayward was recipient of national Rugby Writers Award on 13 January 2020 for 'services to rugby'.

Hayward stepped down as CEO of the Beer and Pub Association to concentrate on his career as a psephologist and political analyst. He was an advisor to the then-chairman of the Conservative Party Eric Pickles and was widely credited with identifying 'motorway man' as a key factor in the 2010 general election.

During 2009/10 he had responsibility for preparing policy for the Conservative Party to reduce the size of the House of Commons. He subsequently worked at Conservative Campaign Headquarters on the Conservative Party's proposals for the abortive 2011–13 boundary review.

Hayward was deputy chairman of Central YMCA from 2011 until 2017, and treasurer of Dignity in Dying from 2012 to 2015. From 2012 to 2014, a non-executive director of Portcullis Public Affairs. In 2014 Hayward was presenter of the Business Breakfast Show on Colourful Radio.

It was announced on 15 May 2012 that Robert Hayward would be chairing the government's Public Sector Equality Duty review. This review was completed in September 2013.

In the 2014, 2018 and 2022 elections in the London Borough of Southwark, Hayward was a candidate in Camberwell Green ward.

== Return to Parliament ==
On 27 August 2015 it was announced in the Dissolution Honours list that Hayward would be awarded a life peerage. He was created Baron Hayward, of Cumnor in the County of Oxfordshire, on 28 September 2015.

In June 2016, Hayward sponsored the Assisted Dying Bill 2016–17 in the House of Lords. In 2017, he revealed that he has been living with multiple sclerosis.

Hayward is a media commentator on elections and opinion polls, as well as an election night analyst for LBC in 2017 and TalkRadio in 2019.

== See also ==
- List of Old Abingdonians

== Sources ==
- The Times Guide to the House of Commons, Times Newspapers Ltd, 1983
- The Times Guide to the House of Commons, Times Newspapers Ltd, 1992
- Almamac of British Politics (1999)

Parliament of the United Kingdom
Preceded by Jack Aspinwall	Member of Parliament for Kingswood; 1983–1992	Succeeded by Roger Berry
Orders of precedence in the United Kingdom
Preceded by The Lord Blunkett	Gentlemen; Baron Hayward	Followed by The Lord Young of Cookham
