= Steve Bullock (British politician) =

British politician (born 1953)

Sir Steve Bullock DL
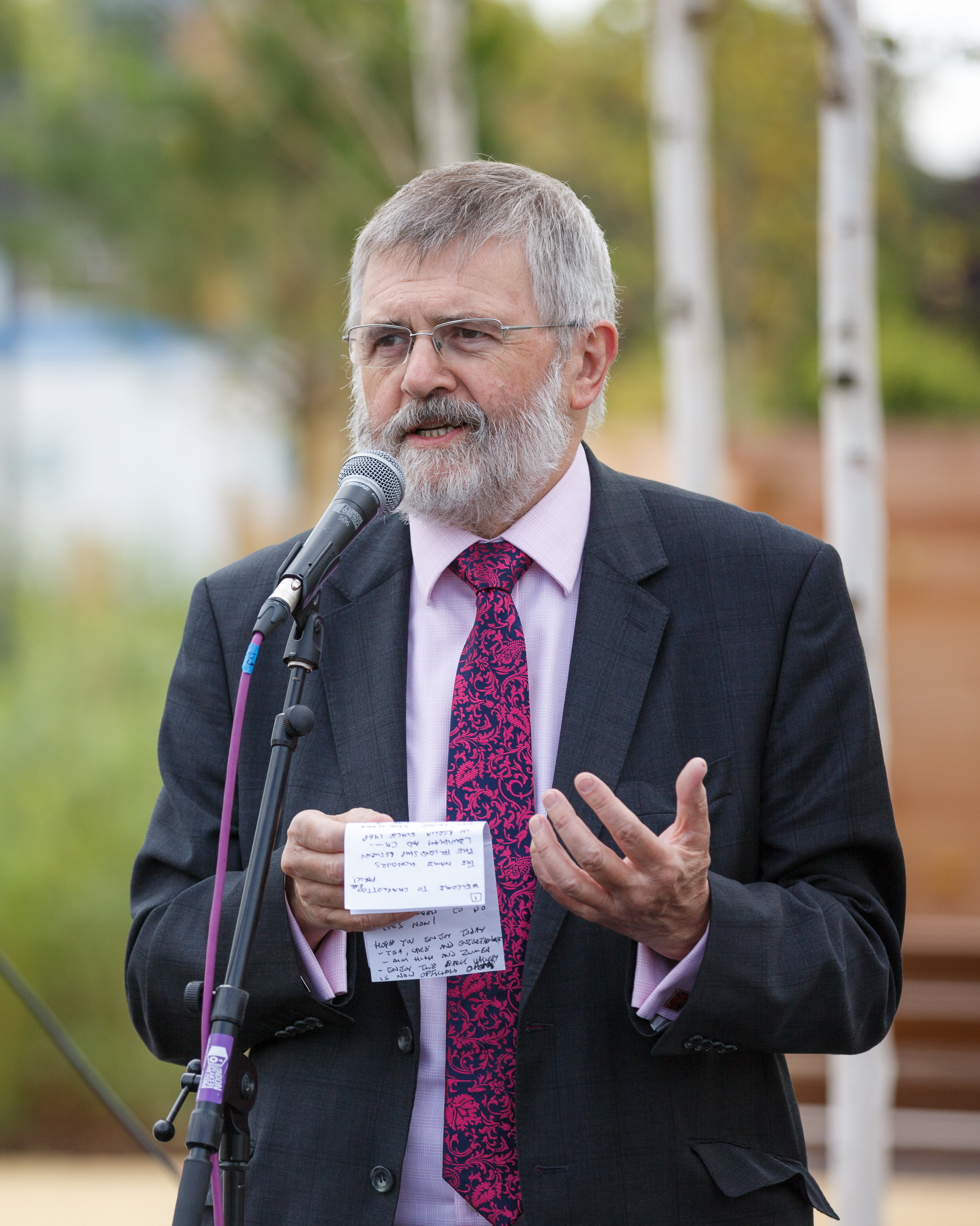

1st Mayor of Lewisham
- In office 6 May 2002 – 6 May 2018
- Preceded by: Office created
- Succeeded by: Damien Egan

Personal details
- Born: 1953 (age 72–73) Redcar, North Riding of Yorkshire, England
- Party: Labour

Sir Steve Bullock DL (born 1953) is a British politician who served as the first directly elected mayor of the London Borough of Lewisham from 2002 to 2018.

== Early life ==
Born in Redcar, North Riding of Yorkshire, Bullock began his career as a van driver for Saltburn and Marske-by-the-Sea Urban District Council in 1972. He later worked as a policy adviser for Ken Livingstone at the Greater London Council, as Chief Executive of Greenwich Community Health Council and as Head of the Labour Group Office at the Local Government Association. Having served on the independent Commission for Local Democracy, Bullock was a founder member of the New Local Government Network.

== Political career ==
Elected to the London Borough of Lewisham council in 1982, Bullock then went on to serve as Chair of Finance, Chair of Leisure, Deputy Leader, and was Leader of the Council 1988-1993, prior to standing down from the council in 1998. Following this, he served as Chair of University Hospital Lewisham NHS Trust. Bullock's partner is Kris Hibbert, a former fellow councillor.

In 2001, Bullock was elected back to Lewisham council in a by-election before seeking the Labour nomination for the new post of elected mayor, having publicly supported the proposal (as chair of the hospital trust) in the October referendum campaign. He was subsequently elected in the first mayoral election.

Bullock was re-elected in the May 2006 Lewisham mayoral poll and became the Labour vice-chair of the Association of London Government later that year. He also served as Deputy Leader of the Local Government Association Labour Group. Bullock was re-elected as mayor of Lewisham in the May 2010 election and again in 2014. He was the London Council's executive lead for housing and vice chair of Homes for London.

== New Bermondsey ==
Bullock became involved in a controversy in January 2017 regarding his links to former colleagues (Dave Sullivan and others) who set up a company called Renewal, which bought land near Millwall's football stadium, The New Den. In 2016 the company asked Lewisham for a CPO (Compulsory Purchase Order) for Lewisham to buy up land leased by the football club. There was a suggestion that the club would have to leave the area. The plan was eventually scrapped, and Lord Dyson, a former Master of the Rolls, convened an Enquiry to look into the matter.

Lord Dyson's report in late 2017 ruled that there had been "no impropriety, lack of due diligence, or breach of a code of practice on the part of any Council officer or member".

== Honours ==
Bullock was appointed a Knight Bachelor in the 2007 Birthday Honours for services to local government.

Following his retirement as mayor, he was commissioned by the Lord-Lieutenant of Greater London, Kenneth Olisa to serve as the Representative Deputy Lieutenant for Lewisham.

| Preceded by New creation | Mayor of Lewisham; 2002–2018 | Succeeded by Damien Egan |
