= Joani Reid =

British politician

Joani Reid MP
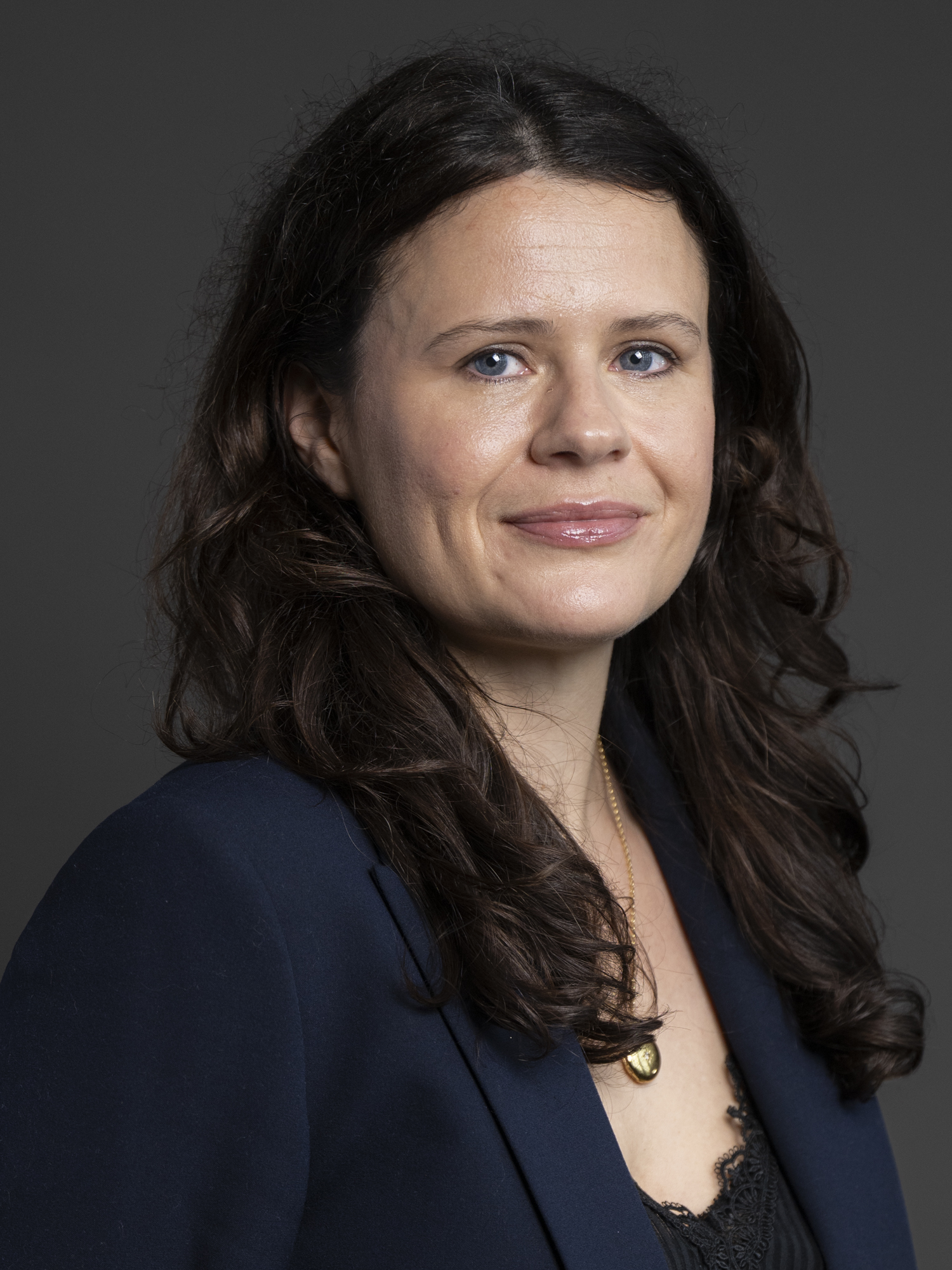
- Official portrait, 2024

Member of Parliament for East Kilbride and Strathaven
- Incumbent
- Assumed office 4 July 2024
- Preceded by: Lisa Cameron
- Majority: 9,057 (19.4%)

Member of Lewisham London Borough Council for Lewisham Central
- In office 22 May 2014 – 5 May 2022

Personal details
- Born: 1985 or 1986 (age 39–40) Glasgow, Scotland
- Party: Labour
- Other political affiliations: Independent (2026)
- Spouse: David Taylor
- Children: 2
- Education: University of Glasgow (MA)

Joani Reid (born 1985/1986) is a British politician who has served as the Member of Parliament (MP) for East Kilbride and Strathaven for Scottish Labour since 2024.

== Early life ==
Reid was born in 1985 or 1986 in Glasgow, Scotland, where she was also raised. Reid is a granddaughter of the Scottish trade unionist Jimmy Reid. She studied politics and philosophy at the University of Glasgow, then went to London for a masters' degree in public policy and management. She worked as a policy manager at the Academy of Medical Royal Colleges.

== Political career ==
=== Local government ===
Reid was a councillor for the Lewisham Central ward in Lewisham for eight years from 2014 and served as Cabinet Member for Safer Communities.

=== House of Commons ===
Reid was selected as the Labour candidate for East Kilbride and Strathaven in February 2023 and elected to the House of Commons at the 2024 general election. Reid has served as a member of the Home Affairs Select Committee since October 2024. She is Chair of the All-Party Parliamentary Group Against Antisemitism.

In 2025, Reid wrote for both the Daily Record to criticise Nicola Sturgeon's support for transgender rights and in LabourList to celebrate the Supreme Court decision on the Equality Act's definitions of man and woman. In October 2025, she faced criticism from Scottish National Party politicians and local councillors after stating that their party had "turned Glasgow into a sanctuary for asylum seekers through their own virtue-signalling policies". Reid was also a member of the Armed Forces Parliamentary Scheme (AFPS), but resigned after a visit to HMNB Clyde in January 2025.

==== Husband's arrest in March 2026 ====
Reid's husband, David Taylor, was arrested in March 2026 on suspicion of spying for China. In response to the arrest, Reid denied having any connection with her husband's business activities or with China. Reid resigned the Labour Party whip on 5 March 2026. However, on 30 July, she had her whip restored.

It was later announced that she had received £2,400 from Taylor's firm just three weeks before his arrest. On 1 April 2026, the Financial Times reported that an internal investigation by the Royal Navy revealed Reid had exchanged flirtatious messages with the captain of a nuclear armed submarine, and it was alleged that she had been intoxicated and behaved inappropriately during a visit to HMNB Clyde in January 2025.

== Personal life ==
Reid is married to David Taylor, a former special adviser to the Wales Office, and has two children. Taylor was appointed head of programmes at the Asia House think tank in September 2024. In 2016, he was the Labour candidate for North Wales Police and Crime Commissioner.
