= Ian White (politician) =

British Labour Party politician (1945–2021)

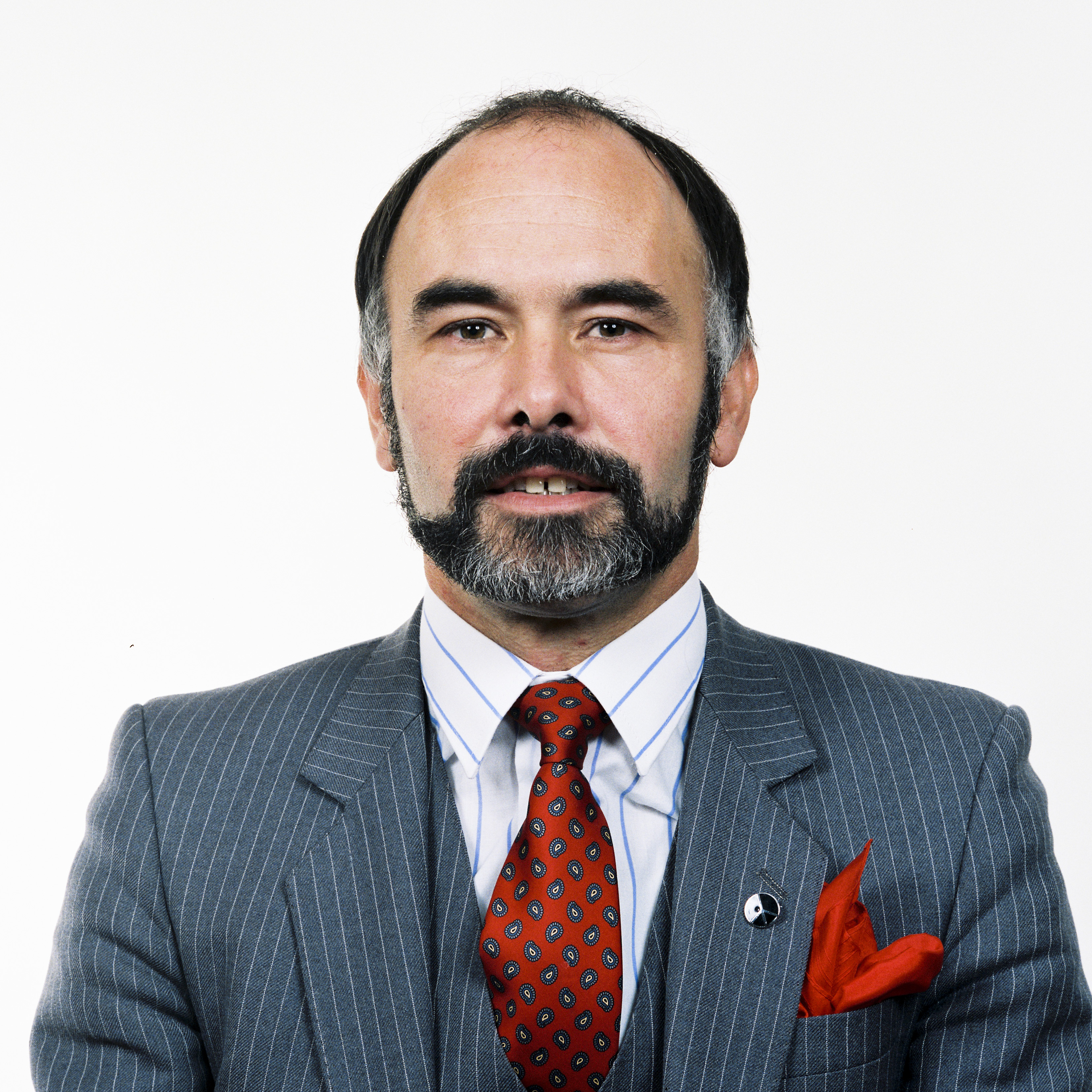
- Official MEP portrait

Member of the European Parliament for Bristol
- In office 24 July 1989 – 15 July 1999
- Preceded by: Ian White
- Succeeded by: constituency abolished

Personal details
- Born: 8 April 1945 Bristol, England
- Died: 27 June 2021 (aged 76)
- Party: Labour

Ian White (8 April 1945 – 27 June 2021) was a British Labour Party politician. He was a Member of the European Parliament (MEP) for Bristol from 1989 to 1999.

== Biography ==
White was born in South Bristol in April 1945, and trained as a solicitor.

Prior to becoming an MEP he stood for the UK Parliament in the Wansdyke constituency.

During his legislative terms in the European Parliament Ian White was a member of the Political Affairs Committee and the Committee on the Environmental, Public Health and Consumer Protection.

He was Vice Chair of both the Delegation for relations with Switzerland and South Africa. He was also a member of the Delegation for relations with the Maghreb Countries and the Delegation to the EC-Austria Joint Parliamentary Committee.

In the 1999 European Parliament election, White's Bristol seat was incorporated into a 7-member South West England seat, using a list system, in which White was placed second to Glyn Ford on the Labour list. White narrowly failed to get re-elected and Ford was the only Labour member returned.

After leaving the European Parliament in 1999 Ian White returned to his family legal practice in South Gloucestershire.
