= Lewisham Central =

Electoral ward in England

Coordinates: 51.459885°N 0.011542°W

- Electoral ward for the Lewisham London Borough Council
- Lewisham Central ward boundaries since 2022
- Borough: Lewisham
- County: Greater London
- Population: 8,199 (2021) (Note: 2021 Census data reported for 2022 ward boundaries)
- Electorate: 5,247 (2022)
- Area: 0.6509 square kilometres (0.2513 sq mi)

Current electoral ward
- Created: 2002
- Councillors: 2002–2022: 3; 2022–present:2
- GSS code: E05000448 (2002–2022); E05013727 (2022–present)

Lewisham Central is an electoral ward in the London Borough of Lewisham. The ward was created for the 2002 election. The boundaries of the ward were significantly redrawn in 2022 and the number of councillors elected to Lewisham London Borough Council reduced from three to two.

== Lewisham council elections since 2022 ==
There was a revision of ward boundaries in Lewisham in 2022. The ward was significantly reduced in size with territory removed from the east and the south.

=== 2022 election ===
The election took place on 5 May 2022.

2022 Lewisham London Borough Council election: Lewisham Central
Party	Candidate	Votes	%	±%
Labour	Edison Huynh	876	62.5	
Labour	Aliya Sheikh	791	56.4	
Green	Mia Spencer	455	32.4	
Liberal Democrats	Josh Curtis-Hale	190	13.5	
Conservative	Julie Marionneau	181	12.9	
Liberal Democrats	Peter George	180	12.8	
Conservative	Joshua O'Connor	132	9.4	
Turnout			29.4	
Labour win (new boundaries)				
Labour win (new boundaries)				

== 2002–2022 Lewisham council elections ==
Lewisham Central ward boundaries from 2002 to 2022

The ward created in 2002 covered Lewisham town centre including the station, as well as Hither Green (west of the railway line) and part of Ladywell and St John's.

=== 2018 election ===
The election took place on 3 May 2018.

2018 Lewisham London Borough Council election: Lewisham Central
Party	Candidate	Votes	%	±%
Labour	Aisling Gallagher	2,821	56.4	
Labour	Patrick Codd	2,776	55.5	
Labour	Joani Reid	2,607	52.2	
Green	Eugenia Barnett	776	15.5	
Liberal Democrats	Katie Anderson	653	13.1	
Green	Claire Cooper	642	12.8	
Conservative	Andrew Hughes	619	12.4	
Conservative	Joshua O'Connor	490	9.8	
Liberal Democrats	David Williamson	485	9.7	
Conservative	Gareth Milner	478	9.6	
Liberal Democrats	Marc Postle	468	9.4	
Women's Equality	Mandu Reid	428	8.6	
Green	Charles Guille	415	8.3	
Majority				
Turnout			35	
Labour hold		Swing		
Labour hold		Swing		
Labour hold		Swing		

=== 2014 election ===
The election took place on 22 May 2014.

=== 2010 election ===
The election on 6 May 2010 took place on the same day as the United Kingdom general election.

=== 2006 election ===
The election took place on 4 May 2006.

2006 Lewisham London Borough Council election: Lewisham Central
Party	Candidate	Votes	%	±%
Liberal Democrats	Andrew Milton	1,340	41.0	
Liberal Democrats	David Edgerton	1,033		
Labour	Edward Mark	988	30.3	
Labour	Anthony Kendall	962		
Labour	James Stevenson	957		
Liberal Democrats	Akbar Aghamiri	949		
Green	Diana Birch	523	16.0	
Green	Andrew Smith	491		
Conservative	Maria McInnes	414	12.7	
Conservative	David Gold	391		
Green	Trottie Kirwan	387		
Conservative	Hans Hansen	363		
Turnout			31.2	
Liberal Democrats gain from Labour		Swing		
Liberal Democrats gain from Labour		Swing		
Labour hold		Swing		

=== 2002 election ===
The election took place on 2 May 2002.
