= List of electoral wards in Surrey =

This is a list of electoral divisions and wards in the ceremonial county of Surrey in South East England. All changes since the re-organisation of local government following the passing of the Local Government Act 1972 are shown. The number of councillors elected for each electoral division or ward is shown in brackets.

== County council ==
=== Surrey ===
Electoral Divisions from 1 April 1974 (first election 12 April 1973) to 7 May 1981:

1. Addlestone (1)
2. Ash (1)
3. Ashford East & Laleham (1)
4. Ashford West (1)
5. Banstead (North East) (1)
6. Banstead (North West) (1)
7. Banstead (South) (1)
8. Camberley (East) (1)
9. Camberley (West) (1)
10. Caterham Hill (1)
11. Caterham Valley (1)
12. Chertsey (1)
13. Chobham & Bisley (1)
14. Dorking (North) (1)
15. Dorking (South) (1)
16. Dorking Rural (1)
17. Egham (North) (1)
18. Egham (South) (1)
19. Epsom & Ewell (North East) (1)
20. Epsom & Ewell (North) (1)
21. Epsom & Ewell (South East) (1)
22. Epsom & Ewell (South West) (1)
23. Epsom & Ewell (West) (1)
24. Esher No. 1 (Claygate & Esher) (1)
25. Esher No. 2 (Long Ditton & Hinchley (1)
26. Esher No. 3 (Cobham) (1)
27. Esher No. 4 (Molesey) (1)
28. Esher No. 5 (Thames Ditton) (1)
29. Farnham (North) (1)
30. Farnham (South) (1)
31. Frimley (1)
32. Godalming (1)
33. Godstone (North East) (1)
34. Godstone (North West) (1)
35. Godstone (South East) (1)
36. Godstone (South West) (1)
37. Guildford (East) (1)
38. Guildford (North) (1)
39. Guildford (South) (1)
40. Guildford (West) (1)
41. Hambledon (Central) (1)
42. Hambledon (East) (1)
43. Hambledon (West) (1)
44. Haslemere (1)
45. Horsleys (1)
46. Leatherhead (Central) (1)
47. Leatherhead (East) (1)
48. Leatherhead (West) (1)
49. New Haw (1)
50. Reigate (East) (1)
51. Reigate (North West) (1)
52. Reigate (South Central) (1)
53. Reigate (South West) (1)
54. Shalford (1)
55. Shepperton (1)
56. Shere (1)
57. Staines (1)
58. Stanwell (1)
59. Sunbury (1)
60. Sunbury Common & Ashford Common (1)
61. Walton & Weybridge No. 1 (Hersham) (1)
62. Walton & Weybridge No. 2 (Walton So (1)
63. Walton & Weybridge No. 3 (Walton on (1)
64. Walton & Weybridge No. 4 (Weybridge (1)
65. Warlingham (1)
66. Windlesham (1)
67. Woking (Central) (1)
68. Woking (East) (1)
69. Woking (North) (1)
70. Woking (South) (1)
71. Woking (West) (1)
72. Worplesdon (1)

Electoral Divisions from 7 May 1981 to 5 May 2005:

1. Addlestone (1)
2. Ash (1)
3. Ashford East (1)
4. Ashford West (1)
5. Ashtead (1)
6. Banstead East (1)
7. Banstead South (1)
8. Banstead West (1)
9. Bookham & Fetcham West (1)
10. Camberley East (1)
11. Camberley West (1)
12. Caterham Hill (1)
13. Caterham Valley (1)
14. Chertsey (1)
15. Chobham & Bisley (1)
16. Claygate & Hinchley Wood (1)
17. Cobham & Oxshott (1)
18. Dorking North (1)
19. Dorking Rural (1)
20. Dorking South (1)
21. Egham North (1)
22. Egham South (1)
23. Epsom & Ewell North East (1)
24. Epsom & Ewell Southeast (1)
25. Epsom & Ewell Southwest (1)
26. Epsom & Ewell West (1)
27. Esher & Molesey East (1)
28. Ewell Court Auriol & Cuddington (1)
29. Farnham Central (1)
30. Farnham North (1)
31. Farnham South (1)
32. Frimley Green & Mytchett (1)
33. Godalming North (1)
34. Godalming South & Rural (1)
35. Godstone (1)
36. Guildford East (1)
37. Guildford North (1)
38. Guildford South (1)
39. Guildford West (1)
40. Haslemere (1)
41. Heatherside & Parkside (1)
42. Hersham (1)
43. Horley East & Salfords (1)
44. Horley West (1)
45. Horsleys (1)
46. Laleham & Shepperton Green (1)
47. Leatherhead & Fetcham E. (1)
48. Lingfield (1)
49. Molesey West (1)
50. New Haw (1)
51. Oxted (1)
52. Reigate Central (1)
53. Reigate East (1)
54. Reigate North (1)
55. Reigate South (1)
56. Shalford (1)
57. Shepperton (1)
58. Shere (1)
59. Staines (1)
60. Stanwell (1)
61. Sunbury (1)
62. The Dittons (1)
63. Walton South & Oatlands (1)
64. Walton-on-Thames (1)
65. Warlingham (1)
66. Waverley East (1)
67. Waverley West (1)
68. Weybridge (1)
69. Windlesham (1)
70. Woking East (1)
71. Woking North (1)
72. Woking South (1)
73. Woking Southeast (1)
74. Woking Southwest (1)
75. Woking West (1)
76. Worplesdon (1)

Electoral Divisions from 5 May 2005 to 2 May 2013:

1. Addlestone (1)
2. Ash (1)
3. Ashford (1)
4. Ashtead (1)
5. Banstead East (1)
6. Banstead South (1)
7. Banstead West (1)
8. Bisley, Chobham & West End (1)
9. Bookham & Fetcham West (1)
10. Camberley East (1)
11. Camberley West (1)
12. Caterham Hill (1)
13. Caterham Valley (1)
14. Chertsey (1)
15. Cobham (1)
16. Cranleigh & Ewhurst (1)
17. Dorking & the Holmwoods (1)
18. Dorking Hills (1)
19. Dorking Rural (1)
20. Earlswood & Reigate South (1)
21. East Molesey & Esher (1)
22. Egham Hythe & Thorpe (1)
23. Englefield Green (1)
24. Epsom & Ewell North (1)
25. Epsom & Ewell North East (1)
26. Epsom & Ewell South East (1)
27. Epsom & Ewell South West (1)
28. Epsom & Ewell West (1)
29. Farnham Central (1)
30. Farnham North (1)
31. Farnham South (1)
32. Foxhills & Virginia Water (1)
33. Frimley Green & Mytchett (1)
34. Godalming North (1)
35. Godalming South, Milford & Witley (1)
36. Godstone (1) †
37. Guildford East (1)
38. Guildford North (1)
39. Guildford South East (1)
40. Guildford South West (1)
41. Guildford West (1)
42. Haslemere (1)
43. Heatherside & Parkside (1)
44. Hersham (1)
45. Hinchley Wood, Claygate & Oxshott (1)
46. Horley East (1)
47. Horley West (1)
48. Horsell (1)
49. Horsleys (1)
50. Knaphill (1)
51. Laleham & Shepperton (1)
52. Leatherhead & Fetcham East (1)
53. Lingfield (1) †
54. Lower Sunbury & Halliford (1)
55. Merstham & Reigate Hill (1)
56. Oxted (1)
57. Pyrford (1)
58. Redhill (1)
59. Reigate Central (1)
60. Shalford (1)
61. Shere (1)
62. St Johns & Brookwood (1)
63. Staines (1)
64. Staines South & Ashford West (1)
65. Stanwell & Stanwell Moor (1)
66. Sunbury Common & Ashford Common (1)
67. The Byfleets (1)
68. The Dittons (1)
69. Walton (1)
70. Walton South & Oatlands (1)
71. Warlingham (1)
72. Waverley Eastern Villages (1)
73. Waverley Western Villages (1)
74. West Molesey (1)
75. Weybridge (1)
76. Windlesham (1)
77. Woking Central (1)
78. Woking South (1)
79. Woodham & New Haw (1)
80. Worplesdon (1)

† minor boundary changes in 2009

Electoral Divisions from 2 May 2013 to 1 April 2027 (council to be abolished):

1. Addlestone (1)
2. Ash (1)
3. Ashford (1)
4. Ashtead (1)
5. Bagshot, Windlesham & Chobham (1)
6. Banstead, Woodmansterne & Chipstead (1)
7. Bookham & Fetcham West (1)
8. Camberley East (1)
9. Camberley West (1)
10. Caterham Hill (1)
11. Caterham Valley (1)
12. Chertsey (1)
13. Cobham (1)
14. Cranleigh & Ewhurst (1)
15. Dorking Hills (1)
16. Dorking Rural (1)
17. Dorking South & The Holmwoods (1)
18. Earlswood & Reigate South (1)
19. East Molesey & Esher (1)
20. Egham (1)
21. Englefield Green (1)
22. Epsom Town & Downs (1)
23. Epsom West (1)
24. Ewell (1)
25. Ewell Court, Auriol & Cuddington (1)
26. Farnham Central (1)
27. Farnham North (1)
28. Farnham South (1)
29. Foxhills, Thorpe & Virginia Water (1)
30. Frimley Green & Mytchett (1)
31. Godalming North (1)
32. Godalming South, Milford & Witley (1)
33. Godstone (1)
34. Goldsworth East & Horsell Village (1)
35. Guildford East (1)
36. Guildford North (1)
37. Guildford South East (1)
38. Guildford South West (1)
39. Guildford West (1)
40. Haslemere (1)
41. Heatherside & Parkside (1)
42. Hersham (1)
43. Hinchley Wood, Claygate & Oxshott (1)
44. Horley East (1)
45. Horley West, Salfords & Sidlow (1)
46. Horsleys (1)
47. Knaphill & Goldsworth West (1)
48. Laleham & Shepperton (1)
49. Leatherhead & Fetcham East (1)
50. Lightwater, West End & Bisley (1)
51. Lingfield (1)
52. Lower Sunbury & Halliford (1)
53. Merstham & Banstead South (1)
54. Nork & Tattenhams (1)
55. Oxted (1)
56. Redhill East (1)
57. Redhill West & Meadvale (1)
58. Reigate (1)
59. Shalford (1)
60. Shere (1)
61. Staines (1)
62. Staines South & Ashford West (1)
63. Stanwell & Stanwell Moor (1)
64. Sunbury Common & Ashford Common (1)
65. Tadworth, Walton & Kingswood (1)
66. The Byfleets (1)
67. The Dittons (1)
68. Walton (1)
69. Walton South & Oatlands (1)
70. Warlingham (1)
71. Waverley Eastern Villages (1)
72. Waverley Western Villages (1)
73. West Ewell (1)
74. West Molesey (1)
75. Weybridge (1)
76. Woking North (1)
77. Woking South (1)
78. Woking South East (1)
79. Woking South West (1)
80. Woodham & New Haw (1)
81. Worplesdon (1)

== Planned unitary authorities ==
=== East Surrey ===
Wards from 1 April 2027 (first election 7 May 2026) to present:

1. Ashtead (2)
2. Banstead, Woodmansterne & Chipstead (2)
3. Bookham & Fetcham West (2)
4. Caterham Hill (2)
5. Caterham Valley (2)
6. Cobham & Oxshott South (2)
7. Dorking (2)
8. Dorking Hills (2)
9. Dorking Rural (2)
10. Earlswood & Reigate South (2)
11. Epsom Town & Downs (2)
12. Epsom West (2)
13. Ewell Court, Auriol & Cuddington (2)
14. Ewell Village, Stoneleigh & Nonsuch (2)
15. Esher, Claygate & Oxshott North (2)
16. Godstone (2)
17. Hersham (2)
18. Horley East (2)
19. Horley West, Salfords & Sidlow (2)
20. Leatherhead & Fetcham East (2)
21. Lingfield (2)
22. Long Ditton, Hinchley Wood & Weston Green (2)
23. Merstham & Banstead South (2)
24. Nork & Tattenhams (2)
25. Oxted (2)
26. Redhill East & North Earlswood (2)
27. Redhill West & Meadvale (2)
28. Reigate (2)
29. Tadworth, Walton & Kingswood (2)
30. Thames Ditton & East Molesey (2)
31. Warlingham (2)
32. Walton (2)
33. Walton South & Oatlands (2)
34. West Ewell (2)
35. West Molesey (2)
36. Weybridge (2)

=== West Surrey ===
Wards from 1 April 2027 (first election 7 May 2026) to present:

1. Addlestone (2)
2. Ash (2)
3. Ashford (2)
4. Bagshot, Windlesham & Chobham (2)
5. Camberley East (2)
6. Camberley West and Frimley (2)
7. Chertsey (2)
8. Cranleigh & Ewhurst (2)
9. Egham (2)
10. Englefield Green & Virginia Water (2)
11. Farnham Central (2)
12. Farnham North (2)
13. Farnham South (2)
14. Frimley Green & Mytchett (2)
15. Godalming North (2)
16. Godalming South, Milford & Witley (2)
17. Goldsworth East & Horsell Village (2)
18. Guildford East (2)
19. Guildford North (2)
20. Guildford South East (2)
21. Guildford South West (2)
22. Guildford West (2)
23. Haslemere (2)
24. Heatherside & Parkside (2)
25. Horsleys (2)
26. Knaphill & Goldsworth West (2)
27. Laleham & Shepperton (2)
28. Lightwater, West End & Bisley (2)
29. Lower Sunbury & Halliford (2)
30. Shalford (2)
31. Shere (2)
32. Staines (2)
33. Staines South & Ashford West (2)
34. Stanwell, Stanwell Moor & Ashford North (2)
35. Sunbury Common & Ashford Common (2)
36. The Byfleets (2)
37. Thorpe, Longcross & Ottershaw (2)
38. Waverley Eastern Villages (2)
39. Waverley Western Villages (2)
40. Woking North (2)
41. Woking South (2)
42. Woking South East (2)
43. Woking South West (2)
44. Woodham & New Haw (2)
45. Worplesdon (2)

== District councils ==
=== Elmbridge ===
Wards from 1 April 1974 (first election 7 June 1973) to 6 May 1976:

Wards from 6 May 1976 to 4 May 2000:

Wards from 4 May 2000 to 5 May 2016:

1. Claygate (3)
2. Cobham & Downside (3)
3. Cobham Fairmile (2)
4. Esher (3)
5. Hersham North (3)
6. Hersham South (3)
7. Hinchley Wood (2)
8. Long Ditton (3)
9. Molesey East (3)
10. Molesey North (3)
11. Molesey South (3)
12. Oatlands Park (3)
13. Oxshott & Stoke D'Abernon (3)
14. St George’s Hill (3)
15. Thames Ditton (3)
16. Walton Ambleside (2)
17. Walton Central (3)
18. Walton North (3)
19. Walton South (3)
20. Weston Green (2)
21. Weybridge North (2)
22. Weybridge South (2)

Wards from 5 May 2016 to 1 April 2027 (council to be abolished):

1. Claygate (3)
2. Cobham & Downside (3)
3. Esher (3)
4. Hersham Village (3)
5. Hinchley Wood & Weston Green (3)
6. Long Ditton (3)
7. Molesey East (3)
8. Molesey West (3)
9. Oatlands & Burwood Park (3)
10. Oxshott & Stoke D’Abernon (3)
11. Thames Ditton (3)
12. Walton Central (3)
13. Walton North (3)
14. Walton South (3)
15. Weybridge Riverside (3)
16. Weybridge St George’s Hill (3)

=== Epsom and Ewell ===
Wards from 1 April 1974 (first election 7 June 1973) to 6 May 1976:

Wards from 6 May 1976 to 1 May 2003:

Wards from 1 May 2003 to 4 May 2023:

1. Auriol (2)
2. College (3)
3. Court (3)
4. Cuddington (3)
5. Ewell (3)
6. Ewell Court (3)
7. Nonsuch (3)
8. Ruxley (3)
9. Stamford (3)
10. Stoneleigh (3)
11. Town (3)
12. West Ewell (3)
13. Woodcote (3)

Wards from 4 May 2023 to 1 April 2027 (council to be abolished):

1. Auriol (2)
2. College (3)
3. Court (3)
4. Cuddington (3)
5. Ewell Court (2)
6. Ewell Village (2)
7. Horton (2)
8. Nonsuch (3)
9. Ruxley (2)
10. Stamford (2)
11. Stoneleigh (2)
12. Town (3)
13. West Ewell (3)
14. Woodcote & Langley Vale (3)

=== Guildford ===
Wards from 1 April 1974 (first election 7 June 1973) to 6 May 1976:

Wards from 6 May 1976 to 1 May 2003:

Wards from 1 May 2003 to 4 May 2023:

1. Ash South & Tongham (3)
2. Ash Vale (2)
3. Ash Wharf (2)
4. Burpham (2)
5. Christchurch (2)
6. Clandon & Horsley (3)
7. Effingham (1)
8. Friary & St Nicolas (3)
9. Holy Trinity (3)
10. Lovelace (1)
11. Merrow (3)
12. Normandy (1)
13. Onslow (3)
14. Pilgrims (1)
15. Pirbright (1)
16. Send (2)
17. Shalford (2)
18. Stoke (2)
19. Stoughton (3)
20. Tillingbourne (2)
21. Westborough (3)
22. Worplesdon (3)

Wards from 4 May 2023 to 1 April 2027 (council to be abolished):

1. Ash South (2)
2. Ash Vale (2)
3. Ash Wharf (2)
4. Bellfields & Slyfield (2)
5. Burpham (2)
6. Castle (3)
7. Clandon & Horsley (3)
8. Effingham (1)
9. Merrow (3)
10. Normandy & Pirbright (2)
11. Onslow (3)
12. Pilgrims (2)
13. Send & Lovelace (3)
14. Shalford (2)
15. St Nicolas (1)
16. Stoke (3)
17. Stoughton North (2)
18. Stoughton South (2)
19. Tillingbourne (2)
20. Westborough (3)
21. Worplesdon (3)

=== Mole Valley ===
Wards from 1 April 1974 (first election 7 June 1973) to 6 May 1976:

Wards from 6 May 1976 to 4 May 2000:

Wards from 4 May 2000 to 4 May 2023:

1. Ashtead Common (2)
2. Ashtead Park (2)
3. Ashtead Village (3)
4. Beare Green (1)
5. Bookham North (3)
6. Bookham South (3)
7. Box Hill & Headley (1)
8. Brockham, Betchworth & Buckland (2)
9. Capel, Leigh & Newdigate (2)
10. Charlwood (1)
11. Dorking North (2)
12. Dorking South (3)
13. Fetcham East (2)
14. Fetcham West (2)
15. Holmwoods (3)
16. Leatherhead North (3)
17. Leatherhead South (2)
18. Leith Hill (1)
19. Mickleham, Westhumble & Pixham (1)
20. Okewood (1)
21. Westcott (1)

Wards from 4 May 2023 to 1 April 2027 (council to be abolished):

1. Ashtead Lanes & Common (3)
2. Ashtead Park (3)
3. Bookham East & Eastwick Park (3)
4. Bookham West (3)
5. Brockham, Betchworth, Buckland, Box Hill & Headley (3)
6. Capel, Leigh, Newdigate & Charlwood (3)
7. Dorking North (3)
8. Dorking South (3)
9. Fetcham (3)
10. Holmwoods & Beare Green (3)
11. Leatherhead North (3)
12. Leatherhead South (3)
13. Mickleham, Westcott & Okewood (3)

=== Reigate and Banstead ===
Wards from 1 April 1974 (first election 7 June 1973) to 3 May 1979:

Wards from 3 May 1979 to 4 May 2000:

Wards from 4 May 2000 to 2 May 2019:

1. Banstead Village (3)
2. Chipstead, Hooley & Woodmansterne (3)
3. Earlswood & Whitebushes (3)
4. Horley Central (3)
5. Horley East (2)
6. Horley West (3)
7. Kingswood with Burgh Heath (3)
8. Meadvale & St John's (3)
9. Merstham (3)
10. Nork (3)
11. Preston (1)
12. Redhill East (3)
13. Redhill West (3)
14. Reigate Central (3)
15. Reigate Hill (2)
16. Salfords & Sidlow (1)
17. South Park & Woodhatch (3)
18. Tadworth & Walton (3)
19. Tattenhams (3)

Wards from 2 May 2019 to present:

1. Banstead Village (3)
2. Chipstead, Kingswood & Woodmansterne (3)
3. Earlswood & Whitebushes (3)
4. Hooley, Merstham & Netherne (3)
5. Horley Central & South (3)
6. Horley East & Salfords (3)
7. Horley West & Sidlow (3)
8. Lower Kingswood, Tadworth & Walton (3)
9. Meadvale & St John's (3)
10. Nork (3)
11. Redhill East (3)
12. Redhill West & Wray Common (3)
13. Reigate (3)
14. South Park & Woodhatch (3)
15. Tattenham Corner & Preston (3)

=== Runnymede ===
Wards from 1 April 1974 (first election 7 June 1973) to 6 May 1976:

Wards from 6 May 1976 to 4 May 2000:

Wards from 4 May 2000 to 2 May 2019:

1. Addlestone Bourneside (3)
2. Addlestone North (3)
3. Chertsey Meads (3)
4. Chertsey St Ann's (3)
5. Chertsey South & Row Town (3)
6. Egham Hythe (3)
7. Egham Town (3)
8. Englefield Green East (3)
9. Englefield Green West (3)
10. Foxhills (3)
11. New Haw (3)
12. Thorpe (3)
13. Virginia Water (3)
14. Woodham (3)

Wards from 2 May 2019 to 1 April 2027 (council to be abolished):

1. Addlestone North (3)
2. Addlestone South (3)
3. Chertsey Riverside (3)
4. Chertsey St Ann’s (3)
5. Egham Hythe (3)
6. Egham Town (3)
7. Englefield Green East (2)
8. Englefield Green West (3)
9. Longcross, Lyne & Chertsey South (3)
10. New Haw (3)
11. Ottershaw (3)
12. Thorpe (3)
13. Virginia Water (3)
14. Woodham & Rowtown (3)

=== Spelthorne ===
Wards from 1 April 1974 (first election 7 June 1973) to 3 May 1979:

Wards from 3 May 1979 to 1 May 2003:

Wards from 1 May 2003 to 1 April 2027 (council to be abolished):

1. Ashford Common (3)
2. Ashford East (3)
3. Ashford North & Stanwell South (3)
4. Ashford Town (3)
5. Halliford & Sunbury West (3)
6. Laleham & Shepperton Green (3)
7. Riverside & Laleham (3)
8. Shepperton Town (3)
9. Staines (3)
10. Staines South (3)
11. Stanwell North (3)
12. Sunbury Common (3)
13. Sunbury East (3)

=== Surrey Heath ===
Wards from 1 April 1974 (first election 7 June 1973) to 6 May 1976:

Wards from 6 May 1976 to 1 May 2003:

Wards from 1 May 2003 to 2 May 2019:

1. Bagshot (3)
2. Bisley (2)
3. Chobham (2)
4. Frimley (3)
5. Frimley Green (3)
6. Heatherside (3)
7. Lightwater (3)
8. Mytchett & Deepcut (3)
9. Old Dean (2)
10. Parkside (3)
11. St Michaels (2)
12. St Pauls (3)
13. Town (2)
14. Watchetts (2)
15. West End (2)
16. Windlesham (2)

Wards from 2 May 2019 to 1 April 2027 (council to be abolished):

1. Bagshot (3)
2. Bisley & West End (3)
3. Frimley (2)
4. Frimley Green (3)
5. Heatherside (3)
6. Lightwater (3)
7. Mytchett & Deepcut (3)
8. Old Dean (2)
9. Parkside (2)
10. St Michaels (2)
11. St Pauls (2)
12. Town (2)
13. Watchetts (2)
14. Windlesham & Chobham (3)

=== Tandridge ===
Wards from 1 April 1974 (first election 7 June 1973) to 6 May 1976:

Wards from 6 May 1976 to 4 May 2000:

Wards from 4 May 2000 to 2 May 2024:

1. Bletchingley & Nutfield (3) †
2. Burstow, Horne & Outwood (3) †
3. Chaldon (1)
4. Dormansland & Felcourt (2)
5. Felbridge (1)
6. Godstone (3)
7. Harestone (2)
8. Limpsfield (2)
9. Lingfield & Crowhurst (2)
10. Oxted North & Tandridge (3)
11. Oxted South (3)
12. Portley (2)
13. Queens Park (2)
14. Tatsfield & Titsey (1)
15. Valley (2)
16. Warlingham East & Chelsham & Farleigh (3)
17. Warlingham West (2)
18. Westway (2)
19. Whyteleafe (2)
20. Woldingham (1)

† minor boundary changes in 2007

Wards from 2 May 2024 to 1 April 2027 (council to be abolished):

1. Bletchingley & Nutfield (3)
2. Burstow, Horne & Outwood (3)
3. Chaldon (1)
4. Dormansland & Felbridge (3)
5. Godstone (3)
6. Harestone (2)
7. Limpsfield (2)
8. Lingfield & Crowhurst (3)
9. Oxted North (3)
10. Oxted South (3)
11. Portley & Queens Park (3)
12. Tatsfield & Titsey (1)
13. Valley (2)
14. Warlingham East & Chelsham & Farleigh (3)
15. Warlingham West (2)
16. Westway (3)
17. Whyteleafe (2)
18. Woldingham (1)

=== Waverley ===
Wards from 1 April 1974 (first election 7 June 1973) to 5 May 1983:

Wards from 5 May 1983 to 1 May 2003:

Wards from 1 May 2003 to 4 May 2023:

1. Alfold, Cranleigh Rural & Ellens Green (1)
2. Blackheath & Wonersh (1)
3. Bramley, Busbridge & Hascombe (2)
4. Chiddingfold & Dunsfold (2)
5. Cranleigh East (3)
6. Cranleigh West (2)
7. Elstead & Thursley (2)
8. Ewhurst (1)
9. Farnham Bourne (2)
10. Farnham Castle (2)
11. Farnham Firgrove (2)
12. Farnham Hale & Heath End (2)
13. Farnham Moor Park (2)
14. Farnham Shortheath & Boundstone (2)
15. Farnham Upper Hale (2)
16. Farnham Weybourne & Badshot Lea (2)
17. Farnham Wrecclesham & Rowledge (2)
18. Frensham, Dockenfield & Tilford (2)
19. Godalming Binscombe (2)
20. Godalming Central & Ockford (2)
21. Godalming Charterhouse (2)
22. Godalming Farncombe & Catteshall (2)
23. Godalming Holloway (2)
24. Haslemere Critchmere & Shottermill (3)
25. Haslemere East & Grayswood (2); changed to (3) in 2007
26. Hindhead (3); changed to (2) in 2007
27. Milford (2)
28. Shamley Green & Cranleigh North (1)
29. Witley & Hambledon (2)

Wards from 4 May 2023 to 1 April 2027 (council to be abolished):

1. Alfold, Dunsfold & Hascombe (2)
2. Bramley & Wonersh (3)
3. Chiddingfold (1)
4. Cranleigh East (3)
5. Cranleigh West (2)
6. Elstead & Peper Harow (1)
7. Ewhurst & Ellens Green (1)
8. Farnham Bourne (2)
9. Farnham Castle (2)
10. Farnham Firgrove (2)
11. Farnham Heath End (2)
12. Farnham Moor Park (2)
13. Farnham North West (2)
14. Farnham Rowledge (2)
15. Farnham Weybourne (2)
16. Godalming Binscombe & Charterhouse (3)
17. Godalming Central & Ockford (2)
18. Godalming Farncombe & Catteshall (2)
19. Godalming Holloway (2)
20. Haslemere East (3)
21. Haslemere West (2)
22. Hindhead & Beacon Hill (2)
23. Milford & Witley (3)
24. Western Commons (2)

=== Woking ===
Wards from 1 April 1974 (first election 7 June 1973) to 6 May 1976:

Wards from 6 May 1976 to 4 May 2000:

Wards from 4 May 2000 to 5 May 2016:

1. Brookwood (1)
2. Byfleet (3)
3. Goldsworth East (3)
4. Goldsworth West (2)
5. Hermitage & Knaphill South (2)
6. Horsell East & Woodham (2)
7. Horsell West (3)
8. Kingfield & Westfield (2)
9. Knaphill (3)
10. Maybury & Sheerwater (3)
11. Mayford & Sutton Green (1)
12. Mount Hermon East (2)
13. Mount Hermon West (2)
14. Old Woking (1)
15. Pyrford (2)
16. St John’s & Hook Heath (2)
17. West Byfleet (2)

Wards from 5 May 2016 to 1 April 2027 (council to be abolished):

1. Byfleet & West Byfleet (3)
2. Canalside (3)
3. Goldsworth Park (3)
4. Heathlands (3)
5. Hoe Valley (3)
6. Horsell (3)
7. Knaphill (3)
8. Mount Hermon (3)
9. Pyrford (3)
10. St John’s (3)

== Electoral wards by constituency ==
Wards as they existed on 1 December 2020.

=== Dorking and Horley ===
Mole Valley: Beare Green; Bookham North; Bookham South; Box Hill & Headley; Brockham, Betchworth & Buckland; Capel, Leigh & Newdigate; Charlwood; Dorking North; Dorking South; Fetcham East; Fetcham West; Holmwoods; Leith Hill; Mickleham, Westhumble & Pixham; Okewood; Westcott.

Reigate and Banstead: Horley Central & South; Horley East & Salfords; Horley West & Sidlow.

Waverley: Ewhurst.

=== East Surrey ===
Reigate and Banstead: Hooley, Merstham & Netherne.

Tandridge: Bletchingley & Nutfield; Burstow, Horne & Outwood; Chaldon; Dormansland & Felcourt; Felbridge; Godstone; Harestone; Limpsfield; Lingfield & Crowhurst; Oxted North & Tandridge; Oxted South; Portley; Queens Park; Tatsfield & Titsey; Valley; Warlingham East & Chelsham & Farleigh; Warlingham West; Westway; Whyteleafe; Woldingham.

=== Epsom and Ewell ===
Epsom and Ewell: Auriol; College; Court; Cuddington; Ewell; Ewell Court; Nonsuch; Ruxley; Stamford; Stoneleigh; Town; West Ewell; Woodcote.

Mole Valley: Ashtead Common; Ashtead Park; Ashtead Village; Leatherhead North; Leatherhead South.

=== Esher and Walton ===
Elmbridge: Claygate; Esher; Hersham Village; Hinchley Wood & Weston Green; Long Ditton; Molesey East; Molesey West; Oatlands & Burwood Park; Thames Ditton; Walton Central; Walton North; Walton South.

=== Farnham and Bordon (part) ===
Waverley: Farnham Bourne; Farnham Castle; Farnham Firgrove; Farnham Hale & Heath End; Farnham Moor Park; Farnham Shortheath & Boundstone; Farnham Upper Hale; Farnham Weybourne & Badshot Lea; Farnham Wrecclesham & Rowledge; Frensham, Dockenfield & Tilford; Haslemere Critchmere & Shottermill; Haslemere East & Grayswood; Hindhead.

=== Godalming and Ash ===
Guildford: Ash South & Tongham; Ash Vale; Ash Wharf; Pilgrims; Shalford; Tillingbourne.

Waverley: Alfold, Cranleigh Rural & Ellens Green; Blackheath & Wonersh; Bramley, Busbridge & Hascombe; Chiddingfold & Dunsfold; Cranleigh East; Cranleigh West; Elstead & Thursley; Godalming Binscombe; Godalming Central & Ockford; Godalming Charterhouse; Godalming Farncombe & Catteshall; Godalming Holloway; Milford; Shamley Green & Cranleigh North; Witley & Hambledon.

=== Guildford ===
Guildford: Burpham; Christchurch; Clandon & Horsley; Effingham; Friary & St. Nicolas; Holy Trinity; Lovelace; Merrow; Onslow; Send; Stoke; Stoughton; Westborough; Worplesdon.

=== Reigate ===
Reigate and Banstead: Banstead Village; Chipstead, Kingswood & Woodmansterne; Earlswood & Whitebushes; Lower Kingswood, Tadworth & Walton; Meadvale & St. John’s; Nork; Redhill East; Redhill West & Wray Common; Reigate; South Park & Woodhatch; Tattenham Corner & Preston.

=== Runnymede and Weybridge ===
Elmbridge: Cobham & Downside; Oxshott & Stoke D’Abernon; Weybridge Riverside; Weybridge St. George’s Hill.

Runnymede: Addlestone North; Addlestone South; Chertsey Riverside; Chertsey St. Ann’s; Egham Hythe; Egham Town; Longcross, Lyne & Chertsey South; New Haw; Ottershaw; Thorpe; Woodham & Rowtown.

=== Spelthorne ===
Spelthorne: Ashford Common; Ashford East; Ashford North & Stanwell South; Ashford Town; Halliford & Sunbury West; Laleham & Shepperton Green; Riverside & Laleham; Shepperton Town; Staines; Staines South; Stanwell North; Sunbury Common; Sunbury East.

=== Surrey Heath ===
Guildford: Normandy; Pirbright.

Surrey Heath: Bagshot; Bisley & West End; Frimley; Frimley Green; Heatherside; Lightwater; Mytchett & Deepcut; Old Dean; Parkside; St Michaels; St Pauls; Town; Watchetts; Windlesham & Chobham.

=== Windsor (part) ===
Runnymede: Englefield Green East; Englefield Green West; Virginia Water.

=== Woking ===
Woking: Byfleet & West Byfleet; Canalside; Goldsworth Park; Heathlands; Hoe Valley; Horsell; Knaphill; Mount Hermon; Pyrford; St John’s.

== See also ==
- List of parliamentary constituencies in Surrey
