= Roger Berry =

British politician (born 1948)

Member of Parliament for Kingswood
- In office 9 April 1992 – 12 April 2010
- Preceded by: Robert Hayward
- Succeeded by: Chris Skidmore

Personal details
- Born: 4 July 1948 (age 78) Huddersfield, West Yorkshire, England
- Party: Labour
- Spouse: Alison Delyth
- Relations: Ruth Berry (Mother)
- Education: University of Bristol; University of Sussex

Roger Leslie Berry (born 4 July 1948) is a British Labour Party politician, who was the Member of Parliament (MP) for Kingswood from the 1992 general election until his defeat at the 2010 general election.

== Early life ==
Roger Berry was born in 1948 in Huddersfield and educated at the Dalton County Primary School in Huddersfield; Huddersfield New College; the University of Bristol, where he obtained a BSc in Economics in 1970; and the University of Sussex where he was awarded a DPhil in Economics in 1977. Berry lectured in Economics at the School of African and Asian Studies in London from 1973–4; Institute of Development Studies at the University of Sussex from 1973–4; the University of Papua New Guinea from 1974–8; and the University of Bristol from 1978–92. He was elected as a councillor to the Avon County Council in 1981, becoming the deputy in 1985 and the Labour group leader from 1986–92; he stood down from the council in 1993.

== Parliamentary career ==
Berry contested Weston-super-Mare at the 1983 general election but was defeated by Jerry Wiggin. Berry also unsuccessfully fought the seat of Bristol for the European Parliament in 1984.

Berry was selected to contest the marginal seat of Kingswood at the 1987 general election but was defeated by Conservative Robert Hayward by over 4,000 votes. Berry again contested Kingswood against Hayward at the 1992 general election and this time was victorious, winning the seat with a majority of 2,370. He made his maiden speech on 10 June 1992.

Berry was a frequent "rebel" against the Labour government after 1997. He was a Member of the Trade and Industry Committee. On 17 January 2007, he criticised the government for halting a corruption inquiry into arms sales to Saudi Arabia, saying it would do irreparable damage to Britain's reputation.

In December 2007 Berry added his name to a petition to save the threatened Cadbury's Somerdale Factory from demolition.

Early on in his parliamentary career, Berry became known as a disability rights activist, and was Secretary and Co-Chair of the All Party Parliamentary Disability Group.

Berry lost his seat to Conservative Party candidate Chris Skidmore in the 2010 general election. The seat was not very high among the Tory targets, and his defeat was the result of a swing of nearly 10% in favour of the Tories, with Labour Party officials blaming the result on a restructuring of constituency boundaries which were seen to favour the Tory vote.

After losing his seat, Berry became a trustee of the charity Disability Rights UK and served as chair of the Avon and Bristol Law Centre.

== Personal life ==
He married Alison Delyth in December 1996 in Pontypridd.
