= Chris Skidmore =

British politician and historian (born 1981)

The Right Honourable Chris Skidmore OBE FSA FRSA FRHistS
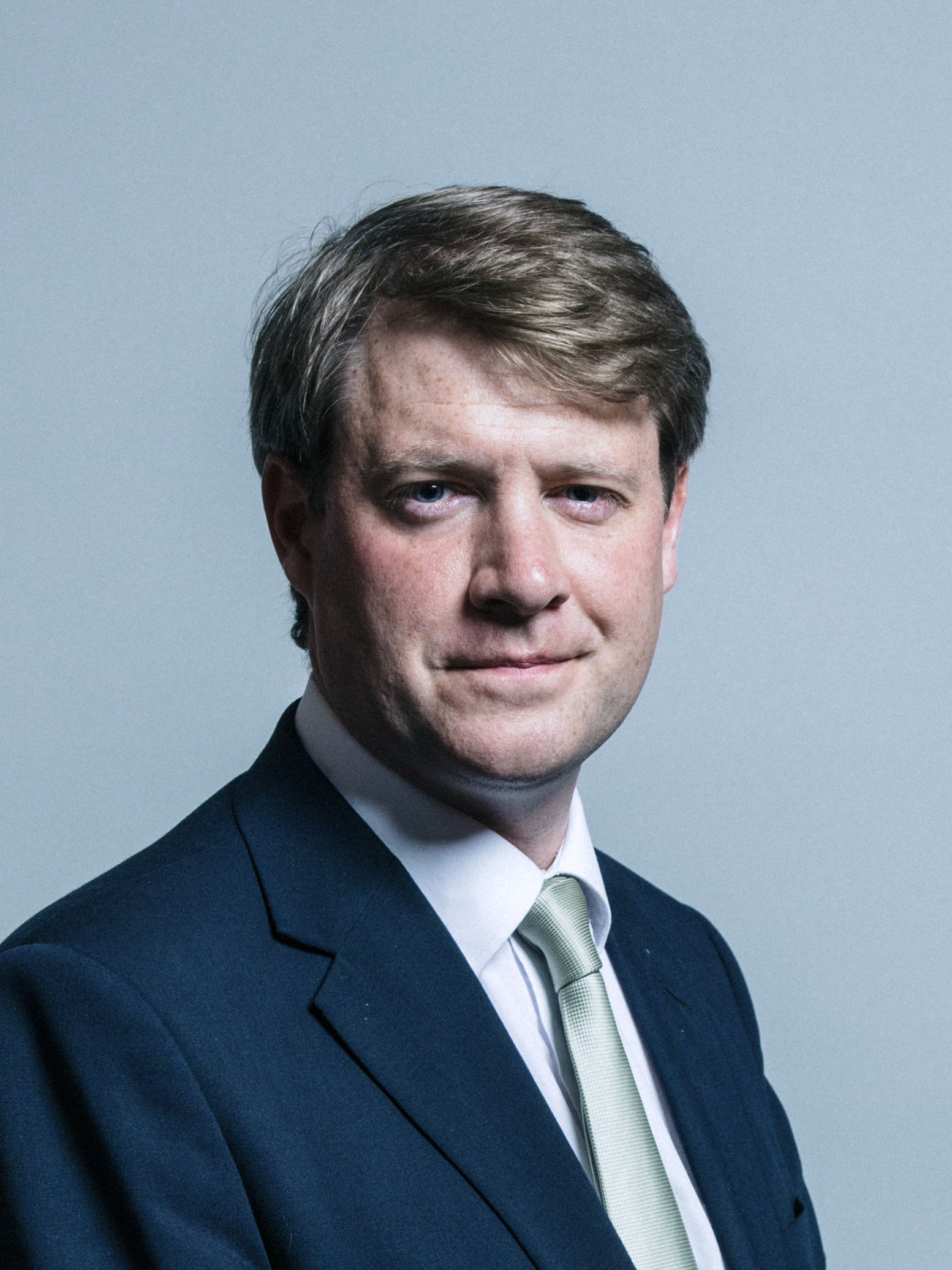
- Official portrait, 2017

Minister of State for Universities, Science, Research and Innovation
- In office 10 September 2019 – 13 February 2020
- Prime Minister: Boris Johnson
- Preceded by: Jo Johnson
- Succeeded by: Michelle Donelan (Note: As Minister of State for Universities); Amanda Solloway (Note: As Parliamentary Under-Secretary of State for Science, Research and Innovation)
- In office 5 December 2018 – 24 July 2019
- Prime Minister: Theresa May
- Preceded by: Sam Gyimah
- Succeeded by: Jo Johnson

Minister of State for Health
- In office 24 July 2019 – 10 September 2019
- Prime Minister: Boris Johnson
- Preceded by: Stephen Hammond
- Succeeded by: Edward Argar

Minister of State for Energy and Clean Growth
- In office 20 May 2019 – 24 July 2019 (Note: Claire Perry went on leave of absence from 20 May 2019 with Skidmore taking over in the interim until he was replaced by Kwasi Kwarteng when Boris Johnson became Prime Minister.)
- Prime Minister: Theresa May
- Preceded by: Claire Perry
- Succeeded by: Kwasi Kwarteng

Parliamentary Secretary for the Constitution
- In office 17 July 2016 – 8 January 2018
- Prime Minister: Theresa May
- Preceded by: John Penrose
- Succeeded by: Chloe Smith

Member of Parliament for Kingswood
- In office 6 May 2010 – 8 January 2024
- Preceded by: Roger Berry
- Succeeded by: Damien Egan

Personal details
- Born: 17 May 1981 (age 45) Bristol, England
- Party: Conservative (1996–2024)
- Education: Bristol Grammar School, Christ Church, Oxford (BA)

Christopher James Skidmore (born 17 May 1981) is a British former Conservative Party politician and author of popular history who served as Member of Parliament (MP) for Kingswood in South Gloucestershire from 2010 to 2024.

Skidmore was first elected at the 2010 general election. As a backbencher, he joined the Free Enterprise Group of Conservative MPs, founded by Liz Truss, and co-authored a number of papers and books, including After the Coalition (2011) and Britannia Unchained (2012). Following Theresa May's appointment as prime minister in July 2016, he was appointed Parliamentary Secretary for the Constitution; he was removed from this position in the January 2018 reshuffle, becoming the Conservative Party's policy vice chairman. He returned to government in 2018 as Minister of State for Universities, Science, Research and Innovation following Sam Gyimah's resignation. He was interim Minister of State for Energy and Clean Growth from May to July 2019: in this position, he signed the UK's Net Zero pledge into law.

Skidmore became Minister of State for Health after Boris Johnson became prime minister in July 2019. He returned to his former position of universities minister in September 2019 following Jo Johnson's resignation, and was dismissed from government in the February 2020 reshuffle. Skidmore chaired a review of the government's net-zero strategy in 2022 and 2023. He resigned as an MP in January 2024 over the proposed introduction of the government's Offshore Petroleum Licensing Bill.

== Early life and education ==
Skidmore was born on 17 May 1981 in Bristol, and grew up in Longwell Green and Bitton, Avon. In 1996, as a teenager, he became a member of the Conservative Party. Skidmore was educated at Bristol Grammar School, an independent day school, before attending Christ Church, Oxford, graduating in 2002 with a first-class degree in Modern History (BA). In 2001, he served as President of the Oxford Reform Club, whose ex-members include Liz Truss and Olly Robbins.

Skidmore worked for David Willetts and Michael Gove as an advisor, and served as chairman of the Bow Group for 2007–08, before being appointed by another right-leaning think tank, Policy Exchange, as a research fellow. He is the author of four books on medieval and Tudor history.

== Parliamentary career ==
After being selected to contest the marginal seat of Kingswood for the Conservatives in 2009, he was elected as its Member of Parliament at the 2010 general election, defeating incumbent Roger Berry of the Labour Party.

Skidmore served as a member of the Health Select Committee, leaving that committee on 17 June 2013 (being replaced by Charlotte Leslie), to sit on the Education Select Committee. He is also a member of the Free Enterprise Group of MPs, founded by Liz Truss, and along with Truss, Priti Patel, Kwasi Kwarteng and Dominic Raab, he co-authored After the Coalition (2011) and Britannia Unchained (2012).

He was re-elected with an increased majority at the general election in 2015 and became Parliamentary Private Secretary to the Chancellor of the Exchequer.

From 2016 to 2018, Skidmore was Parliamentary Secretary for the Constitution. Following the 2018 cabinet reshuffle, he was sacked from this role but given the role of vice-chairman of the Conservative Party for policy.

Skidmore was named by the ConservativeHome website in 2012 as one of a minority of loyal Conservative backbench MPs not to have voted against the government in any significant rebellions.

Skidmore was opposed to Brexit prior to the 2016 EU membership referendum. In February 2018, he argued in a speech to the Centre for Policy Studies that his party needed a broad and positive policy programme to gain wider support, further stating: "If we are just going to talk about Brexit then the Conservative Party will rapidly decline".

Skidmore was appointed Minister of State for Universities, Science, Research and Innovation on 5 December 2018, following Sam Gyimah's resignation over the government's Brexit policy.

He was appointed as interim Minister of State for Energy and Clean Growth from May to July 2019, covering for Claire Perry. In this role, on 27 June 2019, he signed the UK's Net Zero Pledge into law, becoming the first major economy to do so.

Following the appointment of Boris Johnson as Prime Minister in July 2019, Skidmore was moved to the Department for Health and Social Care, serving as the Minister of State for Health. After the resignation of Jo Johnson from cabinet, Skidmore re-assumed his position of minister of state for universities, science, research and innovation in September 2019. However, he was dismissed from government and replaced by Michelle Donelan as Minister of State for Universities and Amanda Solloway as Parliamentary Under-Secretary of State for Science, Research and Innovation in the cabinet reshuffle of February 2020.

Skidmore submitted a letter of no confidence in Boris Johnson on 6 July 2022 during mass resignations of government ministers. He initially supported Rishi Sunak in the July–September 2022 Conservative Party leadership election, but changed his support to Liz Truss.

=== Net zero ===
On 26 September 2022 Skidmore launched the Net Zero Review, pledging to use the review to focus on the UK's fight against climate change while maximising economic growth to ensure energy security and affordability for consumers and businesses.

On 19 October 2022, Skidmore put out a statement on Twitter, in advance of a debate on fracking, saying that "[a]s the former Energy Minister who signed Net Zero into law", he could not vote "to support fracking and undermine the pledges I made at the 2019 General Election". The government was reportedly treating this vote as a confidence vote, putting Skidmore at risk of losing the Conservative Party whip.

On 16 January 2023, Skidmore published "Mission Zero", the final report of the Net Zero Review. The 340-page report contained 129 recommendations on how to deliver the UK's net zero commitments. The report was published just weeks after Chris Skidmore declared he had taken up a paid role (£80,000 per annum) as adviser to the "Emissions Capture Company", for providing 160–192 hours per annum advice on the global energy transition and decarbonisation.

In June 2023, it was announced that Skidmore had been appointed to a professorship at the University of Bath to undertake research on sustainability and climate change.

=== Resignation ===
On 26 November 2022, Skidmore announced that he would not seek re-election as an MP at the next general election, later stating in Parliament that "my constituency of Kingswood is being formally abolished in the boundary changes and there is nowhere for me to go."

In the event, Skidmore announced on 5 January 2024 that he would resign his parliamentary seat in protest at the introduction of the Offshore Petroleum Licensing Bill, describing the relaxation of net zero targets as "the greatest mistake of [Rishi Sunak's] premiership". On 8 January, Skidmore formally submitted his resignation as an MP, which was effected on the same day by his appointment as Steward of the Chiltern Hundreds. In response to Skidmore's resignation statement, Karl McCartney, Tory MP for Lincoln, tweeted: "A now 'former colleague', who was gifted various positions, ahead of many better, well-qualified, and collegiate colleagues, dumps on all from a great height. Once more, another non-Conservative handpicked as part of [David] Cameron's A List."

Following his resignation from Parliament, Skidmore set out in his resignation letter his intention to focus on enabling the energy transition and deliver the net zero commitment he signed into law.

== Later career ==
Skidmore’s Net Zero Review, Mission Zero, was published as a book in late 2023, and received positive reviews in early 2024 upon publication. Having established the Mission Zero Coalition in 2023, to focus on delivering the recommendations in his Net Zero Review Skidmore continued to publish reports into early 2024, including Building The Future in March 2024 and At A Crossroads in June 2024, which was published on the fifth anniversary of Skidmore signing the UK’s net zero commitment into law, which he co-authored with Renewable UK CEO Dan McGrail.

In June 2024, at London Climate Action Week, former US Climate Envoy Secretary John Kerry launched the Climate Action Coalition, which Skidmore chairs. The Climate Action Coalition has launched several taskforces including the Global Clean Power Taskforce which Skidmore co-chairs with former UNFCCC Executive Secretary Patricia Espinosa Skidmore and Espinosa have written jointly on the opportunity that the global energy transition presents, and the need to focus on developing positive narratives to demonstrate the opportunity of the ‘electrotech revolution’.

Skidmore was also appointed as Chair of the Centre for Economic Transition Expertise (CETEX) at the Grantham Research Institute for Climate Change at the London School of Economics in November 2024.

In February 2025 Skidmore was announced as Chair of the UK Transition Finance Council working group on Policy Transition Finance Council. Skidmore gave a keynote speech at the UNEP-FI Sustainable Investment Forum in Paris in April 2025 setting out the work of the Council working group on Policy.

Skidmore helped launch Better Earth, a company that focuses on delivering the international energy transition in March 2024. In May 2024, it was announced that the former UK Prime Minister Boris Johnson would act as co-chair of Better Earth.

In July 2024, Skidmore announced the launch of Desmos Capital Partners, an advisory investment bank that would seek to help raise investment for sustainable companies. Skidmore is Chair of Desmos. In November Desmos announced that it was establishing four regional centres. Its mandates have included a $30 million raise for Meatable, while Desmos has announced its Senior Adviser network includes the former Assistant Secretary of Defense Brendan Owens and the former UK Minister for Africa, Andrew Stephenson.

Skidmore is also a founding Senior Advisor of the sustainable fund Smart Society Ventures and hosts a podcast, the Smart Society Show with co-host Brynne Kennedy.

On 20 June, Skidmore announced that in the 2024 UK general election he would vote Labour because of the party's Net Zero policies.

== Honours ==
- Fellowship of the Royal Society of Arts (FRSA) (2008)
- Fellowship of the Royal Historical Society (FRHistS) (2010)
- Fellowship of the Society of Antiquaries of London (FSA) (10 October 2014)
- Sworn in as a member of Her Majesty's Most Honourable Privy Council on 6 November 2019 at Buckingham Palace. This gave him the honorific title "The Right Honourable" for life.
- Appointed Officer of the Order of the British Empire (OBE) in the 2022 Birthday Honours for parliamentary and public service.

== Bibliography ==
- Edward VI: The Lost King of England (2007) ISBN 9780312351427
- Death and The Virgin: Elizabeth, Dudley and the Mysterious Fate of Amy Robsart (2010) ISBN 9780297846505
- Bosworth: The Birth of the Tudors (2013) ISBN 9780753828946 (published in the United States as The Rise of the Tudors: The Family That Changed English History, 2014)
- Richard III: Brother, Protector, King (2017) ISBN 9780297870784

== Notes ==
Parliament of the United Kingdom
Preceded by Roger Berry	Member of Parliament for Kingswood; 2010–2024	Succeeded by Damien Egan
Political offices
Preceded by John Penrose	Parliamentary Secretary for the Constitution; 2016–2018	Succeeded by Chloe Smith
Preceded by Sam Gyimah	Minister of State for Universities, Science, Research and Innovation; 2018–2019	Succeeded by Jo Johnson
Preceded by Stephen Hammond	Minister of State for Health; 2019	Succeeded by Edward Argar
Preceded by Jo Johnson	Minister of State for Universities, Science, Research and Innovation; 2019–2020	Succeeded by Michelle Donelan as Minister of State for Universities; Amanda Solloway as Parliamentary Under-Secretary of State for Science, Research and Innovation
