= Kingswood (constituency) =

UK Parliament constituency (1974–2024)

Coordinates: 51.462°N 2.504°W

- Former borough constituency for the House of Commons
- Boundary of Kingswood in Avon

- Location of Avon within England
- County: 1974–1997 Avon; 1997–present South Gloucestershire
- Electorate: 65,543 (2023)
- Major settlements: Kingswood

1974–2024
- Seats: One
- Created from: Bristol South East and South Gloucestershire
- Replaced by: Bristol North East; Filton and Bradley Stoke; North East Somerset and Hanham

Kingswood was a borough constituency for the House of Commons of the Parliament of the United Kingdom. It elected one Member of Parliament (MP) at least once every five years by the first-past-the-post electoral system.

The seat was abolished for the 2024 general election.

== History ==
The constituency existed from the February 1974 general election. It had been held by the Conservative and Labour parties. Before the 2010 election, when the seat was held by Labour, it was 135th on the Conservative Party target seats list and in the 2015 election it was 41st on the Labour Party's target seats.

On 26 November 2022, the previous MP, Conservative Chris Skidmore, announced that he would not seek re-election at the next election. On 5 January 2024, Skidmore announced he would resign from parliament "as soon as possible" in protest at the introduction of the Offshore Petroleum Licensing Bill. On 8 January 2024, he formally resigned as an MP which triggered a by-election. Labour's Damien Egan won the by-election, and would sit for it for the last four months of the constituency's existence before its abolition at the 2024 general election.

== Boundaries ==
Map of boundaries 2019–2024

1974–1983: The Urban Districts of Kingswood and Mangotsfield, alongside the Rural District of Warmley.

1983–1997: The District of Kingswood wards of Chase, Chiphouse, Downend, Forest, Hanham, Mangotsfield, New Cheltenham, Soundwell, Staple Hill, Woodstock, alongside the City of Bristol wards of Frome Vale, Hillfields, St George East, St George West.

1997–2010: The Borough of Kingswood wards of Badminton, Blackhorse, Bromley Heath, Chase, Chiphouse, Downend, Forest, Hanham, Mangotsfield, New Cheltenham, Oldland Barrs Court, Oldland Cadbury Heath, Oldland Longwell Green, Siston, Soundwell, Springfield, Staple Hill, Woodstock, alongside the City of Bristol wards of Frome Vale and Hillfields.

2010–2019: The District of South Gloucestershire wards of Bitton, Hanham, Kings Chase, Longwell Green, Oldland Common, Parkwall, Rodway, Siston, Woodstock.

2019 to 2024: The District of South Gloucestershire wards of Bitton and Oldland Common, Hanham, Kingswood, New Cheltenham, Woodstock, Longwell Green, Parkwall and Warmley.

The constituency covered part of the South Gloucestershire unitary authority, consisting of the eastern suburbs of Bristol and commuter villages outside of the city boundary, including the town of Kingswood. It largely corresponded to the former Borough of Kingswood.

The Boundary Commission's fifth periodic review of Westminster constituencies prompted the boundary changes with effect from the 2010 general election. In particular, all wards in the constituency were now from the South Gloucestershire authority. Prior to 2010, the Frome Vale and Hillfields wards of the City of Bristol were part of the Kingswood constituency, but were transferred to Bristol East. Within South Gloucestershire, the Kingswood seat gained Hanham, Bitton and Oldland Common from the former Wansdyke constituency, but lost Downend and Staple Hill to the new Filton and Bradley Stoke seat.

== Abolition ==
Further to the completion of the 2023 review of Westminster constituencies, the seat was abolished for the 2024 general election, with its contents distributed three ways:

- Southern areas, comprising the District of South Gloucestershire wards of Bitton and Oldland Common, Hanham, Longwell Green, and Parkwall and Warmley, included with the majority of North East Somerset to form the new constituency of North East Somerset and Hanham
- The town of Kingswood, comprising the Kingswood, New Cheltenham and Woodstock wards of South Gloucestershire, included in the re-established seat of Bristol North East
- Emersons Green transferred to Filton and Bradley Stoke

== Members of Parliament ==
Election	Member	Party
Feb 1974	Terry Walker	Labour
1979	Jack Aspinwall	Conservative
1983	Robert Hayward	Conservative
1992	Roger Berry	Labour
2010	Chris Skidmore	Conservative
2024	Chris Skidmore	Independent
2024 by-election	Damien Egan	Labour
2024	constituency abolished	

== Elections ==
=== Elections in the 2020s ===
2024 Kingswood by-election
Party	Candidate	Votes	%	±%
Labour	Damien Egan	11,176	44.9	+11.5
Conservative	Sam Bromiley	8,675	34.9	–21.3
Reform	Rupert Lowe	2,578	10.4	New
Green	Lorraine Francis	1,459	5.8	+3.4
Liberal Democrats	Andrew Brown	861	3.5	–3.4
UKIP	Nicholas Wood	129	0.5	New
Majority		2,501	10.0	N/A
Turnout		24,905	37.1	–34.4
Registered electors		67,103		
Labour gain from Conservative		Swing	+17.5	

=== Elections in the 2010s ===
General election 2019: Kingswood
Party	Candidate	Votes	%	±%
Conservative	Chris Skidmore	27,712	56.2	+1.3
Labour	Nicola Bowden-Jones	16,492	33.4	–6.1
Liberal Democrats	Dine Romero	3,421	6.9	+3.3
Green	Joseph Evans	1,200	2.4	+0.4
Animal Welfare	Angelika Cowell	489	1.0	New
Majority		11,220	22.8	+7.4
Turnout		49,314	71.5	+1.3
Registered electors		68,972		
Conservative hold		Swing	+3.7	

General election 2017: Kingswood
Party	Candidate	Votes	%	±%
Conservative	Chris Skidmore	26,754	54.9	+6.6
Labour	Mhairi Threlfall	19,254	39.5	+9.9
Liberal Democrats	Karen Wilkinson	1,749	3.6	–0.2
Green	Matt Furey-King	984	2.0	–0.8
Majority		7,500	15.4	–3.3
Turnout		48,741	70.2	–0.6
Registered electors		69,426		+2.1
Conservative hold		Swing	–1.7	

General election 2015: Kingswood
Party	Candidate	Votes	%	±%
Conservative	Chris Skidmore	23,252	48.3	+7.9
Labour	Jo McCarron	14,246	29.6	–5.7
UKIP	Duncan Odgers	7,133	14.8	+11.6
Liberal Democrats	Adam Boyden	1,827	3.8	–13.0
Green	Cezara Nanu	1,370	2.8	+2.0
BNP	Julie Lake	164	0.3	–2.4
TUSC	Richard Worth	84	0.2	New
Vapers in Power	Liam Bryan	49	0.1	New
Majority		9,006	18.7	+13.6
Turnout		48,125	70.8	–1.4
Registered electors		67,992		+2.5
Conservative hold		Swing	+6.8	

General election 2010: Kingswood
Party	Candidate	Votes	%	±%
Conservative	Chris Skidmore	19,362	40.4	+6.1
Labour	Roger Berry	16,917	35.3	–11.2
Liberal Democrats	Sally Fitzharris	8,072	16.8	–1.5
UKIP	Neil Dowdney	1,528	3.2	+0.8
BNP	Michael Carey	1,311	2.7	New
Green	Nick Foster	383	0.8	New
English Democrat	Michael Blundell	333	0.7	New
Majority		2,445	5.1	N/A
Turnout		47,906	72.2	+4.4
Registered electors		66,361		+2.2
Conservative gain from Labour		Swing	+8.6	

2005 notional result
Party	Vote	%
Labour	20,442	46.5
Conservative	15,109	34.3
Liberal Democrats	8,078	18.4
Others	362	0.8
Turnout	43,991	67.8
Electorate	64,921	

=== Elections in the 2000s ===
General election 2005: Kingswood
Party	Candidate	Votes	%	±%
Labour	Roger Berry	26,491	47.0	–7.9
Conservative	Owen Inskip	18,618	33.1	+4.7
Liberal Democrats	Geoff Brewer	9,089	16.1	+1.4
UKIP	John Knight	1,444	2.6	+0.5
Independent	David Burnside	669	1.2	New
Majority		7,873	13.9	–12.6
Turnout		56,311	66.7	+1.3
Registered electors		88,400		+4.8
Labour hold		Swing	–6.3	

General election 2001: Kingswood
Party	Candidate	Votes	%	±%
Labour	Roger Berry	28,903	54.9	+1.2
Conservative	Robert Marven	14,941	28.4	–1.5
Liberal Democrats	Christopher Greenfield	7,747	14.7	+1.8
UKIP	David Smith	1,085	2.1	New
Majority		13,962	26.5	+2.7
Turnout		52,676	65.4	–12.3
Registered electors		80,531		+4.6
Labour hold		Swing	+1.4	

=== Elections in the 1990s ===
General election 1997: Kingswood
Party	Candidate	Votes	%	±%
Labour	Roger Berry	32,181	53.7	+13.1
Conservative	Jon Howard	17,928	29.9	–15.9
Liberal Democrats	Jeanne Pinkerton	7,672	12.8	–0.8
Referendum	Alexandra Reather	1,463	2.4	New
BNP	Peter Hart	290	0.5	New
Natural Law	Andrew Harding	238	0.4	New
Independent	Andrew Nicolson	115	0.2	New
Majority		14,253	23.8	+18.6
Turnout		59,887	77.6	–6.8
Registered electors		77,026		+0.9
Labour gain from Conservative (Notional.)		Swing	+14.5	

1992 notional result
Party	Vote	%
Conservative	29,562	45.8
Labour	26,222	40.6
Liberal Democrats	8,771	13.6
Turnout	64,555	84.6
Electorate	76,320	

General election 1992: Kingswood
Party	Candidate	Votes	%	±%
Labour	Roger Berry	26,774	44.5	+7.1
Conservative	Robert Hayward	24,404	40.6	–4.3
Liberal Democrats	Jeanne Pinkerton	8,967	14.9	–2.8
Majority		2,370	3.9	N/A
Turnout		60,145	83.8	+3.7
Registered electors		71,727		–1.9
Labour gain from Conservative		Swing	+5.7	

=== Elections in the 1980s ===
General election 1987: Kingswood
Party	Candidate	Votes	%	±%
Conservative	Robert Hayward	26,300	44.9	+4.5
Labour	Roger Berry	21,907	37.4	+0.3
SDP	Pamela Whittle	10,382	17.7	–4.8
Majority		4,393	7.5	+4.3
Turnout		58,589	80.2	+2.6
Registered electors		73,089		+1.3
Conservative hold		Swing	+2.1	

General election 1983: Kingswood
Party	Candidate	Votes	%	±%
Conservative	Robert Hayward	22,573	40.4	–0.8
Labour	Terence Walker	20,776	37.1	–10.8
SDP	Martyn Gilbert	12,591	22.5	+12.6
Majority		1,797	3.3	N/A
Turnout		55,940	77.5	
Registered electors		72,159		
Conservative gain from Labour (Notional.)		Swing	+5.0	

1979 notional result
Party	Vote	%
Labour	27,592	47.9
Conservative	23,694	41.1
Liberal	5,728	9.9
Others	587	1.0
Turnout	57,601	
Electorate		

=== Elections in the 1970s ===
General election 1979: Kingswood
Party	Candidate	Votes	%	±%
Conservative	Jack Aspinwall	23,553	45.4	+6.8
Labour	Terence Walker	23,250	44.8	+0.8
Liberal	Anthony Wilson	4,852	9.3	–8.1
National Front	R Bale	258	0.5	New
Majority		303	0.6	N/A
Turnout		51,913	86.2	+2.0
Registered electors		60,229		+7.1
Conservative gain from Labour		Swing	+3.0	

General election October 1974: Kingswood
Party	Candidate	Votes	%	±%
Labour	Terence Walker	20,703	44.0	+5.3
Conservative	David Hunt	18,137	38.6	+3.3
Liberal	Jack Aspinwall	8,216	17.4	–8.5
Majority		2,566	5.4	+2.0
Turnout		47,056	84.2	–2.5
Registered electors		55,952		+0.9
Labour hold		Swing	+1.0	

General election February 1974: Kingswood
Party	Candidate	Votes	%	±%
Labour	Terence Walker	18,616	38.7	–8.4
Conservative	Charles Irving	16,975	35.3	–17.5
Liberal	Jack Aspinwall	12,471	25.9	New
Majority		1,641	3.4	N/a
Turnout		48,062	86.7	+12.7
Registered electors		55,462		+1.2
Labour gain from Conservative (Notional.)		Swing	+4.5	

1970 notional result
Party	Vote	%
Conservative	21,400	52.8
Labour	19,100	47.2
Turnout	40,500	73.9
Electorate	54,797	

== See also ==
- Parliamentary constituencies in Avon
