= Politicisation =

Political contestation of ideas, entities and facts

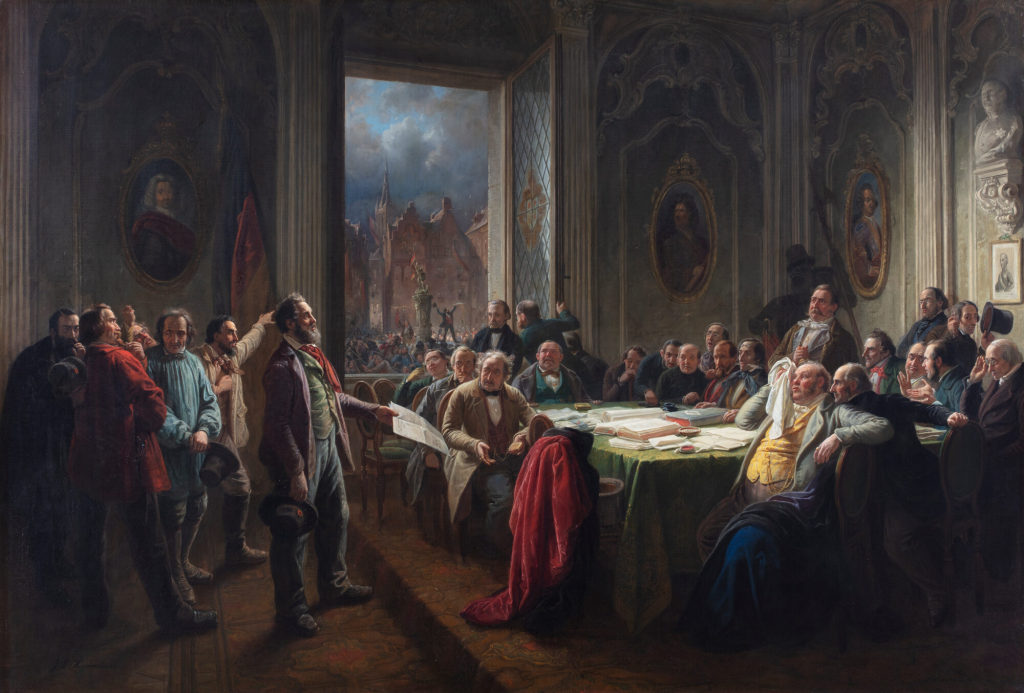
Johann Peter Hasenclever's painting, Workers confront Town Council (German: Arbeiter vor dem Magistrat)

Politicisation (also politicization; see English spelling differences) is a concept in political science and theory used to explain how ideas, entities or collections of facts are given a political tone or character, and are consequently assigned to the ideas and strategies of a particular group or party, thus becoming the subject of contestation. Politicisation has been described as compromising objectivity, and is linked with political polarisation. Conversely, it can have a democratising effect and enhance political choice, and has been shown to improve the responsiveness of supranational institutions such as the European Union. The politicisation of a group is more likely to occur when justifications for political violence are considered acceptable within a society, or in the absence of norms condemning violence.

Depoliticisation, the reverse process, is when issues are no longer the subject of political contestation. It is characterised by governance through consensus-building and pragmatic compromise. It occurs when subjects are left to experts, such as technocratic or bureaucratic institutions, or left to individuals and free markets, through liberalisation or deregulation. It is often connected with multi-level governance. The concept has been used to explain the "democratic gap" between politicians and citizens who lack choice, agency and opportunities for deliberation. In the 21st century, depoliticisation has been linked to disillusionment with neoliberalism. Depoliticisation has negative consequences for regime legitimacy, and produces anti-political sentiment associated with populism, which can result in "repoliticisation" (politicisation following depoliticisation).

Current studies of politicisation are separated into various subfields. It is primarily examined on three separate levels: within national political systems, within the European Union and within international institutions. Academic approaches vary greatly and are frequently disconnected. It has been studied from subdisciplines such as comparative politics, political sociology, European studies and legal theory.

The politicisation of science occurs when actors stress the inherent uncertainty of scientific method to challenge scientific consensus, undermining the positive impact of science on political debate by causing citizens to dismiss scientific evidence.

== Definitions ==
The dominant academic framework for understanding politicisation is the systems model, which sees politics as an arena or sphere. In this perspective, politicisation is the process by which issues or phenomena enter the sphere of "the political", a space of controversy and conflict. Alternatively, in the behaviouralist approach to political science, which sees politics as action or conflict, politicisation is conceptualised as the process by which an issue or phenomenon becomes significantly more visible in the collective consciousness, causing political mobilisation.

In the systems model, depoliticisation is seen as "arena-shifting": removing issues from the political sphere by placing them outside the direct control or influence of political institutions, such as legislatures and elected politicians, thereby denying or minimising their political nature. In the behaviouralist model, depoliticisation indicates the reduction of popular interest in an issue, a weakening of participation in the public sphere and the utilisation of power to prevent opposition.

== Theory ==
=== Comparative politics (national level) ===
Majoritarian and non-majoritarian institutions in Taiwan

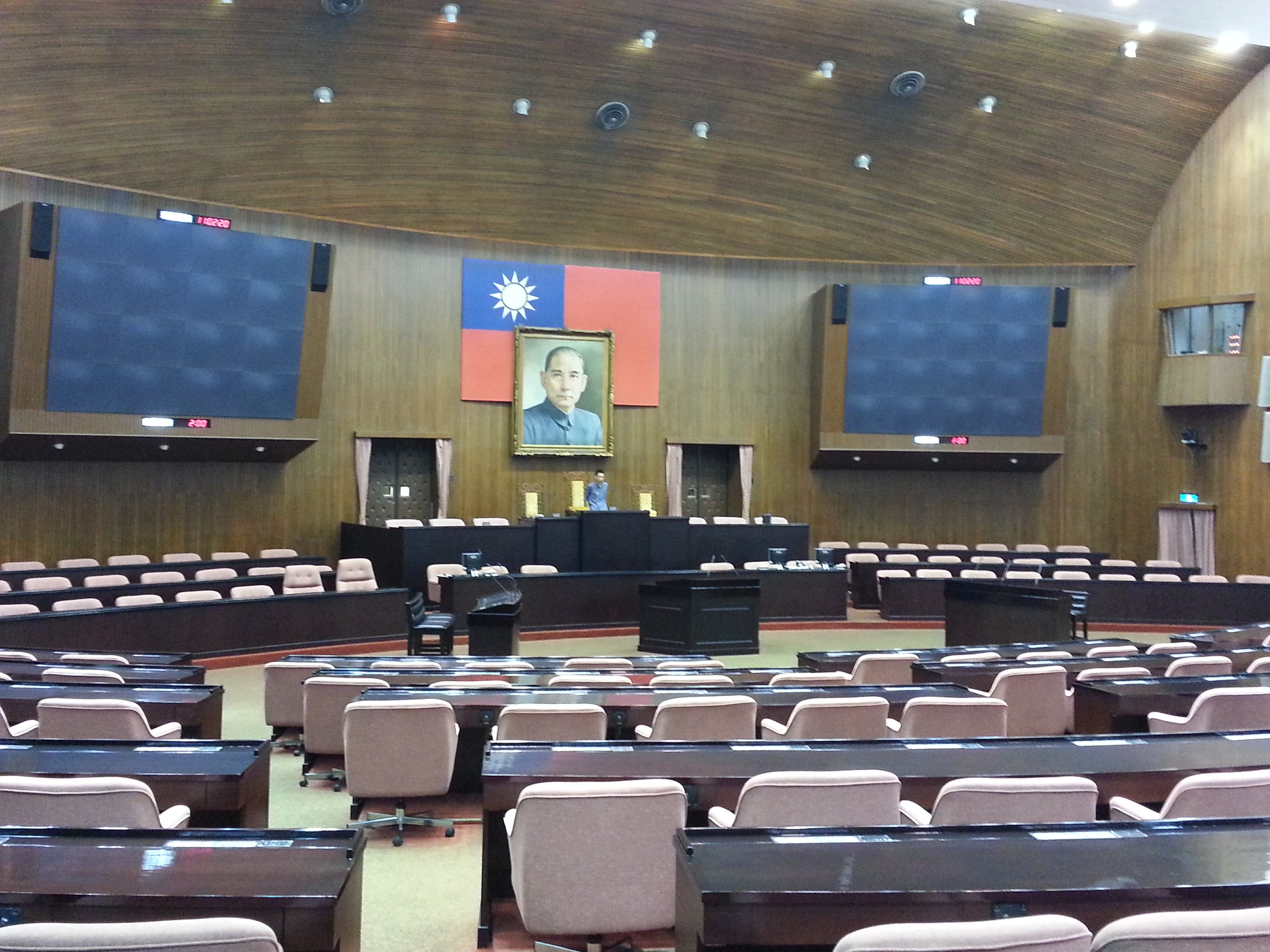
Members of the Legislative Yuan of the Republic of China are appointed through direct elections held every four years.

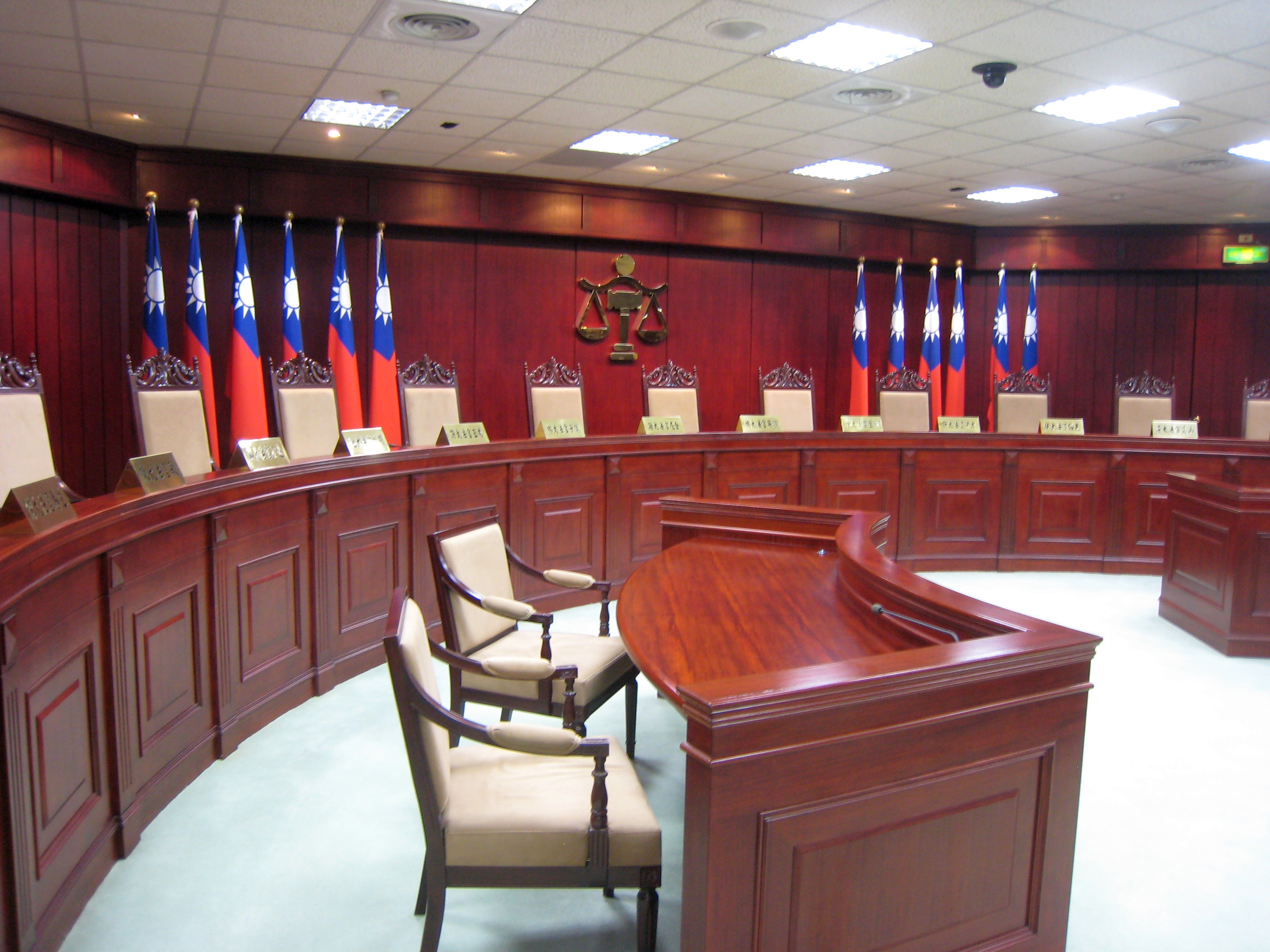
Constitutional Court judges are appointed for life and cannot be removed from office. Safeguards prevent political interference.

Majoritarian institutions, (Note: 'Majoritarian' is frequently used to describe plurality voting systems; Majoritarianism, referred to here in the context of majoritarian and non-majoritarian institutions, is the idea that an authority's legitimacy stems from the will of a numerical majority of those subject to it.) such as parliaments (legislatures) and political parties, are associated with politicisation because they represent popular sovereignty and their agents are subject to short-term political considerations, particularly the need to compete for votes ("vote-seeking") by utilising populist rhetoric and policies. Non-majoritarian institutions, such as constitutional courts, central banks and international organisations, are neither directly elected nor directly managed by elected officials, and are connected with depoliticisation as they tend towards moderation and compromise.

Declines in voter turnout, political mobilisation and political party membership, trends present in most OECD countries from the 1960s onwards, reflect depoliticisation. A number of causes for this shift have been suggested. The growth of big tent political parties (parties which aim to appeal to a broad spectrum of voters) resulted in reduced polarisation and centralised decision-making, with increased compromise and bargaining. In postwar Europe, the development of neo-corporatism led to political bargaining between powerful employers' organisations, trade unions and the government in a system known as tripartism, within which cartel parties could successfully prevent competition from newer parties. Globally during the late 20th century, central banks and constitutional courts became increasingly important.

Robert Dahl argued that these processes risked producing alienation because they created a professionalised form of politics that was "anti-ideological" and "too remote and bureaucratized". Other contemporary scholars saw depoliticisation as a positive indication of dealignment and democratic maturity, as political competition came to be dominated by issues rather than cleavages. In the early 21st century, theorists such as Colin Crouch and Chantal Mouffe argued that low participation was not the result of satisfaction with political systems, but the consequence of low confidence in institutions and political representatives; in 2007, Colin Hay explicitly linked these studies with the concept of politicisation.

Since the 1990s, a process of "repoliticisation" has occurred on the national level, marked by the growth of right-wing populist parties in Europe, increased polarisation in American politics and higher voter turnout. The divide between the winners and losers of globalisation and neoliberalism is hypothesised to have played a major role in this process, having replaced class conflict as the primary source of politicisation. Sources of conflict along this line include an "integration–demarcation" cleavage (between the losers of globalisation, who favour protectionism and nationalism, and the winners of globalisation, who prefer increased competition, open borders and internationalism); and a similar "cosmopolitan–communitarian" cleavage (which places additional emphasis on a cultural divide between supporters of universal norms and those who believe in cultural particularism).

Disillusionment with neoliberal policies has also been cited as a factor behind the processes of depoliticisation and repoliticisation, particularly through the lens of public choice theory. In 2001, Peter Burnham argued that in the UK the New Labour administration of Tony Blair used depoliticisation as a governing strategy, presenting contentious neoliberal reforms as non-negotiable "constraints" in order to lower political expectations, thus creating apathy and submission among the electorate and facilitating the emergence of "anti-politics".

Neo-Marxist, radical democratic and anti-capitalist critiques aim to repoliticise what they describe as neoliberal society, arguing that Marx's theory of alienation can be used to explain depoliticisation.

=== European studies (European Union) ===
In post-functionalist theory, the politicisation of the EU is seen as a threat to integration because it constrains executive decision makers in member states due to domestic partisanship, fear of referendum defeat and the electoral repercussions of European policies, ultimately preventing political compromise on the European level.

The EU has experienced politicisation over time however it has been at an increased rate since the early 2000's due to the series of crises. At a national level within its member states, a rise in populism has contributed to volatile party politics and the election of anti-EU representatives. Due to the EU's increasing involvement and influence in controversial policy issues as it strives for further integration, there is a rise in the contestational nature of interactions between EU agents. After dissatisfaction with governance, rising populist challengers have grown the cleavages in electoral divides.

== Politicisation of science ==
=== COVID-19 pandemic ===
During the COVID-19 pandemic, the politicisation of investigations into the origin of COVID-19 led to geopolitical tension between the United States and China, the growth of anti-Asian rhetoric and the bullying of scientists. Some scientists said that politicisation could obstruct global efforts to suppress the virus and prepare for future pandemics. Political scientists Giuliano Bobba and Nicolas Hubé have argued that the pandemic has strengthened populist politicians by providing an opportunity for them to promote policies such as tighter border controls, anti-elitism and restriction of public freedoms.

== See also ==
- Political polarisation – Divergence of political attitudes
- Post-politics – A result of depoliticisation
