= Economic rationalism =

Concept in macroeconomic policy in Australia

Economic rationalism is an Australian term often used in the discussion of macroeconomic policy, applicable to the economic policy of many governments around the world, in particular during the 1980s and 1990s. Economic rationalists tend to favour economically liberal policies: deregulation, a free market economy, privatisation of state-owned industries, lower direct taxation and higher indirect taxation, and globalization. The term is most frequently used to describe advocates of market-oriented reform within the Australian Labor Party, whose position was closer to what has become known as the "Third Way". More conservative equivalents include Rogernomics (NZ), Thatcherism (UK) and Reaganomics (US).

Given that it is a phrase used by the sociologist Max Weber in The Protestant Ethic and the Spirit of Capitalism, it is highly likely that the term was drawn from there and that its modern denotations can all be accommodated within Weber's usage. Its recent usage arose independently in Australia, and was derived from the phrase "economically rational", used as a favourable description of market-oriented economic policies. Its first appearances in print were in the early 1970s under the Whitlam government, and it was almost invariably used in a favourable sense until the late 1980s.

The now dominant negative use came into widespread use during the 1990 recession; it was popularised by Michael Pusey's best-selling book Economic Rationalism in Canberra.

== Criticism ==
The term "economic rationalism" is commonly used in criticism of free-market economic policies as amoral or asocial. In this context, it may be summarised as "the view that commercial activity... represents a sphere of activity in which moral considerations, beyond the rule of business probity dictated by enlightened self-interest, have no role to play" (Quiggin 1997).

The well-known statement of Margaret Thatcher, "There is no such thing as society. There are individuals, and there are families," is often quoted in that context, but the interpretation of that statement is disputed.

== Support ==
Supporters of economic rationalism have presented two kinds of responses to criticisms such as those quoted above. Some have denied that such criticisms are accurate and claim that the term refers only to rational policy formulation based on sound economic analysis, and it does not preclude government intervention aimed at income redistribution, correcting market failure, etc.

Others have accepted the accuracy of the description but have argued that the adoption of radical free-market policies is both inevitable and desirable. Another statement by Thatcher, "there is no alternative", is frequently cited in that context.

== See also ==
- Blairism
- Bob Hawke
- Hawke government
- Paul Keating
- Keating government
