= Young Fabians Health Network =

UK special interest group

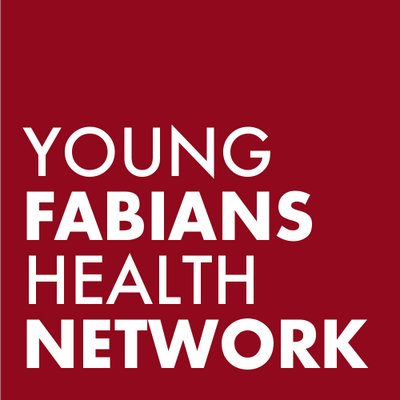
- Formation: 2011
- Type: Think Tank subgroup
- Purpose: Health Special Interest Group and Outreach Network of the Young Fabians
- Headquarters: London, United Kingdom
- Location: Petty France, London, SW1
- Members: 70
- Chair: Milo Barnett
- Founder: Martin Edobor
- Main organ: Steering Committee
- Parent organization: Young Fabians
- Affiliations: Labour Party
- Website: http://www.youngfabians.org.uk/

The Young Fabians Health Network is a special interest group of the youth section of the Fabian Society.

== About ==
The aim of the Young Fabians Health Network is to connect professionals, academics and policy makers in the health and social care sectors. Providing a forum for policy orientated debate and discussion feeding into wider Young Fabian thinking.

The network organises an annual programme of policy round-tables, publications, panel events involving public figures from the world of health and social care.

== History ==
The Young Fabian Health Network was formed in November 2011 founded by Dr Martin Edobor. In February 2012 the Health Network was officially launched by former Young Fabian Chair, Sara Ibrahim with a keynote address from Maureen Donnelly former chair of Cambridgeshire primary care trust at University College London.

In 2012 the Network held a series of policy roundtables examining the funding mechanisms for health and social care. In May that year Andy Burnham MP, Shadow Secretary of State of Health, set out Labour’s vision for a sustainable social care system at the Health Network's flagship policy event. The policy series culminated in the publication of Young Fabian 61 policy pamphlet "Irreversible? Health and social care policy in a post-coalition Landscape", edited by Martin Edobor and Daniel Wilson-Craw examining the way a 'whole person care' approach could be used to tackle the health and social care crisis.

Ade Adeyemi chaired the Health Network from 2012–2013, where he led a policy series looking at the use of data within the NHS. In June 2013 the Health Network entered a formal partnership with AMREF, Africa’s leading health charity with the aim of long term collaboration to provide policy-based solutions to healthcare problems in Africa.

The Network was recently chaired by Amrita Rose (2013-2014), she worked with the steering committee on a series of events examining how Labour can develop a sustainable health policy platform for Britain. Sonia Adesara chaired the Network from 2017-2019. The current Chair is Milo Barnett.

== Chairs ==
Chairs of Young Fabians Health Network are elected at an annual AGM and hold office for one year.

Health Network Chairs
Year	Health Network
2011–2012	Martin Edobor
2012–2013	Adebusuyi Adeyemi
2013–2014	Amrita Rose
2014–2015	Sophie Keenleyside
2015-2016	Rose Gray
2017-2018	Sonia Adesara
2018-2019	Sonia Adesara
2019-2020	Victoria Gilbert and Morenike Adeleke
2020-2021	Milo Barnett

== Young Fabian Press ==
- Anticipations – Print magazine of the Young Fabians
- Anatomy – Policy project-centric serial

== See also ==
- List of UK think tanks
