= Post-democracy =

State operating with formal but co-opted democratic systems

The term post-democracy is a term coined by Warwick University political scientist Colin Crouch in 2000 in his book Coping with Post-Democracy. It designates states that operate by democratic systems (elections are held, governments fall, and there is freedom of speech), but whose application is progressively limited. That is, a small elite co-opts democratic institutions to give itself decision-making authority. Crouch further developed the idea in an article called, "Is there a liberalism beyond social democracy?" for the think tank Policy Network and in his subsequent book The Strange Non-Death of Neo-Liberalism.

The term may also denote a general conception of a post-democratic system that may involve other structures of group decision-making and governance than the ones found in contemporary or historical democracy.

== Definition ==
By Crouch's definition:

"A post-democratic society is one that continues to have and to use all the institutions of democracy, but in which they increasingly become a formal shell. The energy and innovative drive pass away from the democratic arena and into small circles of a politico-economic elite."

Crouch states that we are not "living in a post-democratic society, but that we were moving towards such a condition".

== Causes ==
Crouch names the following reasons:

- No common goals: For people in the post-industrial society it is increasingly difficult, in particular for the underclass, to identify themselves as a group and therefore difficult to focus on political parties that represent them. For instance laborers, farmers or entrepreneurs no longer feel attracted to one political movement and this means that there is no common goal for them as a group to get united.
- Globalization: The effect of globalization makes it almost impossible for nations to work out their own economic policy. Therefore, large trade agreements and supranational unions (e.g., the European Union) are used to make policy but this level of politics is very hard to control with democratic instruments. Globalization additionally endows transnational corporations with more political leverage given their ability to avoid federal regulation and directly affect domestic economies.
- Non-balanced debates: In most democratic countries the positions of the political parties have become very much alike. This means that there is not much to choose from for its voters. The effect is that political campaigns are looking more like advertising to make the differences look bigger. Also the private lives of the politicians have become an important item in elections. Sometimes "sensitive" issues stay undiscussed. The English conservative journalist Peter Oborne presented a documentary of the 2005 general election, arguing that it had become anti-democratic because it targeted a number of floating voters with a narrow agenda.
- Entanglement between public and private sector: There are large shared interests between politics and business. Through lobbying companies, multinational corporations are able to bring about legislation more effectively than the inhabitants of a country. Corporations and governments are in close relation because states need corporations as they are great employers. But as much of the production is outsourced, and corporations have almost no difficulty in moving to other countries, labor law becomes employee-unfriendly and tax bites are moved from companies to individuals. It becomes more common for politicians and managers to switch jobs (the 'revolving door').
- Privatization: Then there is the neoliberal idea of new public management (neoliberalism) of privatizing public services. Privatized institutions are difficult to control by democratic means and have no allegiance to human communities, unlike government. Crouch uses the term "phantom firms" to describe the flexibility and elusive nature of firms which bend to the market. He concludes that private firms have incentive to make individual profit rather than better the welfare of the public. For example, he states that there is a problem with pharmaceutical companies funding (and skewing) medical research.

== Solutions ==
According to Crouch there is an important task for social media in which voters can participate more actively in public debates. In addition, these voters would have to join advocacy groups for specific interests. The citizens have to reclaim their place in decision making. He calls this post-post-democracy. Crouch argues that some forms of populism or direct voice of the people might invigorate democracy, but "there must always be another election, and opposition and government parties alike must have the right to go on debating and using political resources in preparation for that moment".

== See also ==
- Democracy: The God That Failed—2001 book by Hans-Hermann Hoppe
- Democratic deficit – When an institution falls short of upholding the people's power in and over itself
- Inverted totalitarianism – Political theory about illiberal democracies
- Iron law of oligarchy – Political theory developed by Robert Michels
- Neonormalization – Period of Czechoslovak history
- Post-politics – Critique of post-Cold War politics of consensus
- Policy Network – International think tank
- Post-capitalism – State whose economic system is no longer a form of capitalism
- Whole-process people's democracy – Chinese Communist Party concept

== Sources ==
- Interview with Colin Crouch about post-democracy on YouTube (mainly in English)

Verma, Ravindra Kumar "Indian Politics: Haunted by Spectre of Post Democracy?", Indian Journal of Public Administration/SAGE, 63(4), December 2017
