= Nicholas Bosanquet =

British health economist (1942–2026)

Nicholas Bosanquet (17 January 1942 – 3 April 2026) was a British health economist and political activist.

== Life and career ==
Bosanquet was born on 17 January 1942. He was educated at Winchester College, then studied history at Clare College, Cambridge. He attended Yale University as a Mellon Fellow, and returned to England to study economics at the London School of Economics (LSE), before he became an economic advisor to the National Board of Prices and Incomes. From 1969, Bosanquet lectured in economics at the LSE. Focusing on health economics, he was at the King's Fund College from 1973 until 1986, then moved to the University of York, before becoming a professor at the University of London. From 1993 to 2022, Bosanquet was Professor of Health Policy at Imperial College London.

He served on the executive of the Fabian Society from 1968 until 1977. He chaired the Young Fabians in 1968–69, and was chair of the Fabian Society in 1974–75. He stood for the Labour Party in the 1969 Weston-super-Mare by-election, taking third place, with 14.6% of the vote.

In 1971, Bosanquet was unsuccessful in standing to be a Labour councillor for the Adelaide ward on Camden Council. He stood in 1974 and was elected, as Labour councillor, for the Camden ward, and was re-elected in 1978 for the Caversham ward. In 1982 he stood again, unsuccessfully, for the same ward, this time for the Social Democratic Party (SDP), having joined the party in 1981. Bosanquet stood for the SDP in Slough at the 1983 UK general election, and in Stockton North at the 1987 UK general election. He also served on the party's housing and urban policy working parties.

Bosanquet also served as an advisor to the World Health Organization and to the World Bank, as a special advisor to the Health Committee of the House of Commons, and as an arbitrator for ACAS. In addition to works on health economics, he authored Our Land at War: Britain's key First World War sites.

He married Anne Connolly in 1974, and they had two daughters; the pair divorced in 1993. In 1996, he married Anna Zarzecka; they divorced in 2016. Bosanquet lived in York and stated his recreations as "visiting battlefields, brainstorming with Americans and others about military history". Bosanquet died from complications of a stroke on 3 April 2026, aged 84.

Party political offices
Preceded by Frank Judd	Chair of the Fabian Society; 1974–1975	Succeeded by Colin Crouch
