= There is no alternative =

Political slogan

A 1994 Christian Democratic Union poster with the slogan Es gibt keine Alternative ("There is no alternative")

"There is no alternative" (TINA) is a political slogan originally arguing that liberal capitalism is the only viable system. At the turn of the 21st century, the slogan became closely tied to neoliberalism. Politicians used it to argue for economically liberal and fiscally conservative policies, as well as austerity. The slogan is strongly associated with the policies and persona of Margaret Thatcher, the British prime minister and leader of the Conservative Party during the 1980s. It is also associated, in the form alternativlos (lit. 'alternativeless'), with Angela Merkel, who served as Chancellor of Germany from 2005 until 2021.

Researchers of populism generally agree that the slogan's growth in popularity since the 1990s is the result of political elites accepting certain concepts, such as the free market, as unalterable truths and the associated disappearance of political discord (so-called post-politics). This created a virtual "party cartel", where the views of established parties do not differ on policies. A rise in dissatisfaction with these policies coupled with a lack of opposition to them by mainstream parties has led to the rise of new populist parties, such as Alternative for Germany and Viktor Orbán's post-2016 version of Fidesz in Hungary.

== As a political strategy ==
TINA (as characterized by explicit use of "there is no alternative" and declarations of necessity, inevitability, and irrefutability of certain policies) can be considered a political strategy in both democratic and autocratic regimes. Its rhetoric allows politicians to reduce the scope of available policy choices, limiting the expectations of their electorate and avoiding the blame for bad, but "unescapable" policies.

TINA allows decisions to appear not as a political choice, but as a matter of adherence to universal truth and common sense. Due to the switch from public deliberations to following the expert opinions, debates are shortened, and therefore input of an individual voter is diminished, so TINA is politically paternalistic.

On the negative side, applying TINA might create an impression of politicians' toothlessness, prompting voters to try addressing their grievances outside of the establishment which appears to be not in control and being a hostage to external factors and "disciplinary regimes" of either IMF and World Bank (with their Washington Consensus), or EU Commission.

== History ==
=== 1980s ===
In a speech to the Conservative Women's Conference on 21 May 1980, Margaret Thatcher appealed to the notion saying, "We have to get our production and our earnings into balance. There's no easy popularity in what we are proposing but it is fundamentally sound. Yet I believe people accept there's no real alternative." Later in the speech, she returned to the theme: "What's the alternative? To go on as we were before? All that leads to is higher spending. And that means more taxes, more borrowing, higher interest rates, more inflation, more unemployment."

The phrase is used to signify Thatcher's claim that the market economy is the best, right and only system that works, and that debate about this is over. One critic characterized the meaning of the slogan as: "Globalised capitalism, so called free markets and free trade were the best ways to build wealth, distribute services and grow a society's economy. Deregulation's good, if not God." By contrast, Thatcher described her support of markets as flowing from a more basic moral argument; specifically, she argued that the market-principle of choice flows from the moral principle that for human behavior to be moral requires free choice by people.

Astrid Séville notes the curious mix of Thatcher's use of neoliberal rhetoric of individual empowerment and the paternalistic tilt of TINA. Although Thatcher became – and remained for many years – a deeply polarizing politician, her legacy in Great Britain carried through both Third Way and New Labour periods, starting a "TINA era".

=== 2010s ===
Angela Merkel's use of the term alternativlos (literally "alternative-less"; without alternative) in relation to her responses to the European sovereign-debt crisis in 2010 led to the term becoming "un-word of the year".

In 2013, Prime Minister David Cameron resurrected the phrase, stating "If there was another way I would take it. But there is no alternative"—referring to austerity in the United Kingdom. Christine Lagarde, then Managing Director of the IMF, declared in May 2013 that "there is no alternative to austerity", seconded by France's Prime Minister Jean-Marc Ayrault in French: Il n’y a pas d’alternative à la politique menée.

The crisis had exposed a rift between the euro rescue packages and political realities: in 12 out of 15 cases the governments that implemented austerity measures were voted out, Eurosceptic and populist parties enjoyed a quick boost in popularity. In response, Eurozone turned to the "federalism of executive bodies", pushing the decision authority up to the European Commission, forming diverse coalitions united mostly by the pro-Euro stance of parties, squashing referendum proposals. TINA rhetoric was used as a "shielding mechanism" to depoliticize the discourse. However, in Germany, many voters ended up fleeing to Alternative for Germany in an attempt to re-politicize the euro area crisis.

== Criticism ==
Opponents of TINA policies used the phrase in a derisory manner. For instance, cabinet minister Norman St John-Stevas, one of the leading "wets", nicknamed Thatcher "Tina", after the acronym TINA. The critic of globalization Susan George coined the opposing slogan "another world is possible" in 2001.

== See also ==
- Thatcherism
- Capitalist Realism: Is There No Alternative?
- HyperNormalisation
- Market fundamentalism
- Overton window
- Pensée unique
- Post-capitalism

== Sources ==
- Berbuir, Nicole; Lewandowsky, Marcel; Siri, Jasmin (3 April 2015). "The AfD and its Sympathisers: Finally a Right-Wing Populist Movement in Germany?". German Politics. 24 (2): 154–178. doi:10.1080/09644008.2014.982546. ISSN 0964-4008.
- van Eeden, Pepijn (2019). "Discover, Instrumentalize, Monopolize: Fidesz's Three-Step Blueprint for a Populist Take-over of Referendums". East European Politics and Societies: And Cultures. 33 (3): 705–732. doi:10.1177/0888325418800548. ISSN 0888-3254.
- Séville, Astrid (2017). "From 'one right way' to 'one ruinous way'? Discursive shifts in 'There is no alternative'". European Political Science Review. 9 (3): 449–470. doi:10.1017/S1755773916000035. ISSN 1755-7739.
