= Tom Happold =

Thomas Edmund Happold was Head of Multimedia of Guardian News Media. He previously worked on the BBC Ten O'clock News and Channel 4 News. He was previously Deputy Editor of Comment is free.

Since 2013 Happold has run Happen Digital, a digital production and consultancy company. As of 2015 he is also Executive Editor of the LabourList blog, and was chair of the Young Fabians during the 1990s.
