= Sonia Adesara =

Medical doctor, activist

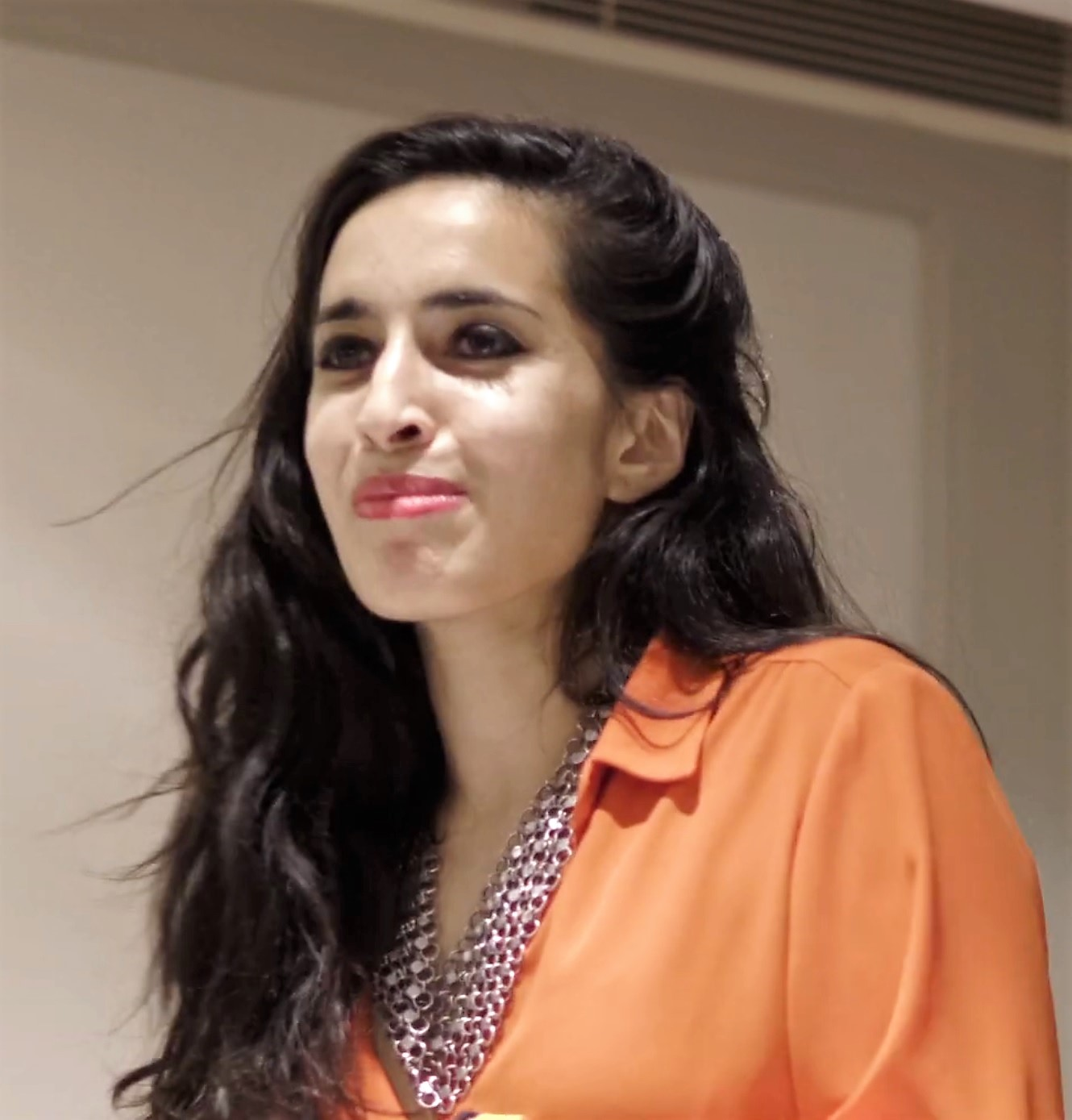
- Adesara at UK Labour Party conference in 2019
- Born: 1990 (age 35–36)
- Education: University of Nottingham
- Known for: Campaigner
- Awards: Asian Woman of Achievement (2019); Marie Claire Future Shaper (2019)
- Website: www.soniaadesara.com

Sonia Adesara (born 1990) is a British medical doctor and activist who specialises in reproductive health. She is campaigner for migrants rights and gender equality. She co-chairs the Young Medical Women International Association, and sits on the Central Council of the Socialist Health Association.

== Early life and education ==
Adesara is the daughter of an Asian-Ugandan refugee. She studied medicine at the University of Nottingham.

== Career ==
Adesara is a medical doctor. She is co-Chair of the Young Medical Women International Association, and a National Medical Director's Clinical Fellow at Macmillan. She was a member of the Keep Our NHS Public campaign in July 2019. She has written about the rise in anti-abortion rhetoric in light of the Brexit vote and election of Donald Trump. Adesara is a member of the 50:50 Parliament campaign, which looks to increase women's representation in the Palace of Westminster. She has previously chaired the Young Fabians Health Network. She is a member of the Fabian Society's executive committee.

Throughout the COVID-19 pandemic, Adesara worked as a doctor in central London. She used social media to communicate public health advice as well as sharing her concerns about the deteriorating conditions in hospitals.

== Awards and honours ==
She was featured in the Stylist magazine as a Woman of the Week in 2018 and selected as a Marie Claire Future Shaper in 2019. In 2019 she was awarded the Asian Women of Achievement Young Achiever award.
