= Pensée unique =

Pejorative term for ideological conformism

"Pensée unique" (French pronunciation: [pɑ̃se ynik]；French for 'single thought') is a pejorative expression for perceived ideological conformism or consensus, particularly when the speaker considers alternative views to be excluded from mainstream debate. The expression implies that public debate is constrained by prevailing ideological assumptions about what is possible or legitimate. Originating in France, it came to be used in particular to criticise the perceived dominance of neoliberalism and the assumption that market-oriented policies were the only viable approach to organising society.

== History ==
The invention of the term pensée unique is generally attributed to journalist Jean-François Kahn, who used the expression in L'Événement du jeudi in 1990. He later popularised it during the 1994 presidential contest between Jacques Chirac and Édouard Balladur and his 1995 book La pensée unique. French political theorist Alain de Benoist also used the expression in 1993 to criticise the post-Cold War consensus in western democracies. An editorial published in January 1995 by Ignacio Ramonet in Le Monde diplomatique also participated in popularising the term, where he used it to criticise the ideological dominance of international capitalism.

The expression reached its peak in France during the 1995 presidential election and the strikes of November and December 1995. It became closely associated with opposition to the Maastricht Treaty, neoliberal economic policies, and the belief that there was "no alternative" to market-oriented policies. The concept was later adopted by political actors across the ideological spectrum and extended to increasingly broad contexts, contributing to the gradual dilution of its original meaning.

The term has also been used regarding prohibitionism of marijuana, with some commenters saying that pensée unique is a barrier to legalization.

== See also ==
- Conventional wisdom
- There is no alternative (TINA)
