= Young Fabians Economy and Finance Network =

UK special interest group

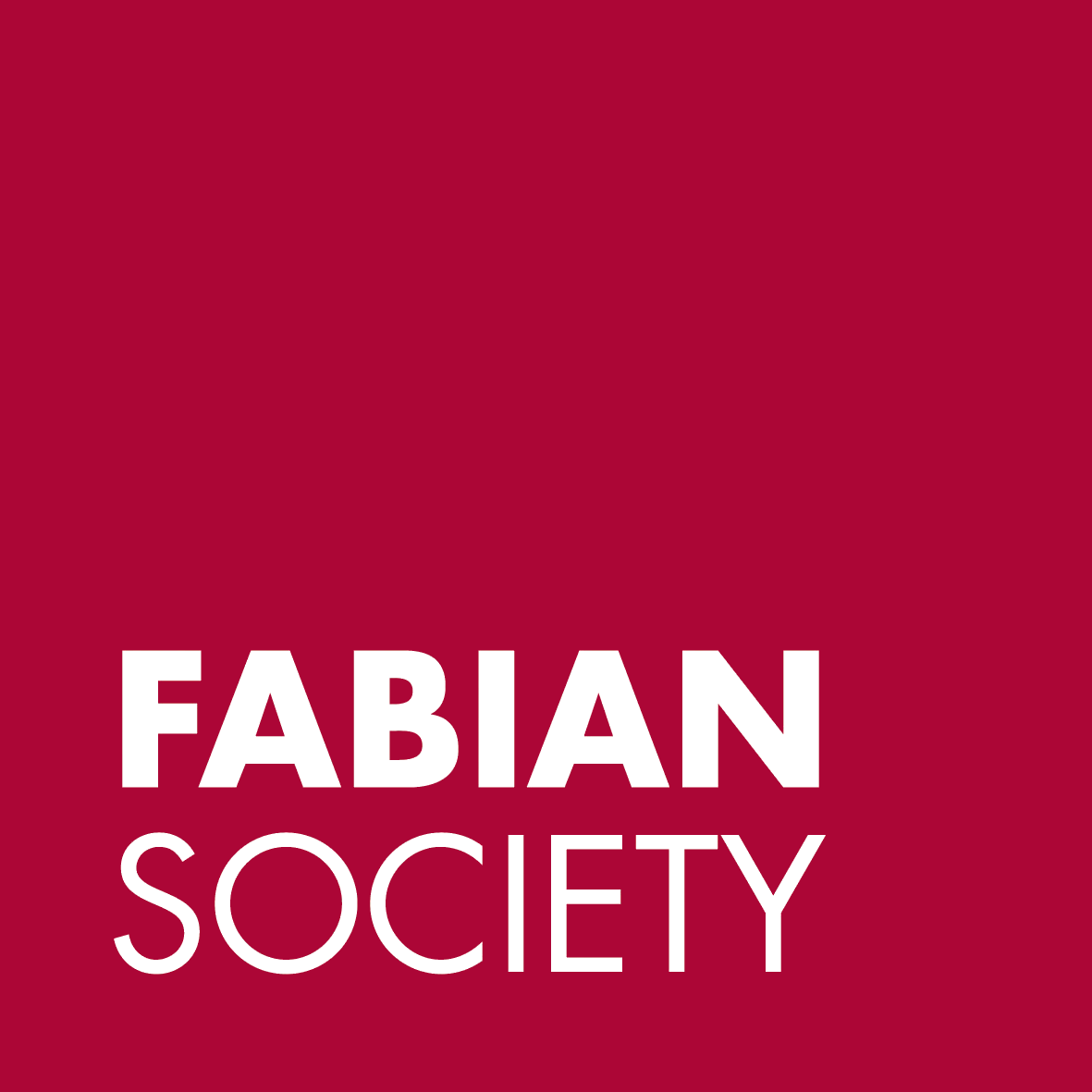
- Formation: 2010; 16 years ago
- Type: Think Tank subgroup
- Headquarters: London, United Kingdom
- Members: 378 (2020)
- Chair: Connor Escudero
- Vice-chair: Lauma Kalns-Timans
- Main organ: Steering Committee
- Parent organization: Young Fabians
- Affiliations: Labour Party (UK)
- Website: www.youngfabians.org.uk
- Formerly called: Future of Finance Network

The Young Fabians Economy and Finance Network is a British special interest group of the youth section of the Fabian Society, the UK's leading centre-left think tank.

The network originated as a grouping of finance professionals within the Young Fabians. It evolved to provide a general forum for progressives that have an interest in finance and economics. The network developed the first Young Fabians issue-specific journal Anatomy and has done work on UK Government budgets, reforms of the banking sector, housing, alternative financial services and youth financial education.

The network organises an annual programme of policy round-tables, publications, and panel events involving public figures from the worlds of finance, industry, public policy and economic thought.

== Chairs ==
Chairs of Young Fabians Finance Network are elected at an annual AGM's and hold office for one year.

Finance Network Chairs
Year	Finance Network
2023-	Connor Escudero
2021-2023	Dominic Shaw
2020-2021	Amarvir Singh-Bal & Chris Wongsosaputro
2019-2020	Marion Mayer
2018-2019	Jeevun Sandher & Alex Georgiou
2017-2018	Mark Whittaker
2016-2017	Ben West
2015-2016	Vickram Grewal
2014-2015	Joshua Price
2013-2014	Sophie Robson
2012-2013	Lorna Russell

== See also ==
- Fabian strategy
- Gradualism
- Keir Hardie
- Labour Research Department
- List of UK think tanks
- Reformism
- Social democracy
- Fabian Society
- Democratic socialism
- Ethical movement

== Young Fabian Press ==
- Anticipations – Print magazine of the Young Fabians
- Anatomy – Policy project-centric serial
