= Sara Ibrahim =

Former Chair of the Young Fabians, Barrister & British Labour Party activist

Vice-Chair of Fabian Society
- Incumbent
- Assumed office November 2015
- Preceded by: Steve Race

Chair of Young Fabians
- In office Nov 2011 – Nov 2012
- Preceded by: Adrian Prandle
- Succeeded by: Steve Race

Personal details
- Born: 8 May 1983 (age 43)
- Party: Labour
- Education: University of Cambridge
- Occupation: former Chair of the Young Fabians (2011–2012), British Labour Party activist, barrister specialising in employment law and equalities issues and legal journalist
- Website: www.saraibrahim.com

Sara Ibrahim (born 8 May 1983) is a former Chair of the Young Fabians (2011–2012), British Labour Party activist, barrister specialising in employment law and equalities issues and legal journalist. She is a founder member of Bar Standards Board Race Equality Taskforce.

== Early life and education ==
Ibrahim was born on 8 Mary 1983. She achieved a Bachelor of Arts in History at Fitzwilliam College, University of Cambridge.

== Young Fabians ==
Ibrahim was a member of the Young Fabians Executive for five consecutive terms 2008-2012 and held roles including Vice Chair in 2010/11. In 2011 she was elected National Chair of the Young Fabians.

As Chair, Ibrahim oversaw the expansion of the Young Fabian Networks, with the formation of the Health Network which in November 2011 published the Young Fabian Pamphlet, Ambitions for Britain's Future. She is a member of the Fabian Society Executive, first elected in November 2012 and served as Vice-Chair of the Fabian Society. Ibrahim has spoken at Young Fabians events such as the "Women in Leadership: Barriers to the Bar" event in April 2016.

== Legal career ==
Ibrahim was called to the Bar at Lincoln's Inn in October 2006. She was employed as a barrister working for 3 Hare Court.

In March 2015, Ibrahim was appointed to the C Panel of counsel serving the Equality and Human Rights Commission. She is a founder member of Bar Standards Board Race Equality Taskforce.

As of 2025, she works as a barrister for Gatehouse Chambers and is a member of the Employment Lawyers Association UK. Ibrahim is due to appear in the Privy Council in June 2025.

== Journalism ==
In 2017, Ibrahim wrote about the Labour response to the Westminster sex scandal for LabourList. Ibrahim has also written articles for Counsel Magazine, covering topics including anti-racism in the legal profession, the possibilities of regulating artificial intelligence (AI), and AI risks such as discriminatory algorithms and data privacy.

In 2021, she wrote about menopause in the workplace and the European Court of Justice (ECJ) judgment about two German women asked not to wear a hijab at work, both for the International Employment Lawyer (IEL) website.

In June 2023, she was interviewed for an episode of the Fox & Partners’ podcast series, covering the legal and practical implications of Chat GPT in the workplace. She has also spoken on the Get Legally Speaking podcast with Hatti Suvari.

Party political offices
Preceded by Steve Race	Vice-Chair of the Fabian Society; 2015 – present	Succeeded by Incumbent
Preceded by Adrian Prandle	Chair of the Young Fabians; 2010 – 2011	Succeeded by Steve Race
