= Young Fabians =

Political society in the United Kingdom

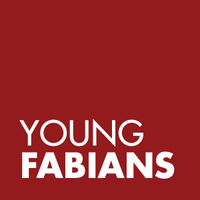
- Co-Chairs: Kasia Kramer; Yusuf Amin
- Vice Chair: Cai Parry
- Secretary: Lucas Irwin
- Treasurer: Katie Heggs
- Women's Officer: Lauren Griffith-Singelton
- Founded: 1960; 66 years ago
- Headquarters: Fabian Society, 61 Petty France, Westminster, London SW1H 9EU
- Membership: 2,000
- Type: Think tank
- Purpose: The 18–27 section of the Fabian Society

Website
- www.youngfabians.org.uk

The Young Fabians is a section of the Fabian Society for members aged 18–27, a socialist society in the United Kingdom that is affiliated with the Labour Party (UK). The Young Fabians, currently co-chaired by Kasia Kramer and Yusuf Amin, operate as a membership-driven think tank that organises policy debates, research projects, publications, conferences, and international delegations. The organisation holds no collective position on policy.

== History ==
The Fabian Society was founded by a group of young idealists in the late 19th century. For example, H. G. Wells was 27 when he joined the committee as was George Bernard Shaw. However, by the middle of the 20th century, the average age of active members was relatively elderly. To encourage more young people to join the society, a Young Fabian Group was proposed.

The Young Fabian Group for members of the Fabian society 30 years of age or younger was officially convened in May 1960 at a meeting organised by Fabian Society assistant General Secretary, Richard Leonard.

From small beginnings, the Young Fabians produced a steady stream of pamphlets through the 1960s and 1970s, and produced some 50 by 1980.

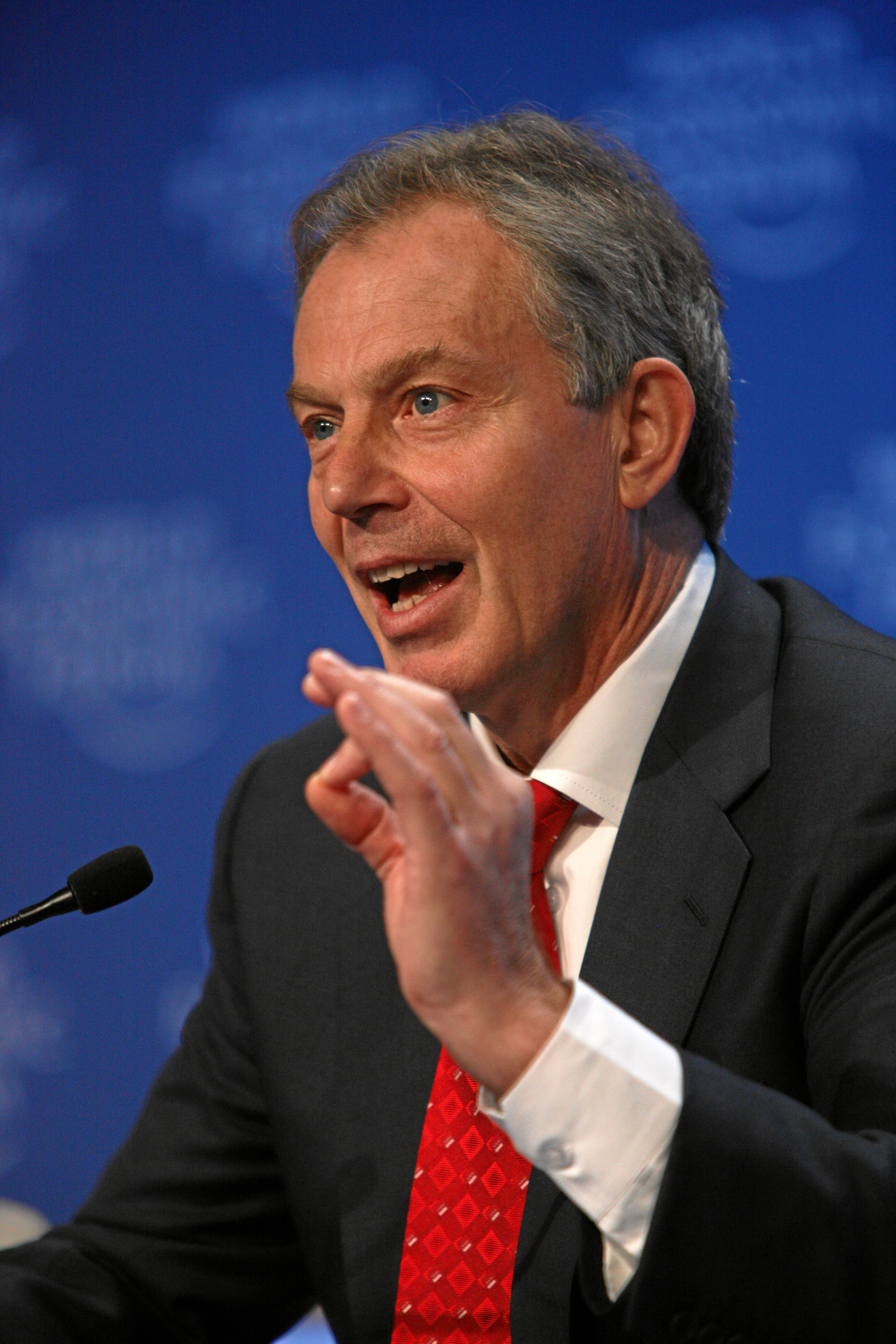
Tony Blair at the annual meeting of the World Economic Forum in Davos, Switzerland, 29 January 2009

The Young Fabians became less prominent during the 1980s while the Labour Party re-organised its youth wing, partly based on a template set out in a Young Fabian pamphlet. However, in the early 1990s, the group underwent a revival and played an important role in the discussion of the next stage of modernisation within the Labour Party. In 1994, members of the Young Fabians were part of the campaign to elect Tony Blair leader of the party and then the campaign to change Clause IV, although the group itself took no formal position on these issues.

In recent years, several controversial pamphlets have been produced including "Students as Citizens" which advocated granting more choice to university students and "The Case for Socialism" which set out the socialist themes and actions of the Government of Tony Blair. In 2014, pamphlet number 63 "One Nation" was launched, which examined Ed Miliband's vision for Britain. The most recent pamphlet, number 65 "Closing the Gap", explores how the Labour Party can remould the NHS to ensure it is fit to face the new challenges of an ageing population.

The Group's quarterly magazine Anticipations, named after the title of an essay by H. G. Wells, was founded in 1996. It was originally edited by Liam Byrne, Tom Happold, Mark Leonard and Emma Beswick.

Until 2015 the organisation's activities were run directly by its executive committee, which undertook a programme of speaker events, seminars, receptions and policy pamphlets. This was changed fundamentally with the adoption of a new constitution in 2015 after a campaign led by A. Adranghi and Martin Edobor with the document drafted by A. Adranghi and Luke John Davies. Since then, the focus of running programmes have been devolved to members as a whole, notably through member-led networks centered around topics related to core issues like International Affairs, Health and Education. The steering groups of each network are elected annually by the membership at a special Network AGM at the start of each calendar year.

The Young Fabians are currently affiliated as a full member of the Young European Socialists (YES).

In 2023 all Young Fabians had face-to-face activities, including the annual general meeting, were suspended and the executive committee largely suspended by the Fabian Society following its non-public review of culture and practice. In 2024, Young Fabians was relaunched with under-18s barred from membership, and the upper age limit reduced from 30 to 27. Young Fabians will also be led by two co-chairs, at least one being a women, with member complaints directly handled by the Fabian Society.

== Political position ==
The Young Fabians' statement of purpose is to avoid commitment to any one brand of socialism and to provide a "forum for different points of view within the left".

Unlike other youth socialist groups, the Young Fabians has maintained this position of neutrality on policy issues, upholding the Fabian Society's principle that its role is merely to determine whether a matter or position is suitable for discussion, not to take a group position on an issue. This has helped the group survive through many changes in the Labour Party without being identified as part of the left or right wing factions.

Along with the Fabian Society, the Young Fabians is affiliated with the Labour Party. The group officially maintain a policy of neutrality with decisions internal the Labour Party such as internal elections. The group has the right to appoint one member to the executive committee of Young Labour.

Full members of the group must not be members of political parties that oppose Labour. A significant minority of members do not hold membership of the Labour Party. Members of other political parties are able to join the group as associate members.

== The importance of the Young Fabians ==
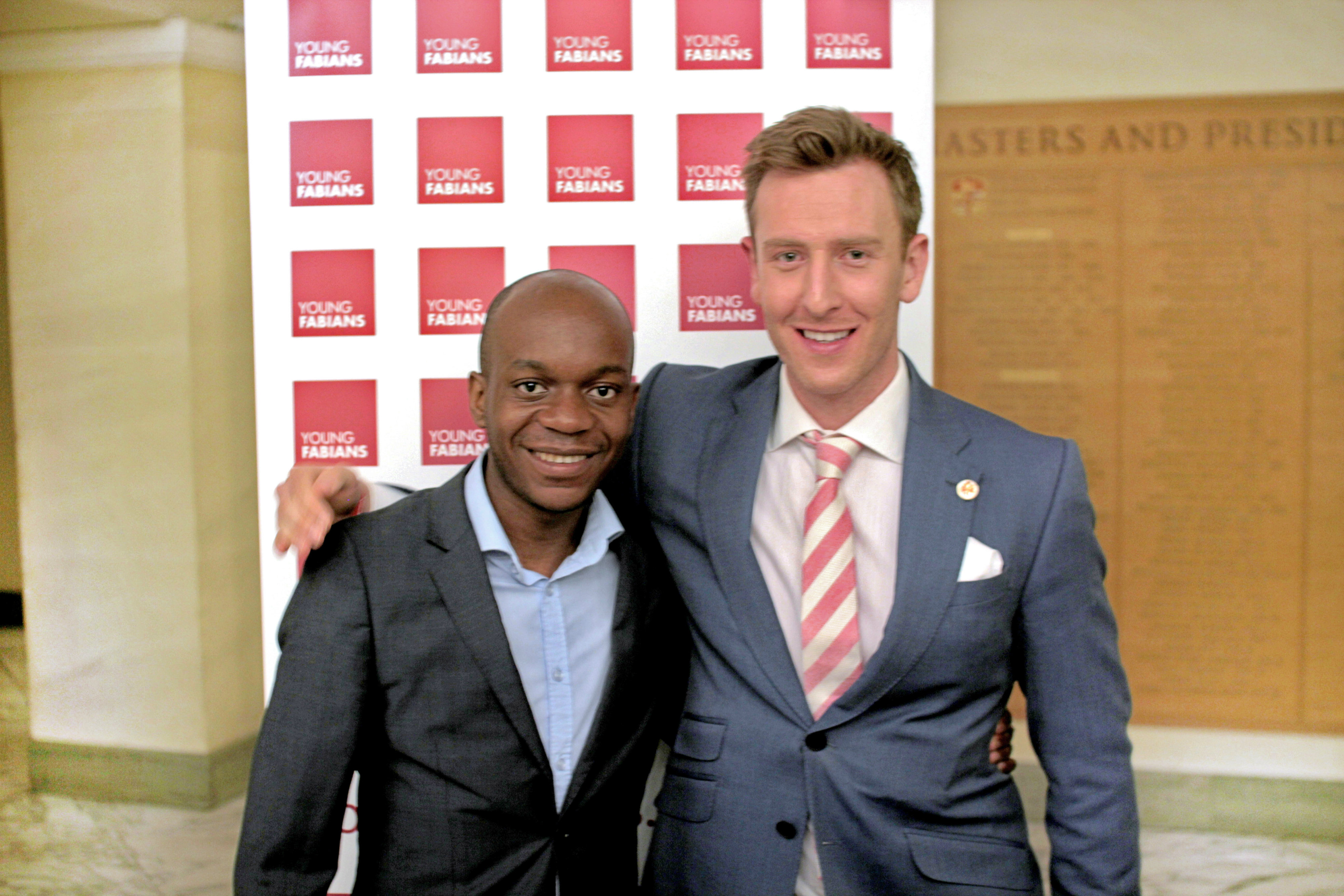
Former Young Fabian Chairs James Hallwood and Martin Edobor at Fabian Society Summer Conference 2015

The book The Modernisers' Dilemma cites the Young Fabians as one of the most important groups within the Labour Party. As an organised network of younger, generally well-educated party members, often researchers or academics, the Young Fabians is one of the main social and informal networks through which political activity is carried out. However, by taking no formal policy stance, the Young Fabians has been able to include both supporters and sceptics of past Labour governments.

The Young Fabians also fills the gap between student politics and mainstream Labour Party politics, a gap which is filled in the Liberal Democrat and Conservative Party structures by having youth wings which include graduates up to the age of 30.

== Young Fabian alumni ==
Young Fabian alumni have played significant roles in British public life, with many entering the British parliament and holding offices of state. Young Fabian alumni include Professor Colin Crouch, Brian Lapping, Howard Glennerster, Giles Radice, Conrad Russell, Michael Crick, Peter Mandelson, Jack Straw, Stephen Twigg, Ann Taylor, Vince Cable, John Mann, Phil Woolas, Oona King, Paul Sweeney, Lorna Fitzsimons, Paul Richards, Tom Watson, Liam Byrne, Stella Creasy, Seema Malhotra, Sunder Katwala, Mark Leonard, Jessica Asato, Conor McGinn, Steve Race (politician), Sara Ibrahim, Keir Mather, Jessica Toale, Jeevun Sandher and Kirith Entwistle.

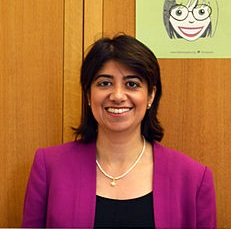
Seema Malhotra MP, former National Chair of the Young Fabians and founder of the Fabian Women's Network

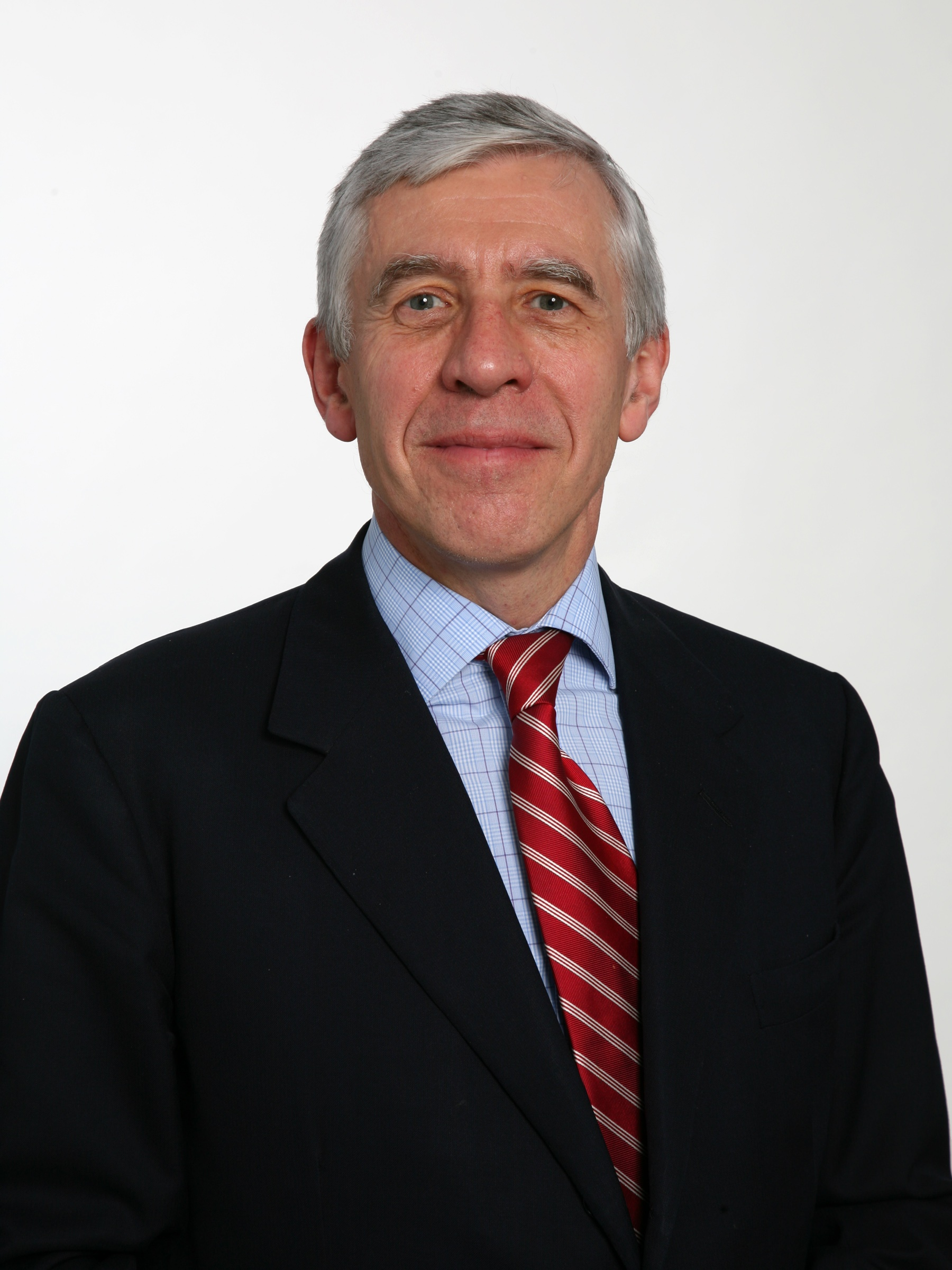
Jack Straw

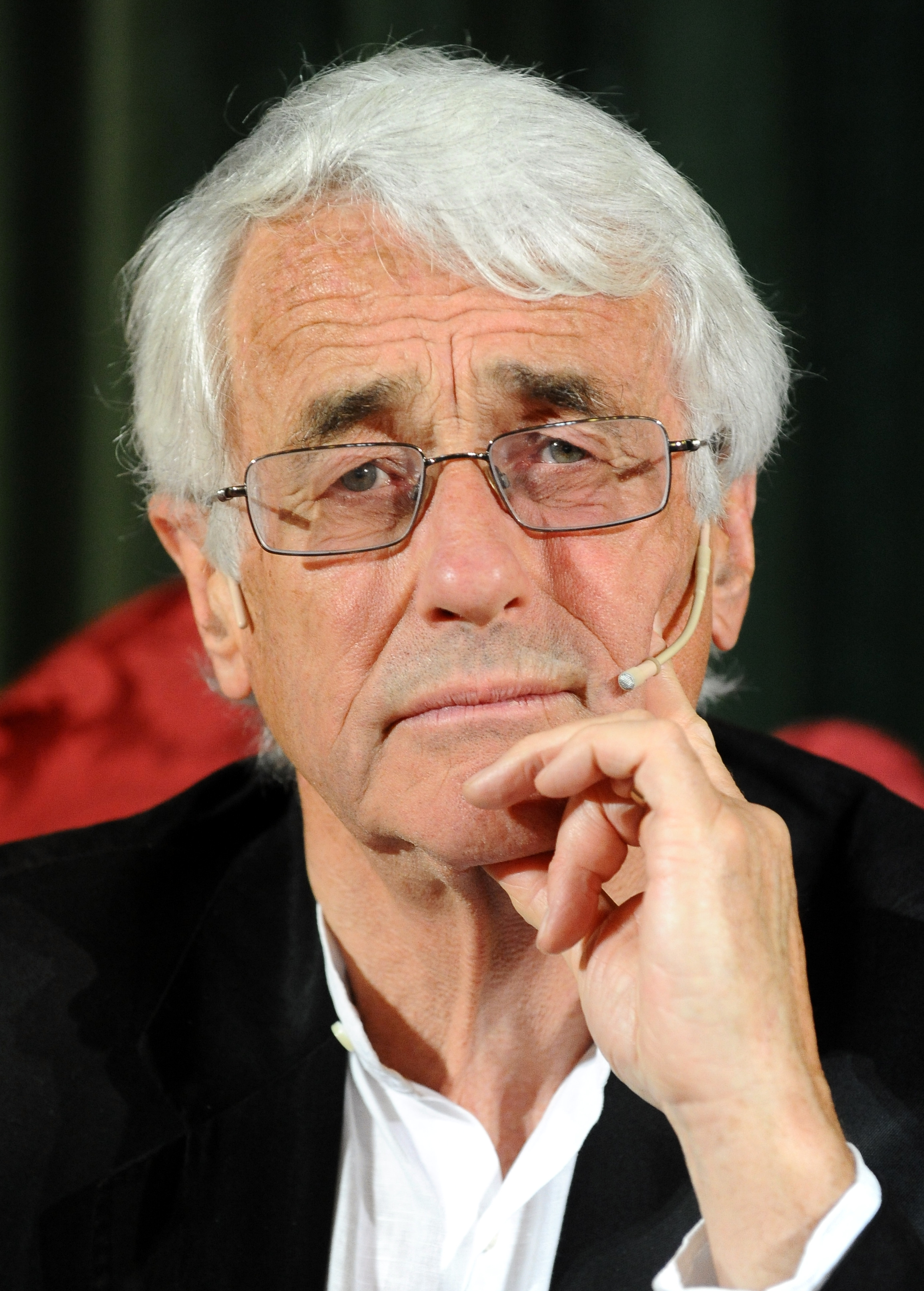
Colin Crouch, sociologist and political scientist

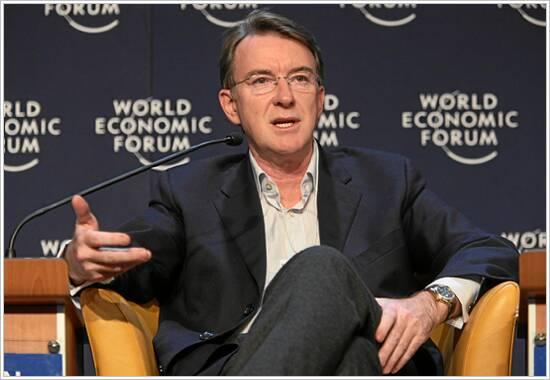
Lord Peter Mandelson

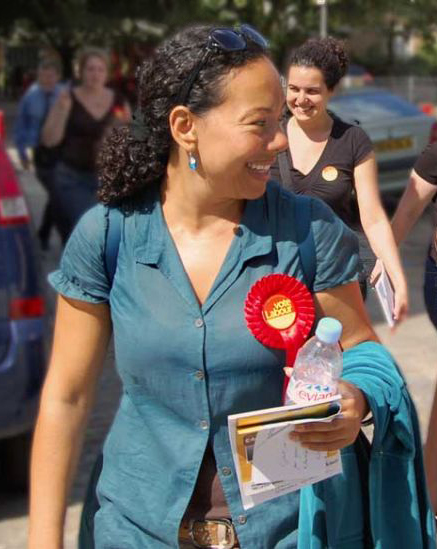
The Baroness King of Bow

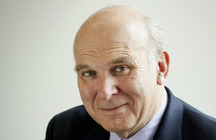
Dr Vince Cable, former leader of the Lib Dems

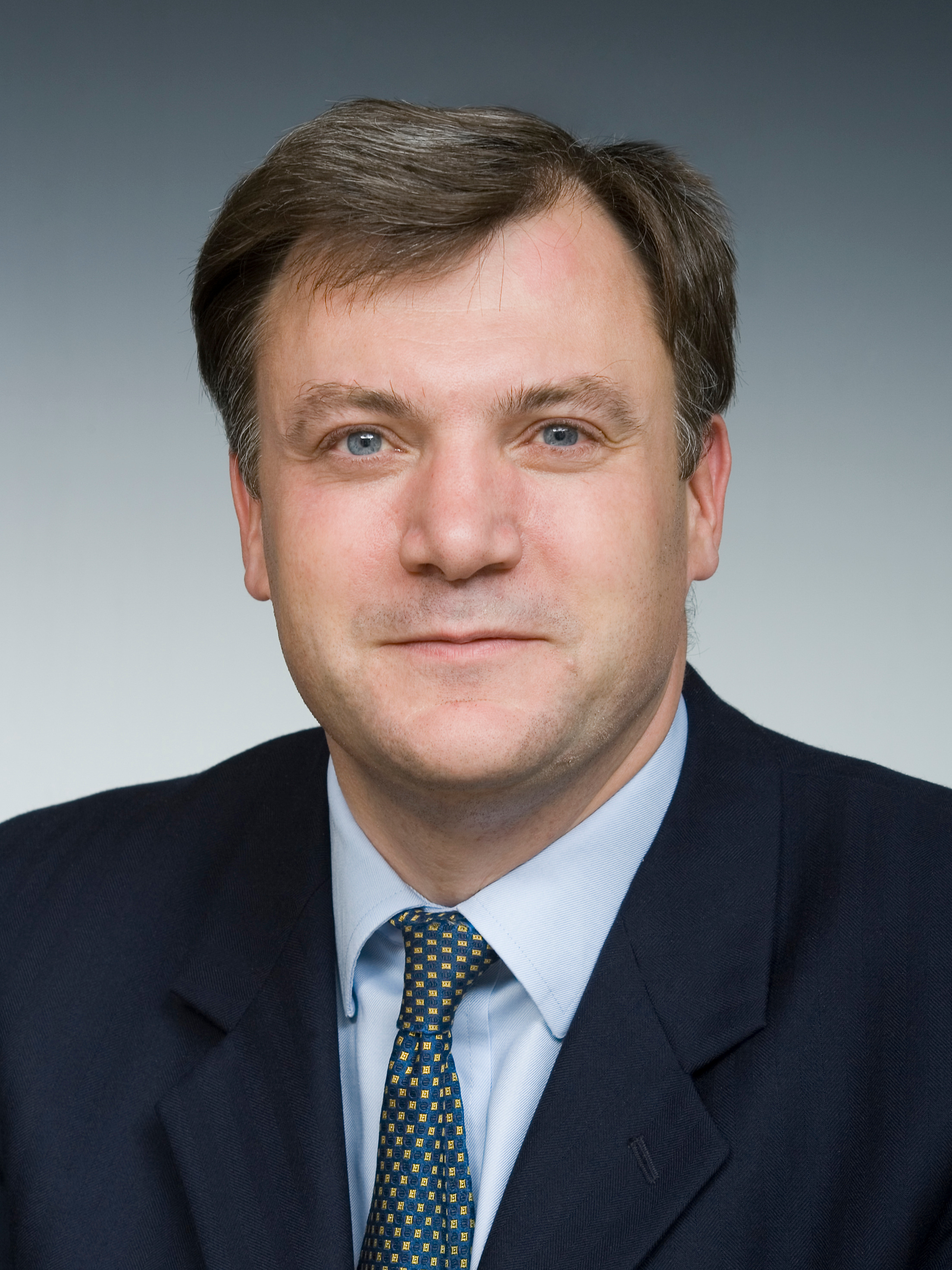
Ed Balls, former Shadow Chancellor of the Exchequer

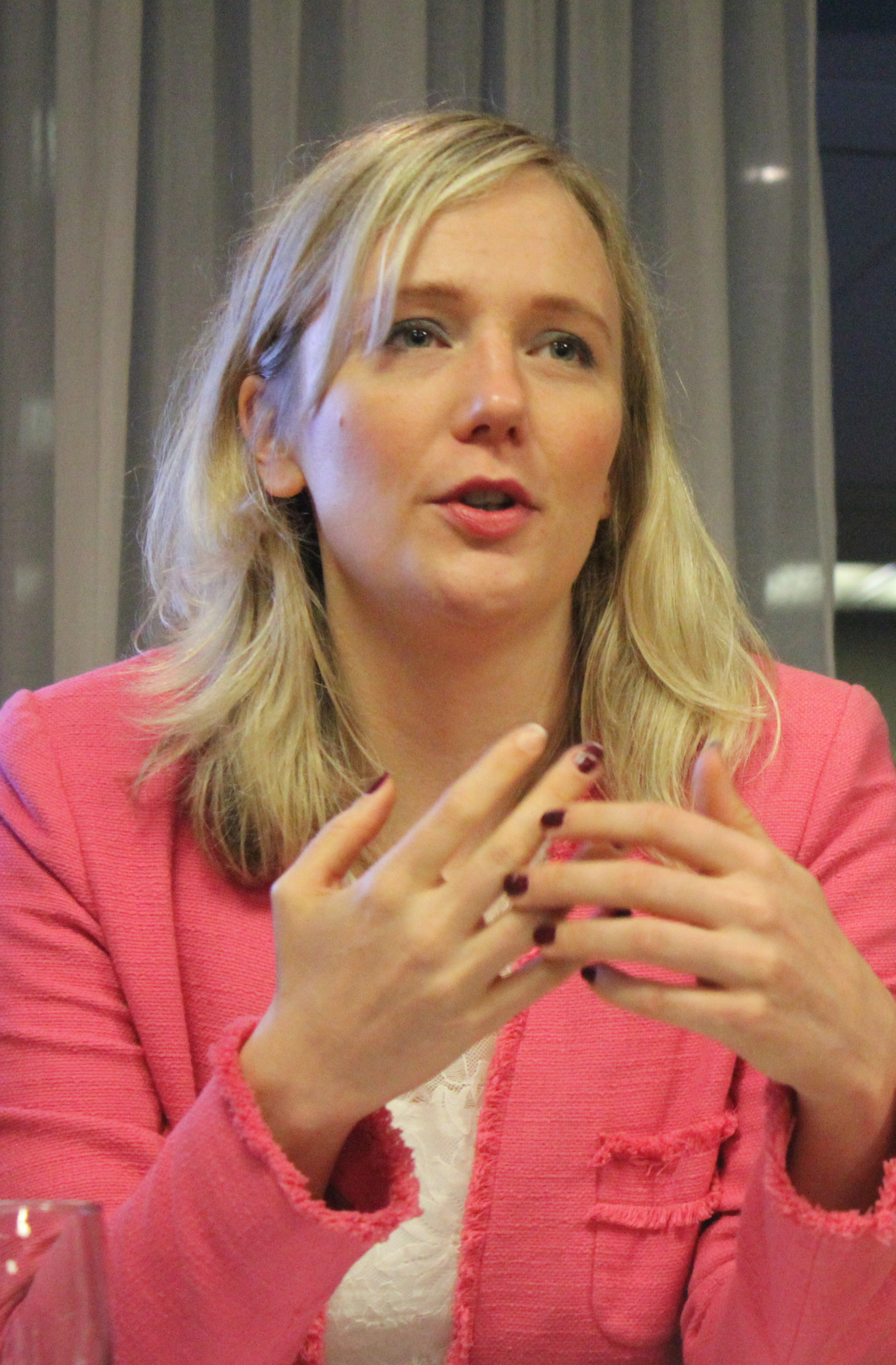
Stella Creasy MP, Labour Party deputy leadership candidate and former Young Fabian Executive member

== The Young Fabians today ==
In recent years the Young Fabians has seen a surge in membership, which had grown to more than 2,000 members as of 2017 from around 1,400 in 2014. It regularly holds a series of events including policy seminars, debates and receptions in foreign embassies, and publishes magazine Anticipations, which moved to being quarterly to twice-yearly in 2020.

The Young Fabians are distinct from other youth movements in their focus on ideas and policy. Like the Fabian Society, the Young Fabians promote the discussion and dissemination of ideas to help shape Labour Party policy. It holds its annual AGM every November alongside the main Fabian Society AGM. It also holds regular social events, with its annual summer boat party on the Thames having become a popular fixture in the Westminster calendar for young members and activists.

While primarily a research based organisation, the Young Fabians also held a series of campaign day events for members across the UK during the 2017 general election, including in Reading, Oxford, Wolverhampton and Birmingham as well as London, and have run a number of international campaigning trips. Recent campaigning visits include going to Florida for the 2016 presidential election and to Sweden for their 2014 general election.

Under the auspices of the Young Fabians International Network, Young Fabian research trips have also been conducted in recent years to China (2015), Brussels (2015), Sweden (2015), Israel and Palestine (2015 and 2016) and the United States (2016). It has also held a number of delegations to Europe with the Young European Socialists.

In March 2020 the Young Fabians moved to holding all of its events and activities online during the COVID-19 pandemic. At their November 2020 AGM the Young Fabians voted to change the way they vote for their executive committee from the block vote system to single transferable vote, and to add Women's Officer and National Coordinator roles to their constitutional roles. They later changed their voting system back to block vote the following year.

== The Young Fabians Networks ==
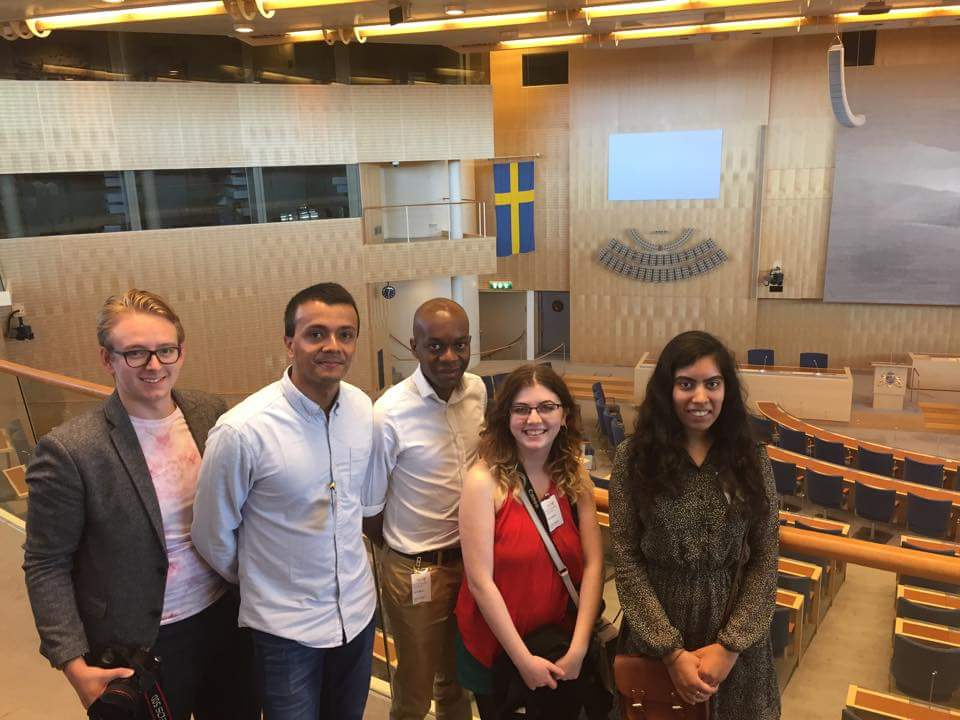
Young Fabians International Network at the Riksdag

In 2010 the Young Fabians launched two special interest groups focused on finance and science industries. These networks set out to bring together those involved or who have an interest in the subject, and link their specialist knowledge into policy debate. In 2011 a Health Network was launched. In 2013 saw the brief existence of Foreign Policy and Creative Industry networks, and in 2014 a Local Government Network was intended to open. 2015 saw the largest expansion of networks with the founding of Education, International and Communications networks, followed by further addition of the Law and Technology networks in 2016.

Each network is run by a steering committee who manage their own annual programme, and since 2012 the networks have elected their own Chairs and other officers.

== Young Fabian Executives ==
The Executives of the Young Fabians are elected in the run up to the November AGM and hold office for one year. Recent Executives and Chairs have included:

Young Fabian Chairs
Year	Chair
1960	Stephen Hatch
1960–1961	Hilary Chantler
1961–1962	Rex Winsbury
1962–1963	Richard Bone
1963–1964	Howard Glennerster
1964–1965	Jack Sumner
1965–1966	Robert McFarland
1966–1967	Rosalind Steele
1967–1968	Giles Radice
1968–1969	Nicholas Bosanquet
1969–1970	Bruce Lloyd
1970–1971	David Keene
1971–1972	Colin Crouch
1972–1973	Isla Evans
1973–1974	Guy Fiegehen
1974–1975	Ian Wilson
1975–1976	John Chesshire
1976–1977	Toby Harris
1977–1978	Steve Hoier
1978–1979	Nick Butler
1979–1980	Stephen Brooks
1980–1981	Michael Crick
1983–1984	Paul Goulding
1984–1985	Andrew Cook
1985–1986	Sarah Gilmore
1986–1993	
1993–1994	Katherine Edwards
1994–1995	Darren Kalynuk
1995–1996	Emma Beswick
1996–1997	Tom Happold
1997–1998	Peter Metcalfe
1998–1999	Howard Dawber
1999–2000	Seema Malhotra
2000–2001	Mari Williams
2001–2002	Guy Lodge
2002–2003	James Connal
2003–2004	Jessica Asato
2004–2005	Kevin Bonavia
2005–2006	Prema Gurunathan
2006–2007	Conor McGinn
2007–2008	Mark Rusling
2008–2009	Kate Groucutt
2009–2010	David Chaplin
2010–2011	Adrian Prandle
2011–2012	Sara Ibrahim
2012–2013	Steve Race (politician)
2013–2014	James Hallwood
2014–2015	A. Adranghi
2015–2016	Martin Edobor
2016–2017	Ellie Groves
2017–2018	Ria Bernard
2018–2019	Charlotte Norton
2019–2020	Adam Allnutt
2020–2021	Mark Whittaker
2021–2022	Laura Cunliffe-Hall
2022–2023	James Potts
2023–2024	Francesca Reynolds and Patrick Cook
2024–2025	Francesca Reynolds and Rosanna Jackson
2025–	Kasia Kramer and Yusuf Amin

== Young Fabian Press ==
- Anticipations – Quarter-yearly print magazine of the Young Fabians

Former Projects

- Anatomy – Former policy project-centric serial

== See also ==
- Democratic socialism
- Ethical movement
- Fabian strategy
- Gradualism
- Keir Hardie
- Labour Research Department
- List of UK think tanks
- Reformism
- Social democracy
