= Colin Crouch =

British sociologist and political scientist (born 1944)

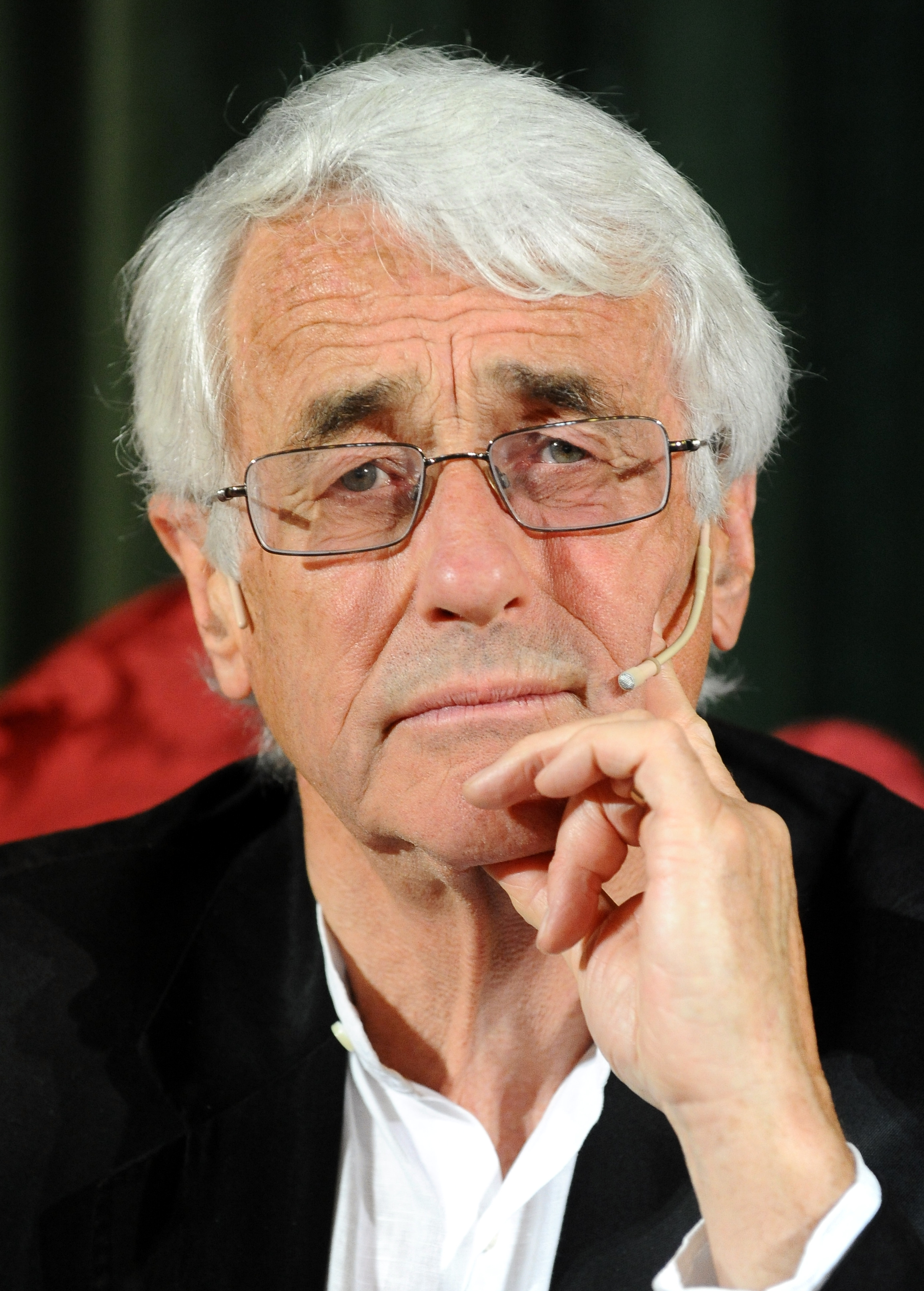
- Crouch in 2013
- Born: 1 March 1944 (age 82); Isleworth, England
- Occupations: Sociologist; Political scientist

Academic work
- Institutions: University of Warwick
- Notable works: Coping with Post-Democracy

Colin John Crouch, FBA (born 1 March 1944) is an English sociologist and political scientist. He coined the post-democracy concept in 2000 in his book Coping with Post-Democracy. Colin Crouch is currently Emeritus Professor at the University of Warwick and an External Scientific Member of the Max Planck Institute for the Study of Societies.

== Biography ==
Crouch was born in Isleworth on 1 March 1944. He gained his BA at the LSE and his doctorate at Nuffield College, Oxford. In 1969, Crouch started as a lecturer in sociology at the London School of Economics. From 1972 to 1973 he was a Lecturer at the University of Bath and was Chair of the Young Fabians. From 1973 to 1985 he was Lecturer and Reader in Sociology at the London School of Economics and Political Science. Then, from 1985 to 1994 he was a Fellow of Trinity College, Oxford, and Professor of Sociology at the University of Oxford. From 1995 to 2000 he was curator of their Bodleian Library. From 1995 to 2004 he was Professor of Sociology and chaired the department of Political Science at the European University Institute of Florence. From 2005 until 2011 he was Professor of Governance and Public Management at Warwick Business School. In 2005, he was elected fellow of the British Academy. Since 2011 he has been Emeritus Professor at the International Centre for Governance and Public Management, Warwick Business School, University of Warwick. He is also an External Scientific Member of the Max Planck Institute for the Study of Societies in Cologne.

== Post-democracy ==
Crouch coined the term post-democracy in 2000 in his book Coping with Post-Democracy. It designates states that are conducted by fully operating democratic systems (elections are being held, governments fall and there is freedom of speech), but whose application is progressively limited. A small elite is making the tough decisions and co-opts the democratic institutions. Crouch developed the idea in an article called Is there a liberalism beyond social democracy? for the think tank Policy Network and in his subsequent book The Strange Non-Death of Neo-Liberalism. The term appeared to define a running evolution within democracies during the 21st century and is polemical because it calls attention to recognized democracies losing some of their foundations and evolving towards an aristocratic regime.

== See also ==
- Iron law of oligarchy
- Neonormalization
- Post-politics
- Policy Network

== Publications ==
- The Student Revolt, Bodley Head, London 1970
- Class Conflict and the Industrial Relations Crisis, Heineman, London 1977
- (Ed. with Alessandro Pizzorno) The Resourgence of Class Conflict in Western Europe Since 1968, 2 Volumes. Mamillan. London 1978
- The Politics of Industrial Relations, Fontana 1979
- Trade Unions: The Logic of Collective Action, Fontana 1982
- Industrial Relations and European State Traditions, Clarendon Press, Oxford 1993
- (Ed. with Wolfgang Streeck) The Political Economy of Modern Capitalism: Mapping Convergence and Diversity, (1997)
- Post-democracy, Polity Press, Cambridge 2005, ISBN 0-7456-3314-5
- The Strange Non-death of Neo-liberalism, John Wiley & Sons, Hoboken 2011, ISBN 978-0-7456-5221-4
- Making Capitalism Fit for Society, Polity Press, Cambridge 2013, ISBN 9780745672229
- The Knowledge Corrupters. Hidden Consequences of the Financial Takeover of Public Life, Polity Press, Cambridge 2015, ISBN 9780745669854
- Post-democracy - After the Crisis, Polity Press, 2020, ISBN 9781509541577

Party political offices
Preceded by Nicholas Bosanquet	Chairman of the Fabian Society; 1975–1976	Succeeded by Giles Radice
