= Peter Burnham =

British political scientist

Peter Burnham is a Marxist professor of political science and international studies at the University of Birmingham. He was previously based at the University of Warwick, where he was head of department in the Department of Politics and International Studies from 2004 to 2008 and where he remains an associate fellow. His interests lie in the areas of British politics (specifically economic policy making, including exchange rate regimes), radical international political economy, state theory, and political science research methods (particularly the use of national archives). He earned his BA and a PhD at the University of Warwick. He has an avid interest in Smith and Riccardo, as well as the Labour Theory of Value.

Burnham's publications include The Political Economy of Postwar Reconstruction (Macmillan, 1990), A Major Crisis? The Politics of Economic Policy in Britain in the 1990s (co-authored, Dartmouth, 1995), Remaking the Postwar World Economy: Robot and British Policy in the 1950s (Palgrave Macmillan, 2003), Global Restructuring, State, Capital and Labour: Contesting Neo-Gramscian Perspectives (co-authored, Palgrave Macmillan, 2006), and Research Methods in Politics (co-authored, Palgrave Macmillan, second edition 2008).

== See also ==
- Open Marxism
- Depoliticisation
- John Holloway (sociologist)
