= Postfunctionalism =

Theory of European integration

Postfunctionalism is a theory of European integration put forward by Liesbet Hooghe and Gary Marks in 2008. It is in opposition to the previous two main theories of European integration—neofunctionalism and intergovernmentalism—as they could not explain critical aspects of European integration such as referendums and European issues becoming a part of national politics.

Postfunctionalism emphasises that the European Union has become politicised, and that it is now hard to separate the politics of the EU from that of member states. Hence, the preferences of political parties and national publics now play a crucial role in shaping the EU's politics and integration. Postfunctionalism also puts people's identities at the heart of the debate on European integration, as identifying as European vs. national has a strong correlation with a person's support of the EU and European integration.

In 2019, Hooghe and Marks advocated for a pluralist approach to theories of European integration. On this account, neofunctionalism, intergovernmentalism and postfunctionalism are not competing approaches but, rather, lenses that discipline our thinking about "the behavior of key actors, the arenas in which they act, and the causal mechanisms that connect their actions to institutional outcomes". Each approach offers a distinct analysis of EU crises where "the Eurocrisis, the migration crisis, Brexit, and illiberalism can be viewed as episodes of intergovernmental bargaining, path-dependent spillovers, and ideological conflict". Rather than test the theories themselves, these theories can be "mined for conflicting hypotheses that can be systematically tested against each other".

== Summary of Hooghe and Marks (2019) Grand Theories of European Integration in the Twenty-First Century ==
	Liberal Intergovernmentalism	Neofunctionalism	Postfunctionalism
Key Actors	National governments of MS	transnational social agents demand and supranational entrepreneurs supply further integration	Eurosceptic publics and parties, and mainstream parties responding to new transnational cleavage
Driver of (Dis)integration	Integration deepens because economic cooperation is beneficial to national leaders	Integration is driven by transnational social pressures for greater cooperation	Ideological conflict between functional pressures for integration and nationalist resistance to integration
Main Logic	MS decision process: (1) government preferences formed by powerful domestic groups, (2) intergovernmental bargaining is shaped by asymmetrical interdependence among MS, (3) MS delegate authority to supranational institutions in order to secure compliance to the deal which typically take the form of LCM solutions.	spillover effect: when integration in one policy any spills over in other policy areas by creating opportunities for further cooperation or unanticipated problems that only further integration am resolve.	Assessing the causes and effects of politicisation: (1) mismatch between institutional status quo and functional pressures for multi-level governance, (2) is decision-making insulated or politicised, meaning it takes place in mass polities, which depends on issue and capacity of elites to depoliticise, and mass politics opens door for national identity to constrain integration. (3) how does integration structure political conflict? If integration touches upon the configuration of core state powers then this activates a durable socio-political cleavage that reconfigures domestic party politics.
Predicted outcome	Unanimity rules in the Council generate LCM solutions. Integration blocked when it touches high politics which is when MS governments take over.	Further integration as integration trajectory is characterised by path dependence where past integration progressively narrows the range of options and crises push integration through be cause status quo is untenable but reversing course is not possible.characterised by path dependence	Transition from permissive consensus to constraining dissensus. New GAL-TAN transnational cleavage that reconfigures domestic politics. And opens the possibility for disintegration.
Eurocrisis	Southern MS receiving bailouts in inferior position so the outcome of Eurozone governance favoured the Northern MS	Failing forward dynamic is the result of prior incomplete policies (monetary union without financial backstop) and a path dependent logic that pushed through further integration. Crisis arose from unintended spill over that materialised supranational empowerment	Explains the delayed and ineffective response to the Euro area crisis as a result of domestic nationalist opposition to European integration. Politicised procrastination carried a high cost in the Northern and Southern MS in the form of Eurosceptic parties. Eurocrisis broke the permissive consensus that enabled elite problem solving and activated the GAL-TAN fault line that pitted pro-European solutions against defenders of national interest.
Migration Crisis	During the migration crisis MS suspended migration agreements (Dublin rules) to secure their borders. While financial interests successfully pushed for further integration during the Eurocrisis, humanitarian groups were weaker and failed to secure cooperation.	Migration crisis nonetheless generated further integration. Dublin regime was an incomplete solution that supranational entrepreneurs sought to improve. They failed but supranational institutions acquired authority over monitoring of borders and processing migrant applications.	Migration crisis forced racist Europeans to take-in racialised people. Immigration became dominant issue in domestic politics which radical right parties used to garner support and forced their states to reintroduce border controls. For example, Merkel's party shifted positions in early 2016 as their popularity fell and they negotiated a deal with Turkey to block migration flows.
Brexit	Brexit is illusory and will not affect significantly affect UK's economic cooperation with the EU (Moravcsik 2016). The UK will likely preserve a high degree of cooperation while symbolically preserving its sovereignty.	Predicts UK divorce from EU will be soft but does not really explain why it happened.	Illustrates tensions between functionalist pressures to integration and nationalist resistance. Brexit referendum was Cameron's calculated decision to suppress a rejectionist faction in the conservative party that back fired. The GAL-TAN pole implies strong polarisation. As predicted, the Brexit debate took place between Remainers that emphasised economic benefits and Leavers that emphasised national identity and the two sides never touched. The decisive issue was migration.
Illiberalism in Poland and Hungary	Illiberalism is consistent with maintaining economic interdependence. Consensus decision making disables the effective application of Article 7. National sovereignty sustained by making sanctions to rule-of- law breeches conditional on agreement among all MS.	Commission has expanded its toolkit to evaluate and punish rule of law breaches in Poland and Hungary. Commission opened Article 7 proceedings against both countries. In the Multi-Annual Financial Framework, it included funding for justice and rule-of-law, and made certain financial contributions conditional on fulfilling rule of law requirements. ECJ expanded to include cases of infringement on domestic independence of courts.	Where did illiberalism come from? Pis and Fidesz took more politicised stances on the GALTAN dimension to rally against migrants, multinationals and the EU. Fidesz constitutional reforms drove strong polarisation domestically. EPP tolerated illiberalism in Poland and Hungary because it would cost them seats. Illiberalism defended by allies and criticised by cosmopolitans.

== See also ==
- Neofunctionalism
- Intergovernmentalism
