= Steve Race (politician) =

British Labour Party politician

Stephen Race MP
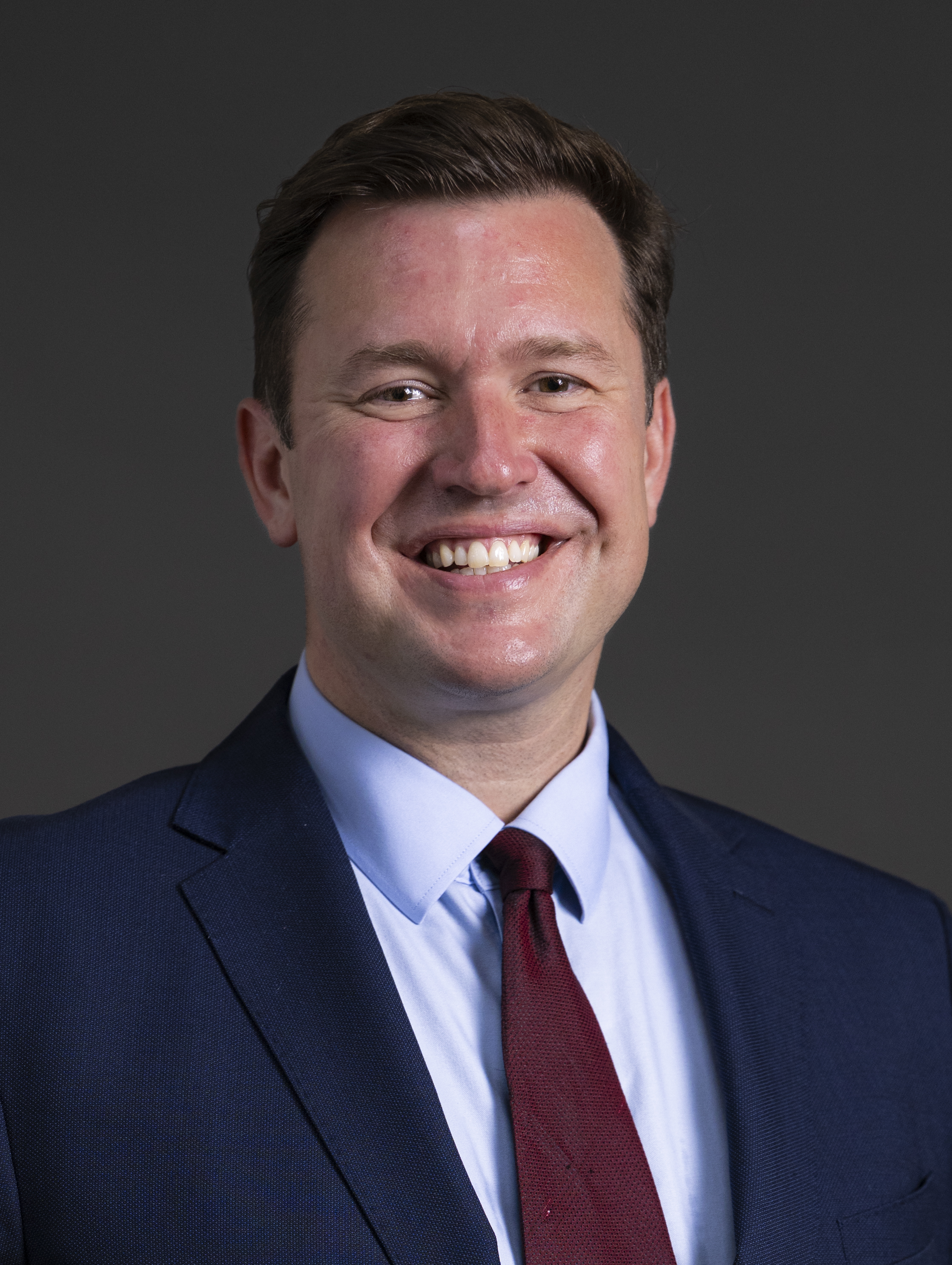
- Official portrait, 2026

Member of Parliament for Exeter
- Incumbent
- Assumed office 4 July 2024
- Preceded by: Ben Bradshaw
- Majority: 11,937 (29.7%)

Member of Hackney London Borough Council for Hoxton East and Shoreditch
- In office 3 May 2018 – 2 May 2024

Personal details
- Born: Stephen Race; 1983 (age 42–43) Kingston upon Hull, East Yorkshire, England
- Party: Labour
- Education: University of Manchester
- Website: https://steverace.org.uk/

Stephen Race (born 1983) is a British Labour Party politician who has served as Member of Parliament for Exeter since 2024.

== Early life and career ==
Race was born in Hull in 1983, and had a younger sister who was born with Hurler syndrome, an incurable genetic condition. He studied BA Literature & Social Sciences at Manchester University. In his twenties, Race raised £20,000 for his late sister’s children’s hospice while doing the Three Peaks Challenge.

Race's professional career was largely spent in communications and consultancy. He was a senior director at consulting firm BCW and senior counsel at Lexington Communications. Both of these companies have provided services to fossil fuel companies. Race has also been criticised for Lexington's association to the UK's private water industry.

== Political career ==
Between 2007 and 2011 he worked as a Senior Parliamentary Researcher for Exeter's Member of Parliament, Ben Bradshaw. He was Chair of the Young Fabians between 2012 and 2013. Subsequently he was an Associate Director with FleishmanHillard and served as a councillor on Hackney Council, representing Hoxton East and Shoreditch from 2018 until 2024.

He contested East Devon in the 2015 general election.

== Parliamentary career ==
In July 2022 members of Exeter Labour Party selected him from a shortlist of four to be their parliamentary candidate, following Ben Bradshaw's decision to retire after 25 years in Parliament. At the 2024 general election, he was elected to Parliament.

He is listed as an LGBTQ+ Member of Parliament in 2024 by PinkNews.

== Political positions ==
When asked to summarise his political philosophy in three words in a 2023 interview, Race responded "European Social Democracy". He also named Ernest Bevin as his political hero.

Homelessness prevention is a priority for Race.

Race is "passionate" about animal welfare, and has made efforts for a national phase-out of animal testing.

Race supports Exeter City Council becoming a unitary authority.
