= Post-politics =

Critique of post-Cold War politics of consensus

Post-politics is a term in social sciences used to describe the effects of depoliticisation—a move away from the antagonistic political discourse, empowering unelected technocrats with decisions—in the late 20th and early 21st centuries, when the representative democracies of the post–Cold War era had arguably entered depoliticisation. Generally related to and used alongside similar terms such as "post-democracy" and "the post-political", the term "post-politics" carries negative connotations of depriving the people from having a voice on issues deemed settled by the elites.

== Terminology ==
The history of the term "post-politics" is disputed: Slavoj Žižek in 1999 attributed it to Jacques Rancière, with the latter denying ever using it. Rancière argued, however, that after the dissolution of the Soviet bloc, the resulting "end of history" feeling caused "an internal weakening of the very democracy that was assumed to have triumphed", and that the neoliberal state institutions increasingly started to make decisions that traditionally belonged to the legislatures.

=== Depoliticisation ===
The term "depoliticisation" (also American English: depoliticization) has been used extensively in the late 20th and early 21st centuries in many contexts, ranging from central banking to philosophy. Despite this, little analysis has been done on the precise definition, resulting in a lack of terminological precision.

Depoliticisation can be broadly described as politicians offloading the decision making to technocrats or "the strategic shifting of blame and responsibility away from political actors and the removal of potentially contentious issues from the realm of public debate" Peter Burnham observed that the politicians usually retain effective control by proxy: depoliticisation is "the process of placing at one remove the political character of decisionmaking".

The benefits of depoliticisation occur on few levels:

- society (and markets) as a whole can benefit from decoupling long-term decisions from the short-term election cycle;
- governance can improve by offloading the day-to-day decisions from ministers, freeing them up to think about more strategic goals;
- individual politicians gain ability to disassociate themselves from results of the bad policies (electoral "risk management").

Flinders and Buller describe three approaches ("tactics") of depoliticisation:

- institutional depoliticisation occurs when the politicians use non-elected administrators that have a wide discretion in setting up policies within the pre-set mandate. This common approach releases the appointed administrator from the short-term political pressure. An example is provided by the political reforms of British New Labour in 1997 that created many new institutions, like a Postal Services Commission for regulating the mail service.
- rule-based depoliticisation occurs when explicit rules are laid down so politicians can withstand the electoral pressure by claiming that their "hands are tied". The expectation is that the day-to-day political negotiation can be avoided, as the policy choices become "technical";
- preference-shaping (ideological) depoliticisation happens when a government proclaims that some issues are simply beyond the scope of politics or state control. The options contradictory to this normative view of one side of the discourse are declared "irrational" (an example is provided by the broad consensus about non-intervention of politics into the sphere of central banking).

Depoliticisation has "emerged as a significant analytical framework in political science" in the 21st century.

While the broad agreement between political parties carries some benefits, it is associated with voters being denied the political choice, thus causing public distrust in the political institutions (anti-politics). In the 21st century, depoliticisation has been linked to disillusionment with neoliberalism. Depoliticisation has negative consequences for government legitimacy, and anti-political sentiment through populism, can result in repoliticisation.

=== Post-political ===
There is no agreement among the researchers on the precise definition of the post-political terms either (Wilson & Swyngedouw list 27 works where the terms are "highly contested" involving "a great deal of confusion"). In a broad sense, all definitions describe a political arrangement, where the political discourse, with its characteristic contestation, has been displaced by policies handled through technocratic means and legitimized participatory processes that at best select the policies from a narrow selection of the outcomes predefined by experts.

Post-politics replaces disruptive citizens ("the people") with consumers ("the population"), expected, through elections, to make a choice of managers based on private economic necessities. The overall framework that includes representative democracy, free market economics, and cosmopolitan liberalism cannot be questioned.

=== "There is no alternative" ===
Researchers of populism generally agree that its growth in the 1990s is the result of political elites accepting certain concepts (like free market) as unalterable truths. This consensus, frequently expressed as "there is no alternative" (Margaret Thatcher) or German: alternativlos (Angela Merkel), and the associated disappearance of the political discord created a virtual "party cartel", where the views of established parties did not differ on policies. Due to growing inequality part of the electorate found itself on the losing end of these policies, but the agency of voting became hollow, as no mainstream parties were able to challenge the consensus.

== History ==
Wilson & Swyngedouw trace the post-political era to the concept of the end of history by Francis Fukayama (1992), who also declared the "end of politics".

Generated by a cohort of prominent philosophers – namely Jacques Rancière, Alain Badiou and Slavoj Žižek – and their concern with politics as the institution of radical, active equality, the critique of post-politics claims that the politics of consensus has created a systematic foreclosure of the properly political moment: with the institution of a series of new "post-democratic" governmental techniques, internal politics proper is reduced to social administration. Meanwhile, with the rise of the postmodernist "politics of self" comes a concomitant new "politics of conduct", in which political values are replaced by moral ones (what Chantal Mouffe terms "politics in the register of morality").

== Roots of the post-political consensus ==
=== The global political landscape post-1989 ===
The disintegration of the Eastern communist bloc following the fall of the Berlin Wall in 1989 announced the end of the Cold War era, and with it the great ideological stand-off between East and West, between the communist and capitalist worlds. In the eyes of Western society, Capitalism emerged the victor, with liberal democracy as its corresponding political doctrine. With the fall of state-communism in the former Soviet Union and its proxies following the attempted 1991 coup and subsequent disintegration of the bloc, the USSR ceased to exist, and its de facto successor, the Russian Federation, abdicated the former's role as a key political player and advocate for world communism, thus abandoning its former purportedly social democratic, Keynesian form; and neoliberalism entered a new global phase. With Francis Fukuyama's End of History as its founding statement, this was the birth of the post-political, post-ideological "Zeitgeist".

=== Intellectual climate ===
Alongside Fukuyama, various other intellectual currents are associated with the consolidation of the post-political consensus. The "reflexive modernity" thesis of post-industrial sociologists Anthony Giddens and Ulrich Beck, for example, has acted as the intellectual accompaniment to Third Way politics. In "reflexive modernity", say these authors, the central imperative of political action shifts from issues of social welfare (a politics of redistribution) to the management of "risk" (a politics of "distributive responsibility"): that is, the "environmental externalities" that are the ever more visible, unwanted by-products of techno-economic progress. For both Beck and Giddens it is this imperative, and the new "social reflexivity" that has developed in response – rather than instrumental rationality or, crucially, political struggle – that has driven the profound social changes of the post-war period. Indeed, for Giddens, it is "social reflexivity" – the enhanced autonomy of individual action called forth by the dispersal of socio-technological knowledge and risk in "post-traditional" society – that paves the way for:

1. Post-Fordist production (based as it is on flexible production and bottom-up decision-making);
2. The reconfiguration of society's relation to authority (political, expert and administrative, both within the state and beyond) according to the principles of deliberation and "active trust".

According to both Beck and Giddens, these changes render obsolete material, class-based, ideologically grounded politics organised via traditional, collective forms such as the party or trade union. In their place, we see the emergence of a new "politics of self" ("subpolitics" in Beck; "life politics" in Giddens) in which, as part of the wider post-modern turn, issues previously considered to be purely personal enter the political arena.

Not all commentators agree with this version of events, however, and it is the critical perspectives considered in this section from which the post-political critique derives. Nikolas Rose, for example, counters Beck and Giddens by highlighting the role of a new governmental "politics of conduct" in forging the political subjectivities that emerge with the advent of Third Way politics in Britain under New Labour (and, by extension, in developed nations in the post-industrial period). Against Giddens' "social reflexivity"-based account, Rose's study of this new "ethopolitics" suggests that it is the strictures of the new, market individualist (Schumpeterian) forms of governance-beyond-the-state that has driven the recent emphasis on the autonomous, freedom-aspiring, self-sufficient individual. A key feature of "ethopolitics", says Rose, is its concern with the ethical, rather than political sensibilities of its subjects; a trend wholly consistent with the moralistic turn that politics took on under neoliberalism. Indeed, in his work on the decline of the public sector in Britain, David Marquand relates the moral ideology that – via the wider "revenge of the private" – underpinned the neoliberal reforms and sell-offs imposed on the sector by the Thatcher and Blair governments. This is a key development to which the post-political critique responds: Mouffe speaks here of "politics played out in the register of morality"; while Rancière's re-envisioning of the political is an express challenge against the de-politicisation of political philosophy that occurred with the field's Aristotelian, "ethical" turn in the late 1980s.

Similarly, while Beck points to environmentalism as a paradigm case of the progressive potential of the personalisation of politics, Erik Swyngedouw reminds us that in the guise in which it most often appears in the developed world, environmentalism's emphasis on personal lifestyle choices and on particularist struggles against the locally felt effects of environmental "bads" can work to draw attention away from the properly political issue of human society's structural relationship with nature. Likewise, Beck celebrates the new scepticism associated with post-modern, identity-based politics as a progressive consequence of the universal uncertainty that characterises risk society. By contrast, critics lament the profound consequences that the anti-essentialist position on truth has had for the imagination of "grand narratives" (read political teleologies) – for proponents of the post-political critique, it is these grand narratives that are the real substance of politics.

== The post-political critique ==
Proponents of the post-political critique do not represent a united theoretical body. Nonetheless, and excepting Mouffe, the philosophers associated with this critique are sometimes treated together, based on:

- The contribution they have made in recent years to the beginnings of a reinvigoration of radical left thought.
- Their concern with active, radical equality (equality as an axiomatic given, in contrast to formal equality) and with human emancipation.
- Their broadly materialist bent – while engaging to a greater or lesser degree with Marxism in their later work, all were influenced by Marxism in their early years. Additionally, while influenced by it in important ways, all depart substantially from post-structuralism.

What Rancière, Badiou and Žižek, along with Mouffe, agree upon is that under the present post-political conjuncture we have seen a systematic foreclosure of the "properly political dimension", the reinstitution of which will depend upon a radical re-envisioning of our notion of the political.

Against the widespread resignation to addressing politics solely at the ontic or empirical level – that is, a concern with the "facts of politics" or with politics as 'the exercise of power or the deciding of common affairs' – this re-envisioning must, they say, concern itself with the ontological dimension of politics: that is, with the essence of the political. While each conceptualises the properly political in different ways, all agree upon its irreducibly and inherently antagonistic dimension: a radical-progressive position must, says Žižek, 'insist on the unconditional primacy of the inherent antagonism as constitutive of the political'. Hence the charge that post-politics, with consensus as its defining logic, forecloses the properly political.

=== Rancière's account of the political ===
==== Politics versus police ====
Rancière's work reclaims the notion of politics. For him, the latter does not consist in 'the exercise of power or the deciding of common affairs', as is ordinarily assumed. Rather, if politics is born out of the fact of sharing a common space and thus common concerns; and if 'every decision on common affairs requires the prior existence of the common', politics proper surely, says Rancière, denotes the inherent antagonism that exists between competing representations of this common.

From this basis, Rancière's account of the political proceeds via the distinction he draws between this latter notion of politics proper (le politique) (as antagonism), and what he terms the police or police order (la police). The fundamental divergence between politics proper and the police, says Rancière, is their respective representations of the common. The former not only recognises, but also calls forth the contested nature of the common. Meanwhile, the police:

‘…symbolises the community as an ensemble of well-defined parts, places and functions, and of the properties and capabilities linked to them, all of which presupposes a fixed distribution of things into common and private – a distinction which itself depends on an ordered distribution of the visible and the invisible, noise and speech, etc…This way of counting [parts, places and functions] simultaneously defines the ways of being, doing, and saying appropriate to these places.'

In this sense (and although he disagrees with Foucault on some crucial points), Rancière's definition of police is akin to that given to it in Michel Foucault's work.

==== Le partage du sensible (the "partition" or "distribution" of "the perceptible") ====
Rancière's aesthetic conceptualisation of politics allows him to take Foucault's "police" one step further: not only, says Rancière, does the specific allocation of "parts" given in the police order govern ‘the ways of being, doing and saying’ (i.e. the behavioural codes 'appropriate to these places'); rather, as the nomination suggests, this particular "partition of the perceptible" also acts to draw, and subsequently police, the very boundaries of what is and is not visible, audible, comprehendible – in short, perceptible – under this order.

This distinctive insight derives in part from Rancière's enquiry into the origins of democracy and in part from the centrality to his theory of the notion of mésentente. While translated into English simply as "disagreement" (with obvious reference to the constitutively antagonistic element of politics, as discussed above), in French mésentente also implies, in a speech situation, the fact of misunderstanding between parties, or more precisely in the Rancièrian sense of "talking past one another". Rancière's point here is to underline that the fact of misunderstanding is not a neutral one: rather, the partition of the perceptible given in the police order decides whether an enunciation is heard as speech or instead as noise; as rational discourse (as in deliberative democratic theory, such as that of Jürgen Habermas or John Rawls), or instead as a grunt or moan. In Rancière, the fact of labelling a voice "inaudible" is, therefore, associated with the denial of the subject of that voice as a (political) subject.

==== The contingency of the police order: constitutive excess, the miscount and political subjectivation ====
As suggested above, in so far as the "count" always entails a "miscount" (i.e. denies the subjecthood of certain constituencies), the "logic of the proper" according to which the police order operates is incommensurable with the logic of active, radical equality proposed by Rancière. Grounded in his account of the usurpatory action that instituted the demos as the locus of popular sovereignty in ancient Athens, Rancière defines democracy as 'the specific power of those who have no common title to exercise power, except that of not being entitled to its exercise': 'democracy is the paradoxical power of those who do not count: the count of the unaccounted for’. The properly and essentially political "sequence" (to borrow a term from Badiou), then, arises in the rare moment in which les sans-part exercise this title and make their "usurpatory claim" to a stake in the common: in this moment of "political subjectivation" – that is, the coming into being of a new political subject – the logic of equality meets with and violently unclothes the inegalitarian police logic of the proper; les sans-part, asserting the audibility of their voice and the visibility of their collective body, thus seize their place in the partition of the perceptible and overturn the inaugural "wrong" done to them by a police order whose count left them unaccounted for.

For Rancière, this moment of dramatic ‘rupture in the order of legitimacy and domination’ is a constant possibility and as such posits the ultimate contingency of any given police order. This assertion is explained by the specific agency lent to les sans-part by the nature of their relationship to the police. Rancière is at pains to underline that les sans-part is not so much a social class or group excluded and thus awaiting incorporation: that would imply not only a procedural account of equality but also the existence of the emergent political subject – as an identity pre-given in the police order – prior to the political moment, both scenarios not worthy of the name politics according to Rancière. Les sans-part should instead be thought of as a supernumerary category, existing 'at once nowhere and everywhere': '...political subjects are supernumerary collectives which call into question the counting of the community's parts and the relations of inclusion and exclusion which define that count. Subjects...are not reducible to social groups or identities but are, rather, collectives of enunciation and demonstration surplus to the count of social groups'.

It is from this conceptualisation that les sans-part derive their agency: crucially, the police logic of the proper is a logic ‘predicated upon saturation’, upon the assumption that it is possible to designate society as a totality "comprised of groups performing specific functions and occupying determined spaces". As the at-once visible/invisible proof of the age-old adage that, contrary to this logic, 'the whole is more than the sum of its parts', the very existence of les sans-parts as excess therefore radically negates the police logic of the proper.

==== Excess and the universal in Rancière, Žižek, Badiou and Mouffe ====
There would seem to be a contradiction that appears in Rancière's schema (outlined above): political subjectivation entails assertion of a place, yet it also negates the very logic of places, of the proper. Rancière deals with this by specifying that the political moment is called forth only to the extent that the 'part of the no-part' is asserted in such a way that it forms an identification 'with the community as a whole.' Rancière's claim is that this distinctly universalist gesture works to deny the particularist logic that partitions social space into a series of private, proper places, functions and parts, thus resolving the aforementioned contradiction. In his account of the (post-)political, Slavoj Žižek also insists heavily on the role of the universal. For Žižek, a situation becomes political when:

...a particular demand...starts to function as a metaphoric condensation of the global [universal] opposition against Them, those in power, so that the protest is no longer just about that demand, but about the universal dimension that resonates in that particular demand...What post-politics tends to prevent is precisely this metaphoric universalisation of particular demands.

In terms of dealing with the aforementioned contradiction, however, Žižek's concept of the "indivisible remainder" is somewhat more instructive than his emphasis on the universal. The figure of the "remainder" of course corresponds closely to that of "excess" or "surplus" in Rancière. Meanwhile, the notion of "indivisibility" implies a strong resistance to partitioning (perhaps stronger than the universalist gesture upon which Rancière relies).

In this respect, the ontological status of the remainder in Žižek comes closer to that of the privileged figure of Badiou's "non-expressive dialectics": the generic set. Derived from mathematical set theory, a generic set is the name given by its discoverer Paul Cohen to 'the mathematical object without clear description, without name, without place in the classification...[it is] an object the characteristic of which is to have no name'. It therefore offers the solution to the fundamental problem of politics, which according to Badiou presents itself as follows: if in the battle between the suturing logic of Law (the police) and the emancipatory logic of Desire, Desire must necessarily always be directed at something beyond the ontological universe specified by Law, the crucial problem for political action must be to find ways of naming the object of Desire without prescribing it and thus subsuming it back under the ontological domain of Law, as this would be to negate Desire, and with it the possibility of politics. With genericity being closely associated to universality in Badiou's work, the latter therefore contributes a great deal to developing the notion of "surplus" or "excess" in both Rancière and Žižek. It also points more resolutely than does Rancière to the designation of politics proper as the moment of institution of an entirely new conception of the social totality. Or, as Žižek puts it: ‘…[A]uthentic politics…is the art of the impossible – it changes the very parameters of what is considered "possible" in the existing constellation'; hence also, for Žižek, its inherently antagonistic dimension.

The figure of excess fulfils a different purpose in Mouffe's theory of the political, which rests heavily on her and Laclau's notion of hegemony. According to Dikec, hegemony in Laclau and Mouffe's image presupposes the impossibility of 'a totally sutured society, or, in other words, a total closure of the social'. This is because hegemony is possible only through antagonism; and antagonism, in turn, can exist only through lack or surplus: consensus, in this view, is never a complete closure; rather, it only ever exists as the ‘temporary result of a provisional hegemony’. Insofar as it rests on an assertion of the impossibility of saturation, Mouffe's critique of post-politics therefore displays some commonality with those of Rancière, Badiou and Žižek. Mouffe's resistance to saturation, however, is explained by her post-structuralist politico-theoretical persuasion and its attendant anti-essentialism. In this respect, her theory of the political differs widely from the above-mentioned philosophers, all of whom, while inspired in various ways by it, are careful to distance themselves from post-structuralist thought, not least on account of the contribution it has in their eyes made to the consolidation of the post-political Zeitgeist. It also explains the absence of the universalist gesture in Mouffe. Indeed, as explained above, the political is the struggle for hegemonic control over the particular content that is to stand-in for the Universal. An authentic universality is therefore impossible.

==== Saturation and post-politics ====
The present conjuncture is characterised as post-political not insofar as it denies equality: on the contrary in the advanced liberal democracies that are the heartlands of post-politics, formal equality is declared triumphant, leaving only the "perfection" of democracy via more participative, deliberative mechanisms. Rather, from the philosophical perspective outlined above, post-politics is characterised as such insofar as its insistence on saturation and its denial of excess are particularly strong. Thus, under the present, liberal democratic conjuncture, the drive towards the democratic inclusion of all has particularly suturing effects. Meanwhile, the insistence on the achievement of formal equality is especially ignorant to the fact of "surplus". Despite the concerted strategies of consensual incorporation or exclusion directed at it, the persistence of "surplus" is clearly evidenced in the present period: firstly in the deepening of real-world, material inequalities and secondly in those properly political gestures that resist the conditional nature of (post-)democratic participation: that is, that resist accession to the post-political consensus.

== Post-politics and the environment ==
As both Žižek and Badiou explicitly recognise, the post-political scenario is particularly well-advanced in the ecological sphere. Following this cue, environmental geographer Erik Swyngedouw has led an emerging literature that identifies within environmental politics many of the classic symptoms of the post-political condition.

=== Symptoms of the post-political condition exemplified in environmental politics ===
==== Post-ideological consensus ====
As noted above, the post-political configuration is characterised by the disciplining role of consensus. With the market and the liberal state as it organising principles, the present global "meta-level" consensus has taken cosmopolitanism and humanitarianism as the central and uncontestable tenets of its corresponding moral (rather than political) value system. In the nearly twenty years since the Rio Earth Summit (1992), sustainability has not only established itself as an additional tenet of this moral order. In so doing, it has also stepped in as one of the primary post-ideological "ideologies" of the present age: as Swyngedouw notes, as a concept sustainability is so devoid of properly political content that it is impossible to disagree with its objectives.

Swyngedouw's analysis of the particular representation of nature called forth by sustainability discourse explains why this is so. He argues that the nature that enters political debate via sustainability discourse is a radically conservative and reactionary one that posits a singular, ontologically stable and harmonious Nature thrown "out of synch" by human intervention. In denying the plurality, complexity and unpredictability of actually existing natures, sustainability "codes" nature in such a way as to pose status quo (read market-based) solutions that side-step debate over the properly political question of what kind of socio-environmental futures we wish to inhabit.

==== Managerialism and technocracy ====
The post-political condition is characterised by the rise of experts. Although certainly exercised in a democratic fashion (i.e. via the deliberative engagement described by Giddens' social reflexivity thesis (see above)), expert adjudication nonetheless comes to substitute properly political debate.

This trend is particularly visible in the environmental sphere. According to Gert Goeminne and Karen François, more concerning still than the increasing "colonisation" of this sphere by science is that it is a radically depoliticised version of science that is doing the colonising. Drawing heavily from Bruno Latour, Goeminne and François' work serves to problematise the representational work done by science: science is neither a neutral conductor of material reality that produces "facts", nor should its legitimacy to speak on behalf of nature escape scrutiny. By contrast, ‘…the fact-value divide of the Modern Constitution acts to obscure the work of composition that goes into the construction of a matter of fact’, thus giving way to the post-political configuration, in which politics is reduced to 'the administration and management of processes whose parameters are defined by consensual socio-scientific knowledges'. In environmental politics, then, 'disagreement is allowed, but only with respect to the choice of technologies, the mix of organisational fixes, the details of the managerial adjustments, and the urgency of the timing and implementation'. Regarding global climate adaptation and mitigation, that debate over climate scientists' varying interpretations of crucial tipping points diverts attention from questions of "climate justice" is a case in point. Building upon this argument, Goossens, Oosterlynck, and Bradt demonstrate how such form of environmental politics may ultimately displace and disqualify those who dare to question exactly that which cannot be questioned.

The technocratic, "post-democratic" tendency ushered in with the neoliberal transition towards governance-beyond-the-state (henceforth governance) has therefore been reinforced by consensus politics. And as the environmental sphere has been a particularly privileged site for experimentation in neoliberal governance, so too is it particularly vulnerable to the post-political tendency. The neoliberal shift in environmental policy implementation was signalled in the 1990s by the growing influence of New Public Management (NPM) and increasing preference for new environmental policy instruments (NEPIs). Meanwhile, one need only point to the predominance of quantitative measures such as Cost Benefit Analysis (CBA) or the vast regulatory apparatuses associated with the new and burgeoning carbon markets as evidence of what Mitchell Dean has labelled "post-democratic" concern with metricisation, accountancy, auditing and benchmarking.

Alongside this latter concern, Dean, along with Barbara Cruikshank, also associates the "post-democratic" turn with a series of new "technologies of citizenship". As forms of biopower, these latter work to increasingly displace 'regulatory competence' onto the morally responsible, autonomous subject that the state increasingly seeks to forge.

==== Politics as the negotiation of particular interests ====
As both Žižek and Rancière argue, under post-politics the political claims of particular groups are denied their potentially universal character. Oosterlynk and Swyngedouw's application of the post-political critique to the dispute over noise pollution associated with Brussels airport is a classic example: the geographically differentiated impact of noise pollution was used to pit residents’ associations against one another, precluding the potential that a universal claim against the global "just-in-time" economy (the ultimate source of increased flights) be articulated.

==== Populism and the resurgence of the properly political ====
Populism, as the residue of the properly political, is the ultimate symptom of the post-political condition. Firstly, the post-political consensus itself tends towards populist gestures as a substitute for the properly political. Secondly, popular frustration with the confines of consensual politics inevitably gives way to alternatives that, faced with the depoliticising strategies of the consensual order, often take a populist form.

One of the most characteristic features of populism is its invocation of a common, external threat or enemy. The homogenising, unifying effect of this invocation is what produces the mythical – but more importantly reactionary and invariably exclusionary – notion of "the people" that is so central to the populist gesture. Swyngedouw shows that in climate politics "the people" becomes a united "humanity" facing a common predicament, regardless of the differentiated responsibility for and capacity to respond to anthropogenic climate change. Following other scholars who have analysed the alarmist tone of climate discourse, Swyngedouw also underlines that the millenarian, apocalyptic imaginaries called forth by the latter create an external threat, while also giving way to an elite-led, almost crusade-like action (the latter being a further classic feature of populism). The environmental consensus therefore entails a populist dimension.

Meanwhile, as Žižek has shown, disaffection with the consensus tends to favour Far Right movements, whose populist tactics respond to the same need to substitute the properly political described above; and whose violent gestures mimic the properly political impetus towards antagonism. On the other hand, properly political claims that resist both consensual strategies of incorporation and what Žižek has called "the populist temptation" are made audible only as violent or fanatical outbursts. In the environmental arena, media coverage of "resource wars" is a prime example of disputes that may well have a properly political dimension (though may not, of course, necessarily be progressive or without populist dimensions, of course) being neutralised in this way.

== See also ==
- Cartel party theory
- Politicisation

== Sources ==
- Beveridge, Ross (2017). "The (Ontological) Politics in Depoliticisation Debates: Three Lenses on the Decline of the Political" (PDF). Political Studies Review. 15 (4): 589–600. doi:10.1177/1478929916664358. ISSN 1478-9299.
- von Busch, Otto; Palmås, Karl (2022-12-12). "Betrayal: Post-political participation". The Corruption of Co-Design: Political and Social Conflicts in Participatory Design Thinking. New York: Routledge. doi:10.4324/9781003281443-3. ISBN 978-1-003-28144-3.
- van Eeden, Pepijn (2019). "Discover, Instrumentalize, Monopolize: Fidesz's Three-Step Blueprint for a Populist Take-over of Referendums". East European Politics and Societies: And Cultures. 33 (3): 705–732. doi:10.1177/0888325418800548. ISSN 0888-3254.
- Fawcett, P.; Flinders, M.V.; Hay, C.; Wood, M. (2017). Anti-politics, Depoliticization, and Governance. Oxford University Press. ISBN 978-0-19-874897-7.
- Flinders, Matthew; Buller, Jim (2006). "Depoliticisation: Principles, Tactics and Tools" (PDF). British Politics. 1 (3): 293–318. doi:10.1057/palgrave.bp.4200016. ISSN 1746-918X.
- Hay, Colin (2014). "Depoliticisation as process, governance as practice: what did the 'first wave' get wrong and do we need a 'second wave' to put it right?". Policy & Politics. 42 (2): 293–311. doi:10.1332/030557314X13959960668217. ISSN 0305-5736.
- Scott, Jake Anthony (21 February 2021). "'There Is No Alternative'? The Role of Depoliticisation in the Emergence of Populism" (PDF). Politics. 42 (3). Political Studies Association: 325–339. doi:10.1177/0263395721990279. S2CID 233969506.
- Swyngedouw, Erik; Wilson, Japhy (2014-06-23). "There Is No Alternative". The Post-Political and Its Discontents. Edinburgh University Press. doi:10.1515/9780748682980-017. ISBN 978-0-7486-8298-0.
- Wiesner, Claudia, ed. (2021). Rethinking Politicisation in Politics, Sociology and International Relations. Palgrave Studies in European Political Sociology. Basingstoke: Palgrave Macmillan. doi:10.1007/978-3-030-54545-1. ISBN 978-3-030-54545-1. S2CID 241302402.
- Wilson, Japhy; Swyngedouw, Erik (2014-07-30). "Seeds of Dystopia: Post-Politics and the Return of the Political". The Post-Political and Its Discontents. Edinburgh University Press. doi:10.3366/edinburgh/9780748682973.003.0001. ISBN 978-0-7486-8297-3.
