= Cartel party theory =

Political science theory of political parties

In politics, a cartel party or cartel political party is a party which uses the resources of the state to maintain its position within the political system, colluding with other parties in a way similar to a cartel. The premise is that the parties do not compete with one another (being "post-political"), but rather collude to protect their collective interests and keep small outsider parties from being viable.

Richard Katz and Peter Mair argue that "parties in Western Europe have adapted themselves to declining levels of participation and involvement in party activities by not only turning to resources provided by the state but by doing so in a collusive manner".

== Concept ==
The concept of the cartel party was first proposed in 1992 as a means of drawing attention to the patterns of inter-party collusion or cooperation rather than competition; and as a way of emphasising the influence of the state on party development. In definitional terms, the cartel party is a type of party that emerges in advanced democratic polities and that is characterised by the interpenetration of party and state and by a pattern of inter-party collusion. With the development of the cartel party, the goals of politics become self-referential, professional and technocratic, and what little inter-party competition remains becomes focused on the efficient and effective management of the polity. The election campaigns that are conducted by cartel parties are capital-intensive, professionalized and centralized, and are organized on the basis of a strong reliance on the state for financial subventions, subsidies, and for other benefits and privileges. In Austria, for example, public funding of political parties in 2014 amounted to about 42.7 million euros.

Within the party, the distinction between party members and non-members becomes blurred, in that through primaries, electronic polling, and so on, the parties invite all of their supporters, members or not, to participate in party activities and decision-making. Above all, with the emergence of cartel parties, politics becomes increasingly depoliticised.

== Contrast with mass parties ==
The cartel party is contrasted with the traditional view of the mass party, where political parties organize around the issues of large numbers of people. Mass parties are often linked to specific groups with specific policy needs and compete in elections to advance their constituents needs. Mass parties traditionally had little formal support from the government and were largely financed and organized from civil society. In Western Europe the growth of socialist parties in the 19th and early 20th century are traditionally linked to the growth of mass parties, who emerged in working class communities to advance issues like universal suffrage and labor reform.

== Reasons for growth ==
=== Decline of mass parties ===
The mass party as an organizational model declined in many countries in the later 20th century due to political parties' gradual moderation of policy ideas and breakdown of traditional group identities. Party membership has been in decline in many democracies, which has led to a decline in financial and personal investment in parties from the electorate.

=== Political campaigning ===
To compensate for decline in popular support, parties have turned to larger and more expensive political campaigns. Parties have turned to increasingly expensive forms of campaigning that rely on large amounts of public subsidies and outside political contributions.

== See also ==
- Party of power
- Ruling party
- Dominant-party system
- Non-partisan democracy
- Cordon sanitaire (politics)
- Uniparty
