= Weston-super-Mare by-election =

Weston-super-Mare by-election may refer to:

- 1934 Weston-super-Mare by-election
- 1958 Weston-super-Mare by-election
- 1969 Weston-super-Mare by-election
