= Henry Folliott Scott-Stokes =

Henry Folliott Scott-Stokes (13 October 1896 – 19 January 1976) was an English businessman and writer.

== Life ==
Scott-Stokes was educated at Winchester College and New College, Oxford, where he came to know the economist Roy Harrod. In 1921 he married Mary Elizabeth Morland, daughter of John Morland, the Quaker founder of Morlands of Glastonbury, a sheepskin garments and footwear manufacturer. He moved to Glastonbury and worked for his father-in-law's business, becoming managing director. In 1928 he collaborated with J. Colby Morland on 'The Security of the Worker', a paper delivered to the conference of Quaker Employers.

Scott-Stokes contested Weston-super-Mare as a Liberal candidate in the 1934 by-election, and the 1935 general election.

Scott-Stokes was mayor of Glastonbury six times, the founder president of Glastonbury Conservation Society and the first Freeman of Glastonbury. In 1952 he turned down the offer of an OBE. He died on 19 January 1976.

== Works ==
- Perseus; or, Of dragons, London: Kegan Paul, 1924. To-day and To-morrow series.
- (tr.) Glastonbury Abbey before the conquest by William of Malmesbury. Translated from the Latin De antiquitate Glastoniensis ecclesie [On the antiquity of the Church of Glastonbury]. Glastonbury: Central Somerset Gazette, 1932
- (tr.) Glastonbury Abbey during the crusades by Adam of Domerham. Translated from the Latin. London: Folk Press Ltd., 1934. The Somerset folk series, no. 28.
