= Jerry Wiggin =

British politician

Sir Jerry Wiggin

Member of Parliament for Weston-super-Mare
- In office 27 March 1969 – 8 April 1997
- Preceded by: David Webster
- Succeeded by: Brian Cotter

Personal details
- Born: Alfred William Wiggin; 24 February 1937
- Died: 12 March 2015 (aged 78)
- Party: Conservative
- Children: 3, including Bill

Sir Alfred William Wiggin TD (24 February 1937 – 12 March 2015), known as Jerry Wiggin, was a British Conservative Party politician.

== Early life ==
Alfred William "Jerry" Wiggin was born in Worcester, England, on 24 February 1937, the son of Colonel Sir William Wiggin KCB, DSO and Bar, who had led the charge against the Ottoman forces at the Battle of Huj in 1917 (the last British cavalry charge against enemy guns). Jerry Wiggin was educated at Eton College, followed by Trinity College, Cambridge. He left Cambridge without a degree and became a farmer in Clevelode in his native Worcestershire, as well as in Peeblesshire. Though he was not involved in student politics at Cambridge, Wiggin joined the Young Conservatives in 1955. He also served in the Territorial Army, rising to the rank of major in the Royal Yeomanry after his election to Parliament.

== Parliamentary career ==
Wiggin contested the Montgomeryshire constituency in the 1964 and 1966 general elections, losing to incumbent Liberal MP Emlyn Hooson on both occasions. Wiggin became Member of Parliament (MP) for Weston-super-Mare in the 1969 by-election after the death of David Webster. He defeated Tom King in the Conservative selection contest for the by-election. Once elected, Wiggin quickly gained a reputation at Westminster for his enthusiastic promotion of the Armed Forces and for his right-wing views. He was a member of the Monday Club until 1971 and a lifelong supporter of capital punishment. He was also one of the early defenders of the Rhodesian leader Ian Smith. In 1986, when Foreign Office minister Lynda Chalker reported to the Commons on a meeting with Oliver Tambo, acting head of the ANC, Wiggin accused her of "treating with terrorists". Later, as a former chairman of the British Shooting Sports Council, Wiggin was prominent in the campaign against the tighter controls on guns introduced in the wake of the Dunblane school massacre in 1996. Conversely, Wiggin held some views at odds with the traditional Conservative right—he was an early crusader for compulsory seat belts; he opposed efforts to tighten the rules on abortion; and he later supported embryonic research.

During the Heath administration of 1970–74, Wiggin served as a parliamentary private secretary at the Ministry of Defence and the Foreign Office. In 1979, Margaret Thatcher appointed him as a junior minister at the Ministry of Agriculture, Fisheries and Food. Wiggin was then a junior Armed Forces minister from 1981 to 1983 and defended the withdrawal of HMS Endurance from the South Atlantic which, according to The Times, was seen as the trigger for the 1982 Falklands War. Thatcher sacked Wiggin in the aftermath of the war—Wiggin was "blubbing and pleading" with Thatcher to keep his job, according to Alan Clark.

As a farmer, Wiggin played an active role in rural issues in Parliament. He campaigned for subsidies for knackermen to remove fallen farm animals, and for farmers to be exempt from moving badger setts. He opposed dog registration. In 1987 Wiggin became chairman of the Commons select committee on agriculture. In the aftermath of the salmonella scare in 1989, he compelled Edwina Currie to explain her comments regarding salmonella to the committee—Currie had recently resigned as junior health minister after claiming that most egg production in Britain was infected with salmonella. Wiggin said that egg consumers had been left "bemused, confused and frightened by her remarks". In 1989 he founded Sane Planning, a pressure group fighting rural development.

Wiggin was criticised by Private Eye for taking frequent foreign trips, with the magazine dubbing him "Junket Jerry". In May 1995, while Wiggin was in South Africa, it was revealed that he had tabled amendments to a bill in Standing Committee in the name of fellow MP Sebastian Coe, but without Coe's knowledge or consent. The amendment—to safeguard gas supplies to caravan sites—benefited a lobbying group which employed Wiggin as a consultant. His behaviour which meant he avoided having to declare a financial interest upset MPs of both main parties and became known as the cash for amendments scandal, part of the wider "sleaze" scandals of the Conservative government of the mid-1990s. Wiggin was compelled to apologise to the House of Commons for his actions. William Rees-Mogg nonetheless described Wiggin as "a shrewd politician—though perhaps closer to the intellectual tone of the rugby XV than of All Souls".

Wiggin was knighted in the 1993 New Years Honours List. He retired at the 1997 general election, during which the Conservatives lost his Weston-super-Mare seat to Brian Cotter of the Liberal Democrats.

== Family and death ==
Wiggin married Rosemary Orr in 1964, with whom he had two sons and a daughter. They divorced in 1983, and in 1991 he married Morella Bulmer. One of his sons from his first marriage is Bill Wiggin, Conservative MP from 2001 to 2024 for Leominster and, following boundary reorganisation, North Herefordshire.

Wiggin died suddenly on 12 March 2015, aged 78.

== Arms ==
Coat of arms of Jerry Wiggin

Motto
To Thine Own Self Be True

== See also ==
- Wiggin baronets

Parliament of the United Kingdom
Preceded by David Webster	Member of Parliament for Weston-super-Mare; 1969–1997	Succeeded by Brian Cotter
