= Old Hills =

Area of common land in Worcestershire, England

Coordinates: 52.13682°N 2.25542°W

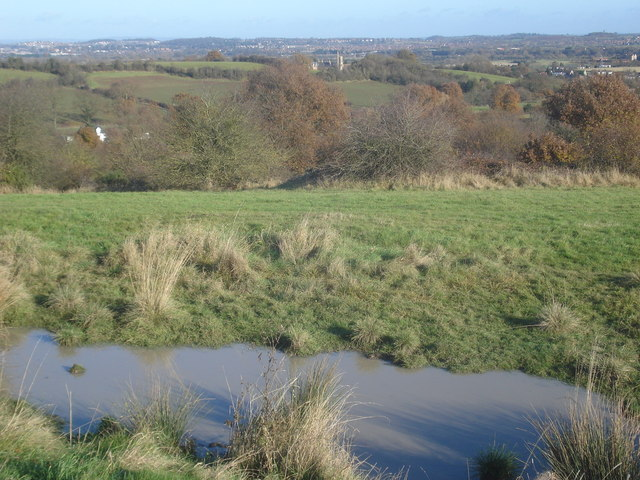
Pond at the Old Hills

The Old Hills are an area of common land in Worcestershire, England. They are located around two miles to the east of Great Malvern and about a mile west of the River Severn near the village of Callow End. They reach a height of 65 metres (considerably lower than the nearby Malvern Hills) but are popular with walkers for their views towards Malvern.

The country house St Cloud, now the Severn Heights Nursing Home, was the home of the Bromley-Martin family.
