= Clevelode =

Village in Worcestershire, England

Coordinates: 52.123095°N 2.254601°W

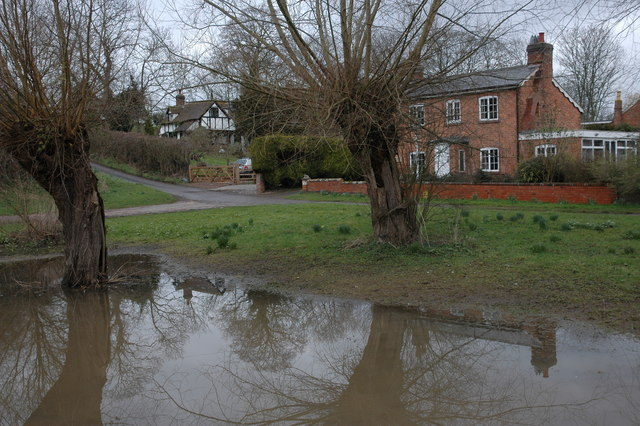

- Location within Worcestershire
- District: Malvern Hills
- Shire county: Worcestershire
- Region: West Midlands
- Country: England
- Sovereign state: United Kingdom
- Police: West Mercia
- Fire: Hereford and Worcester
- Ambulance: West Midlands

Clevelode is a small village in Worcestershire, England. It is located around 5 miles south of Worcester just to the west of the River Severn. Clevelode is next to the B4244 between Callow End and Hanley Castle in the civil parish of Powick. In 2021, the parish of Powick recorded a population of 3,463. A caravan park and bed and breakfast are located just south of Clevelode.
