= Weston-super-Mare (constituency) =

Parliamentary constituency in the United Kingdom, 1918 onwards

- County constituency for the House of Commons
- Interactive map of boundaries since 2024
- Boundary of Weston-super-Mare in South West England
- County: Somerset
- Electorate: 70,722 (2023)
- Major settlements: Weston-super-Mare

Current constituency
- Created: 1918
- Member of Parliament: Dan Aldridge (Labour)
- Seats: One
- Created from: part North Somerset, part Wells

Weston-super-Mare is a constituency (Note: A county constituency (for the purposes of election expenses and type of returning officer)) represented in the House of Commons of the UK Parliament by Dan Aldridge from the Labour Party since 2024. Before then it was held since 2005 by John Penrose, a Conservative. (Note: As with all constituencies, the constituency elects one Member of Parliament (MP) by the first past the post system of election at least every five years.)

== History ==
The seat was created under the Representation of the People Act 1918. Its forerunner was the North Somerset division created in 1885.

The by-election of 1934 was triggered by the acceptance of the appointment of Lord Erskine to the position of Governor of Madras Presidency, that of 1958 by the death of Ian Orr-Ewing and that of 1969 by the death of David Webster.

Political history

The seat has alternated in representation between 1992 and 2005: in the election of 1997 the fresh Conservative candidate, Margaret Daly failed to hold the seat which led to Weston Super Mare's first marginal majority since 1923, obtained by Brian Cotter, a Liberal Democrat. Between 1997 and 2010, all the majorities in the constituency were lower than 3,000 votes, remaining strongly marginal and seeing in 2005 Cotter lose the seat to John Penrose. Following the 2015 election however, the seat moved strongly towards the Conservatives, who increased their share of the vote in every subsequent election until 2019 election, when Penrose gained a majority of 17,121 over the second place Labour candidate. Penrose subsequently lost the seat to Labour's Dan Aldridge in 2024.

Frontbenchers

- Jerry Wiggin was Minister for the Armed Services from 1981 to 1983.
- Brian Cotter was the Liberal Democrat Small Business Spokesman (1997–2005),
- John Penrose was appointed the Minister for Tourism and Heritage (2010–2012).

== Boundaries ==
Map of boundaries 2010-2024

1918–1950: The Urban Districts of Clevedon, Portishead, and Weston-super-Mare, and the Rural Districts of Axbridge and Long Ashton.

1950–1983: The Borough of Weston-super-Mare, the Urban District of Clevedon, the Rural District of Axbridge, and in the Rural District of Long Ashton the parishes of Kenn, Kingston Seymour, and Yatton.

1983–1997: The District of Woodspring wards of Banwell, Blagdon, Churchill, Congresbury, Hutton, Locking, Weston-super-Mare Ashcombe, Weston-super-Mare East, Weston-super-Mare Ellenborough, Weston-super-Mare North, Weston-super-Mare South, Weston-super-Mare Uphill, Weston-super-Mare West, Winscombe, Wrington, and Yatton.

1997–2010: The District of North Somerset wards of Banwell, Blagdon, Churchill, Congresbury, Hutton, Locking, Weston-super-Mare Ashcombe, Weston-super-Mare East, Weston-super-Mare Ellenborough, Weston-super-Mare North, Weston-super-Mare South, Weston-super-Mare Uphill, Weston-super-Mare West, and Winscombe.

2010–2024: The District of North Somerset wards of Banwell and Winscombe, Blagdon and Churchill, Congresbury, Hutton and Locking, Kewstoke, Weston-super-Mare Central, Weston-super-Mare Clarence and Uphill, Weston-super-Mare East, Weston-super-Mare Milton and Old Worle, Weston-super-Mare North Worle, Weston-super-Mare South, Weston-super-Mare South Worle, and Weston-super-Mare West.

2024–present: The District of North Somerset wards of: Hutton & Locking; Weston-super-Mare Central; Weston-super-Mare Hillside; Weston-super-Mare Kewstoke; Weston-super-Mare Mid Worle; Weston-super-Mare Milton; Weston-super-Mare North Worle; Weston-super-Mare South; Weston-super-Mare South Worle; Weston-super-Mare Uphill; Weston-super-Mare Winterstoke; Wick St. Lawrence & St. Georges.

Further to the completion of the 2023 Periodic Review of Westminster constituencies, the seat was subject to moderate boundary changes to bring the electorate within the permitted range. This involved the loss of rural areas to the east of Weston-super-Mare, including the villages of Banwell, Blagdon, Churchill, Congresbury, Puxton and Winscombe, which were transferred to the new constituency of Wells and Mendip Hills, first contested at the 2024 general election.

The constituency now consists largely of the town of Weston-super-Mare on the Bristol Channel, part of the North Somerset Unitary Authority.

=== History of boundaries ===
Changes for 1950

Under the first periodic review the Weston constituency lost the Urban District of Portishead, and most of the Rural District of Long Ashton (excepting the parishes of Kenn, Kingston Seymour, and Yatton) to North Somerset constituency.

Changes for 1983

Under the third periodic review the Weston constituency lost Clevedon to Woodspring constituency, and the parishes now within the Sedgemoor district (under the Local Government Act 1972) to Wells constituency.

Changes for 1997

Under the fourth periodic review the Weston constituency lost Yatton and Wrington to Woodspring constituency.

Changes for 2010

Parliament accepted the Boundary Commission's Fifth Periodic Review of Westminster constituencies by making slight changes to this constituency for the 2010 general election, namely the loss of only 181 electors in Butcombe (in the ward of Wrington, no longer in the seat at all) to North Somerset.

== Constituency profile ==
The town grew as a relatively late-Victorian affluent resort with many green spaces and gardens south of the headland, Sand Point which denotes the sandier beach of the town and of Burnham on Sea relative to northerly shores such as at Clevedon.

Work in tourism and visitor attractions is seasonal but other areas of the economy locally, such as customer services operations, freight, haulage and distribution, social, care, elderly and health services as well as retail, manufacturing and materials/foods processing provide employment. Workless claimants who were registered jobseekers were in November 2012 lower than the national average of 3.8%, at 3.5% of the population based on a statistical compilation by The Guardian.

== Members of Parliament ==
Election	Member	Party
1918	Sir Gilbert Wills	Conservative
1922	Lord Erskine (Note: Heir to the Earl of Mar, however predeceased his father. This title has a subsidiary title gained by one of the clan's forebears, remaining as a courtesy title, Lord Erskine, which attaches to its current holder's eldest son.)	Conservative
1923	Frank Murrell	Liberal
1924	Lord Erskine	Conservative
1934 by-election	Ian Orr-Ewing	Conservative
1958 by-election	David Webster	Conservative
1969 by-election	Jerry Wiggin	Conservative
1997	Brian Cotter	Liberal Democrat
2005	John Penrose	Conservative
2024	Dan Aldridge	Labour

== Elections ==
=== Elections in the 2020s ===
General election 2024: Weston-super-Mare
Party	Candidate	Votes	%	±%
Labour	Dan Aldridge	16,310	38.5	+10.4
Conservative	John Penrose	11,901	28.1	–29.0
Reform	Richard Pearse	7,735	18.2	N/A
Liberal Democrats	Patrick Keating	3,756	8.9	–2.8
Green	Thomas Daw	2,688	6.3	+3.3
Majority		4,409	10.4	N/A
Turnout		42,390	59.4	–5.5
Registered electors		71,396		
Labour gain from Conservative		Swing	▲19.7	

=== Elections in the 2010s ===
2019 notional result
Party	Vote	%
Conservative	26,210	57.1
Labour	12,900	28.1
Liberal Democrats	5,382	11.7
Green	1,380	3.0
Turnout	45,872	64.9
Electorate	70,722	

General election 2019: Weston-super-Mare
Party	Candidate	Votes	%	±%
Conservative	John Penrose	31,983	57.5	+4.4
Labour	Tim Taylor	14,862	26.7	–6.0
Liberal Democrats	Patrick Keating	6,935	12.5	+3.3
Green	Suneil Basu	1,834	3.3	+1.7
Majority		17,121	30.8	+10.4
Turnout		55,614	67.4	–1.3
Conservative hold		Swing	+5.2	

General election 2017: Weston-super-Mare
Party	Candidate	Votes	%	±%
Conservative	John Penrose	29,982	53.1	+5.1
Labour	Tim Taylor	18,438	32.7	+14.4
Liberal Democrats	Mike Bell	5,175	9.2	–1.2
UKIP	Helen Hims	1,932	3.4	–14.4
Green	Suneil Basu	888	1.6	–3.3
Majority		11,544	20.4	–9.3
Turnout		56,415	68.7	+2.7
Conservative hold		Swing	–4.6	

General election 2015: Weston-super-Mare
Party	Candidate	Votes	%	±%
Conservative	John Penrose	25,203	48.0	+3.7
Labour	Tim Taylor	9,594	18.3	+7.4
UKIP	Ernie Warrender	9,366	17.8	+15.1
Liberal Democrats	John Munro	5,486	10.4	–28.8
Green	Richard Lawson	2,592	4.9	New
English Democrat	Ronald Lavelle	311	0.6	+0.1
Majority		15,609	29.7	+24.6
Turnout		52,552	66.0	–1.2
Conservative hold		Swing		

General election 2010: Weston-super-Mare
Party	Candidate	Votes	%	±%
Conservative	John Penrose	23,356	44.3	+4.0
Liberal Democrats	Mike Bell	20,665	39.2	+3.1
Labour	David Bradley	5,772	10.9	–7.8
UKIP	Paul Spencer	1,406	2.7	+0.2
BNP	Peryn Parsons	1,098	2.1	+0.5
English Democrat	John Peverelle	275	0.5	New
Independent	Steve Satch	144	0.3	New
Majority		2,691	5.1	+0.9
Turnout		52,716	67.2	+1.7
Conservative hold		Swing	+0.4	

=== Elections in the 2000s ===
General election 2005: Weston-super-Mare
Party	Candidate	Votes	%	±%
Conservative	John Penrose	19,804	40.3	+1.6
Liberal Democrats	Brian Cotter	17,725	36.1	−3.4
Labour	Damien Egan	9,169	18.7	−1.1
UKIP	Paul Spencer	1,207	2.5	+1.1
BNP	Clive Courtney	778	1.6	New
Independent	William Human	225	0.5	New
Demanding Honesty in Politics and Whitehall	Paul Hemingway-Arnold	187	0.4	New
Majority		2,079	4.2	N/A
Turnout		49,095	65.5	+2.7
Conservative gain from Liberal Democrats		Swing	+2.5	

General election 2001: Weston-super-Mare
Party	Candidate	Votes	%	±%
Liberal Democrats	Brian Cotter	18,424	39.5	–0.6
Conservative	John Penrose	18,086	38.7	+1.0
Labour	Derek Kraft	9,235	19.8	+1.9
UKIP	Bill Lukins	650	1.4	New
Independent	John Peverelle	206	0.4	New
Independent	Richard Sibley	79	0.2	New
Majority		338	0.8	–1.6
Turnout		46,680	62.8	–10.9
Liberal Democrats hold		Swing	–0.8	

=== Elections in the 1990s ===
General election 1997: Weston-super-Mare
Party	Candidate	Votes	%	±%
Liberal Democrats	Brian Cotter	21,407	40.1	+0.8
Conservative	Margaret Daly	20,133	37.7	−10.0
Labour	Derek Kraft	9,557	17.9	+6.9
Referendum	Tom Sewell	2,280	4.3	New
Majority		1,274	2.4	N/A
Turnout		53,377	73.7	−6.0
Liberal Democrats gain from Conservative		Swing	+5.44	

General election 1992: Weston-super-Mare
Party	Candidate	Votes	%	±%
Conservative	Jerry Wiggin	30,022	47.7	−1.7
Liberal Democrats	Brian Cotter	24,680	39.3	+3.7
Labour	David Murray	6,913	11.0	−0.4
Green	Richard Lawson	1,262	2.0	−1.6
Majority		5,342	8.4	−5.4
Turnout		62,877	79.7	+4.0
Conservative hold		Swing	−2.7	

=== Elections in the 1980s ===
General election 1987: Weston-super-Mare
Party	Candidate	Votes	%	±%
Conservative	Jerry Wiggin	28,547	49.4	−4.2
SDP	John Crockford-Hawley	20,549	35.6	+0.2
Labour Co-op	Paul Loach	6,584	11.4	+0.3
Green	Richard Lawson	2,067	3.6	New
Majority		7,998	13.8	−4.4
Turnout		57,747	75.7	+2.6
Conservative hold		Swing		

General election 1983: Weston-super-Mare
Party	Candidate	Votes	%	±%
Conservative	Jerry Wiggin	27,948	53.6	
SDP	Jonathan Marks	18,457	35.4	
Labour	Roger Berry	5,781	11.1	
Majority		9,491	18.2	
Turnout		52,186	73.1	
Conservative hold		Swing		

=== Elections in the 1970s ===
General election 1979: Weston-super-Mare
Party	Candidate	Votes	%	±%
Conservative	Jerry Wiggin	40,618	56.9	+8.1
Liberal	Rowland Morgan	16,305	22.9	−5.7
Labour Co-op	Alan Taylor	14,420	20.2	−1.9
Majority		24,313	34.0	+13.8
Turnout		71,343	77.5	+2.7
Conservative hold		Swing		

General election October 1974: Weston-super-Mare
Party	Candidate	Votes	%	±%
Conservative	Jerry Wiggin	31,028	48.8	−1.2
Liberal	Roger Miller	18,169	28.6	−1.3
Labour Co-op	Peter Owen	14,057	22.1	+2.1
United Democratic	Eric Iszatt	296	0.5	New
Majority		12,859	20.2	+0.1
Turnout		63,550	74.8	−5.3
Conservative hold		Swing		

General election February 1974: Weston-super-Mare
Party	Candidate	Votes	%	±%
Conservative	Jerry Wiggin	33,838	50.0	−7.9
Liberal	Philip Golding	20,237	29.9	+12.6
Labour Co-op	Roy Morris	13,542	20.0	−4.8
Majority		13,601	20.1	−13.0
Turnout		67,617	80.1	+6.4
Conservative hold		Swing		

General election 1970: Weston-super-Mare
Party	Candidate	Votes	%	±%
Conservative	Jerry Wiggin	33,816	57.9	+5.8
Labour	Sarah Palmer	14,473	24.8	−4.0
Liberal	Edward Deal	10,120	17.3	−1.8
Majority		19,343	33.1	+9.8
Turnout		58,409	73.7	−4.8
Conservative hold		Swing		

=== Elections in the 1960s ===
1969 Weston-super-Mare by-election
Party	Candidate	Votes	%	±%
Conservative	Jerry Wiggin	29,211	65.7	+13.6
Liberal	Edward Deal	8,739	19.7	+0.6
Labour	Nicholas Bosanquet	6,504	14.6	−14.2
Majority		20,472	46.0	+22.7
Turnout		44,454	60.8	−17.7
Conservative hold		Swing		

General election 1966: Weston-super-Mare
Party	Candidate	Votes	%	±%
Conservative	David Webster	27,733	52.1	−1.0
Labour Co-op	Melvyn Butcher	15,340	28.8	+4.9
Liberal	Ian McDonald	10,173	19.1	−3.9
Majority		12,393	23.3	−5.9
Turnout		53,246	78.5	−0.5
Conservative hold		Swing		

General election 1964: Weston-super-Mare
Party	Candidate	Votes	%	±%
Conservative	David Webster	27,143	53.1	−4.4
Labour Co-op	Jessie Stephen	12,248	23.9	+1.2
Liberal	Ian McDonald	11,771	23.0	+3.2
Majority		14,895	29.2	−5.6
Turnout		51,162	79.0	−0.7
Conservative hold		Swing		

=== Elections in the 1950s ===
General election 1959: Weston-super-Mare
Party	Candidate	Votes	%	±%
Conservative	David Webster	27,881	57.5	−5.2
Labour	Edward Hampton	10,977	22.7	−14.6
Liberal	Edward Taylor	9,609	19.8	N/A
Majority		16,904	34.8	+9.4
Turnout		48,467	79.7	+5.9
Conservative hold		Swing		

1958 Weston-super-Mare by-election
Party	Candidate	Votes	%	±%
Conservative	David Webster	21,271	49.3	−13.4
Labour	Edward Hampton	11,295	26.2	−11.1
Liberal	Edward Taylor	10,588	24.5	New
Majority		9,976	23.1	−2.3
Turnout		43,154	72.2	−1.6
Conservative hold		Swing		

General election 1955: Weston-super-Mare
Party	Candidate	Votes	%	±%
Conservative	Ian Orr-Ewing	27,357	62.7	−3.0
Labour	Robert Andrews	16,275	37.3	+3.0
Majority		11,082	25.4	−6.0
Turnout		43,632	73.8	−5.9
Conservative hold		Swing		

General election 1951: Weston-super-Mare
Party	Candidate	Votes	%	±%
Conservative	Ian Orr-Ewing	30,485	65.7	+9.3
Labour	Robert Andrews	15,942	34.3	+6.3
Majority		14,543	31.4	−22.2
Turnout		46,427	79.7	−3.4
Conservative hold		Swing		

General election 1950: Weston-super-Mare
Party	Candidate	Votes	%	±%
Conservative	Ian Orr-Ewing	26,767	56.4	
Labour	Michael Hill	13,294	28.0	
Liberal	Frederick Archie Kew	7,394	15.6	
Majority		13,473	53.6	
Turnout		47,455	83.1	
Conservative hold		Swing		

=== Elections in the 1940s ===
General election 1945: Weston-super-Mare
Party	Candidate	Votes	%	±%
Conservative	Ian Orr-Ewing	30,730	49.5	−16.2
Labour	Hugh Cardew	20,542	33.1	+15.4
Liberal	Stanley Sanger	10,804	17.4	−1.3
Majority		10,188	16.4	−30.6
Turnout		62,076	73.7	+7.3
Conservative hold		Swing		

=== Elections in the 1930s ===
General election 1935: Weston-super-Mare
Party	Candidate	Votes	%	±%
Conservative	Ian Orr-Ewing	27,735	65.7	−20.0
Liberal	Henry Scott-Stokes	7,883	18.7	N/A
Labour	George Elvin	6,625	15.7	+1.4
Majority		19,852	47.0	−24.4
Turnout		42,243	66.4	−5.4
Conservative hold		Swing		

1934 Weston-super-Mare by-election
Party	Candidate	Votes	%	±%
Conservative	Ian Orr-Ewing	21,203	61.5	−24.2
Liberal	Henry Scott-Stokes	7,551	21.9	New
Labour	Albert Edward Millett	5,715	16.6	+2.3
Majority		13,652	39.6	−31.8
Turnout		34,469		
Conservative hold		Swing		

General election 1931: Weston-super-Mare
Party	Candidate	Votes	%	±%
Conservative	John Erskine	35,255	85.7	+33.5
Labour	Bernard Craig	5,905	14.3	+3.4
Majority		29,350	71.4	+55.2
Turnout		41,160	71.8	−8.2
Conservative hold		Swing		

=== Elections in the 1920s ===
General election 1929: Weston-super-Mare
Party	Candidate	Votes	%	±%
Unionist	John Erskine	21,898	51.1	−4.7
Liberal	William Morse	16,219	37.8	−2.2
Labour	Constance Elizabeth Borrett	4,766	11.1	+6.9
Majority		5,679	13.3	−2.5
Turnout		42,883	77.8	−2.1
Unionist hold		Swing	-0.3	

General election 1924: Weston-super-Mare
Party	Candidate	Votes	%	±%
Unionist	John Erskine	17,987	55.8	+7.3
Liberal	Frank Murrell	12,895	40.0	−11.5
Labour	Raphael Neft	1,343	4.2	New
Majority		5,092	15.8	N/A
Turnout		32,225	81.7	
Conservative gain from Liberal		Swing		

General election 1923: Weston-super-Mare
Party	Candidate	Votes	%	±%
Liberal	Frank Murrell	15,223	51.5	+6.6
Unionist	John Erskine	14,318	48.5	−6.6
Majority		905	3.0	N/A
Turnout		29,541		
Liberal gain from Unionist		Swing	+6.6	

General election 1922: Weston-super-Mare
Party	Candidate	Votes	%	±%
Unionist	John Erskine	15,552	55.1	−10.4
Liberal	Frank Murrell	12,674	44.9	+10.4
Majority		2,878	10.2	−20.8
Turnout		28,226		
Unionist hold		Swing		

=== Elections in the 1910s ===
General election 1918: Weston-super-Mare
Party		Candidate	Votes	%	±%
C	Unionist	Gilbert Wills	13,494	65.5	
	Liberal	Edmund Thruston	7,104	34.5	
Majority			6,390	31.0	
Turnout			20,598		
	Unionist win (new seat)				
C indicates candidate endorsed by the coalition government.

== See also ==
- List of parliamentary constituencies in Avon

== Sources ==
- The Constitutional Year Book for 1913 (London: National Union of Conservative and Unionist Associations, 1913)
- F W S Craig, British Parliamentary Election Results 1832–1885 (2nd edition, Aldershot: Parliamentary Research Services, 1989)
- Michael Kinnear, The British Voter (London: BH Batsford, Ltd, 1968)
- Henry Pelling, Social Geography of British Elections 1885–1910 (London: Macmillan, 1967)
- Frederic A Youngs, jr, Guide to the Local Administrative Units of England, Vol I (London: Royal Historical Society, 1979)
