= Frank Murrell =

Frank Edric Joseph Murrell (17 March 1874 – 1 April 1931) was a British businessman and Liberal Party politician who sat as Member of Parliament for Weston-super-Mare constituency.

== Background ==
Murrell was born in Tottenham, Middlesex, the son of Capt. Frederick Murrell JP of Barry. He was educated at Lewisham House, Weston-super-Mare. In 1906 he married Mary Gwendoline Howell.

== Professional career ==
Murrell was a businessman with many interests in the printing industry. He co-founded the paper merchant Davies Harvey & Murrell in 1919. He was a Director of Associated Printers, Ltd. He was a liveryman of the Worshipful Company of Stationers and a Freeman of the City of London. He served on the executive of the Federation of Master Printers. He was a Member of the Joint Industrial Council for the Printing and Allied Trades.

== Political career ==
Murrell was elected as a member of Barry Urban District Council and sat from 1908 to 1915.

He was selected to fight the Weston-super-Mare constituency at the 1922 general election. Although listed in contemporary records as a member of the Liberal faction led by H.H. Asquith, he preferred not to be associated with either of the two factions of the Liberal Party. He called himself an 'Independent Liberal' and stated he would work with either faction if in agreement with their policies. He failed to win the seat at the 1922 general election.

The Liberals were reunited at the 1923 general election and Murrell again stood in Weston-super-Mare. He won the seat with a majority of 905 votes, defeating the Conservative MP, Lord Erskine.

In Parliament, he proposed and received a Second Reading on a bill giving to local joint industrial councils, compulsory powers of enforcement of their decisions. The bill did not pass. Subsequently, his industrial proposals were formally taken up by the Liberal Party in their industrial policy programme for the 1929 general election contained in the 'Yellow Book'.

Murrell was heavily defeated at the 1924 general election, with Conservative candidate John Erskine having a majority of 5,092 votes over Murrell and a 4% swing towards the Conservative Party.

He did not stand for parliament again.

=== Electoral record ===
General election 1922: Weston-super-Mare
Party	Candidate	Votes	%	±%
Unionist	John Francis Ashley Erskine, Lord Erskine	15,552	55.1	−10.4
Liberal	Frank Edric Joseph Murrell	12,674	44.9	+10.4
Majority		2,878	10.2	−20.8
Unionist hold		Swing	-10.4	

General election 1923: Weston-super-Mare
Party	Candidate	Votes	%	±%
Liberal	Frank Edric Joseph Murrell	15,223	51.5	+6.6
Unionist	Lord John Erskine	14,318	48.5	−6.6
Majority		905	3.0	13.2
Liberal gain from Unionist		Swing	+6.6	

General election 1924: Weston-super-Mare
Party	Candidate	Votes	%	±%
Unionist	John Francis Ashley Erskine, Lord Erskine	17,987	55.8	+4.3
Liberal	Frank Edric Joseph Murrell	12,895	40.0	−8.5
Labour	Raphael Neft	1,343	4.2	n/a
Majority		5,092	15.8	+12.8
Turnout		32,225	81.7	
Conservative gain from Liberal		Swing	+6.4	

Parliament of the United Kingdom
Preceded by Lord Erskine	Member of Parliament for Weston-super-Mare; 1923–1924	Succeeded by Lord Erskine
