= Powick =

Village near Worcester, England

Coordinates: 52.161267°N 2.2463°W

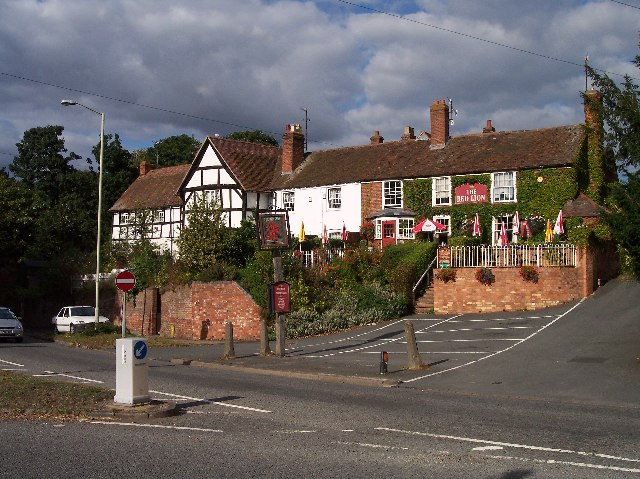
- The Red Lion

- Location within Worcestershire
- Population: 3,463
- OS grid reference: SO833513
- Civil parish: Powick
- District: Malvern Hills
- Shire county: Worcestershire
- Region: West Midlands
- Country: England
- Sovereign state: United Kingdom
- Post town: WORCESTER
- Postcode district: WR2
- Dialling code: 01905
- Police: West Mercia
- Fire: Hereford and Worcester
- Ambulance: West Midlands
- UK Parliament: West Worcestershire

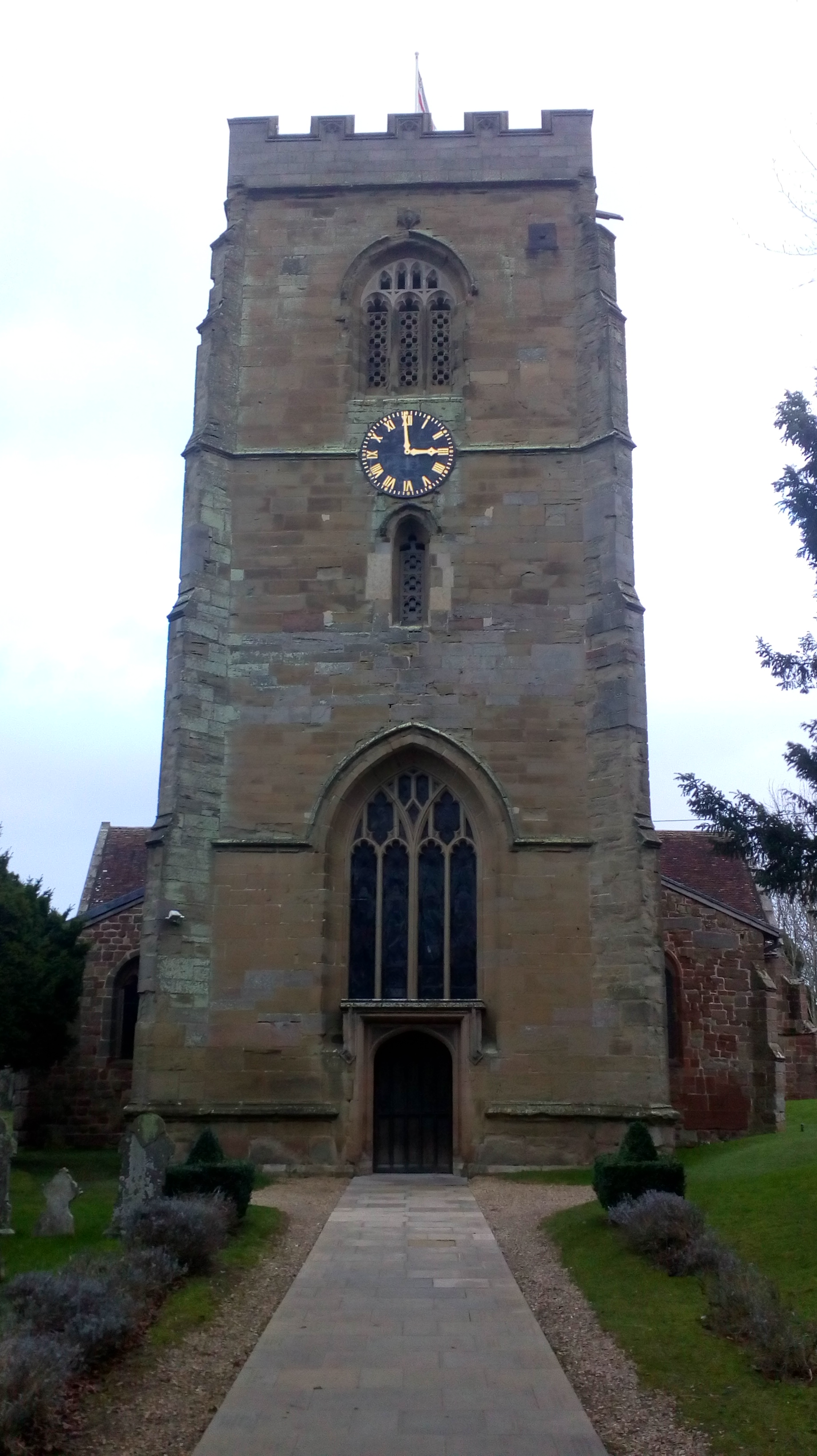
Powick Parish Church, Worcester. The tower is said to be from where Oliver Cromwell observed the Battle of Worcester in 1651 whilst his enemy Charles II of England observed the battle from Worcester Cathedral. During World War II the tower was used by the Home Guard to watch for incoming German bombers heading towards the City of Worcester.

Powick is a village and civil parish in the Malvern Hills district of Worcestershire, England, located two miles south of the city of Worcester and four miles north of Great Malvern. The parish includes the village of Callow End and the hamlets of Bastonford, Clevelode, Collett's Green, and Deblins Green.

Powick lies on the A449 and has two bridges across the River Teme, one ancient and one modern. The village contains a primary school, three pubs - The Crown, The Red Lion and The Three Nuns, a garage and a Chinese restaurant/takeaway. It is locally pronounced "Pow-ick" (the "ow" rhyming with the word "mow").

The civil parish population was 3,463 in 2021.

== History ==
=== Name ===
The name Powick derives from the Old English Pohawīc meaning 'Poha's trading settlement'.

=== Powick Old Bridge ===
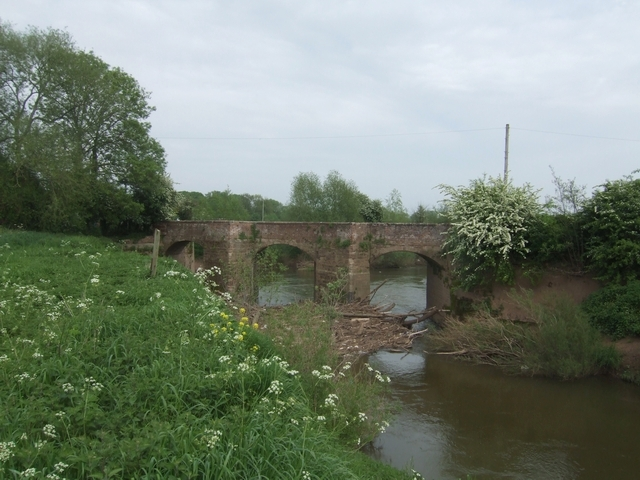
Powick Old Bridge over the River Teme

The old bridge across the Teme at Powick is late mediaeval with 17th-century alterations, built of sandstone with brick parapets. It is a grade I listed scheduled monument.

In 1642 the bridge was the scene of one of the first skirmishes between Royalist and Parliamentarian soldiers in the English Civil War in what became known as the Battle of Powick Bridge. It was a short, sharp, but decisive cavalry engagement that resulted in a victory for the Royalists and showed the Parliamentarian cavalry their shortcomings, setting the tone for the early stages of the conflict. A long ballad gives a surprisingly detailed account of the battle.

The more famous Battle of Worcester later on in the war, in 1651, was fought in part in much the same locality close to the River Teme, when the two northern-piers of the bridge were destroyed by the Royalists. The church in Powick village was used by the Royalists as a lookout point as it commanded elevated views over the surrounding countryside and the bridge and its approaches. Its tower has a lot of pockmarks from small bore cannon balls which were fired by Parliamentarian gunners to deter the Scottish Royalist forces using the tower. They extend up the south face of the tower from as low as head height up to the top.

In late January 2024, the bridge, which is normally open to pedestrians and cyclists, was closed for "the foreseeable future" due to collapse of some structure and foundations, washed away after storms.

=== Powick Hospital ===
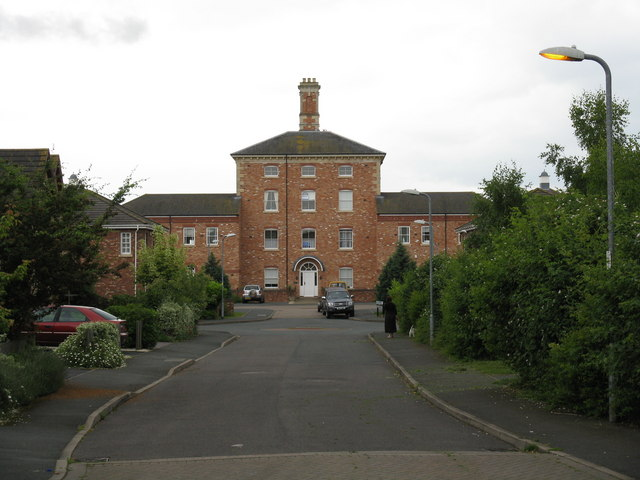
Collett's Green - the former hospital

A mile from the village towards Malvern was the site of the Victorian complex of the county psychiatric hospital, generally referred to as Powick Hospital. The hospital was notorious for its use of LSD in therapy and mistreatment of patients. Built in 1852, the hospital finally closed in 1989 and was mostly demolished shortly thereafter. The name Powick entered the local colloquialisms and became synonymous for mental disorder in many informal expressions relating to madness or stupidity.

Before he became England's most famous composer, in 1879 at the age of 22 Edward Elgar was appointed bandmaster of the asylum until about 1886, and wrote compositions for the asylum's band.

=== Victorian power station ===
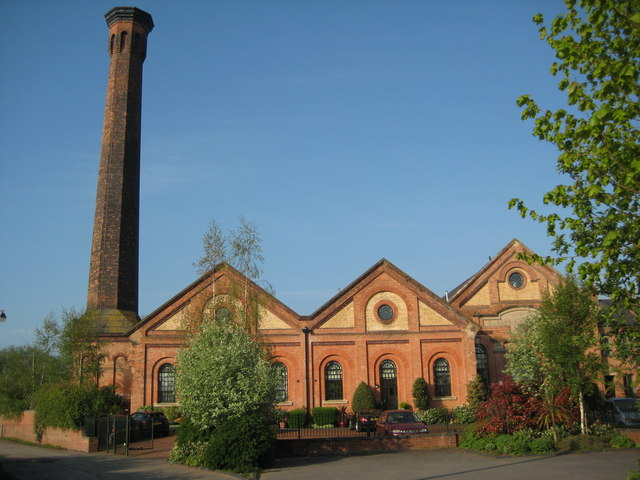
Powick Mill

A former water mill, next to Powick Bridge, was converted in 1894 to become the world's first combined steam/hydro electric power station. Electricity from this mill provided about half the city of Worcester's needs. The Powick site continued generating until the 1950s. When it closed, it was converted into a laundry and has since been converted into residential apartments.

The site was chosen for a mill from at least the 11th century, and very probably earlier than that. A leat was dug in 1291. A succession of water mills replaced each other throughout the Middle Ages and into the 16th century and later. The mill is a Grade II Listed Building.

King (2006) opined that, 'probably in the 1702s', the mill was converted to a finery forge.

Two Welsh historians, John Lloyd (1903) and Theophilus Jones (1909), referred to the local Maybery family in their respective histories of Breconshire and Brecknockshire. Lloyd (1903) described 'Thomas Maybery' and his son 'John Maybery' as having come to Brecon from 'Powicks Forge, in the county of Worcester, Ironmaster' and as being 'born ironmasters'. Jones (1909) erroneously wrote:

'The first Maybery to settle in Breconshire was John Maybery, a pioneer ironmaster of South Wales, who was the son of John [sic] Maybery and Mary his wife; the former was an ironmaster in Worcestershire and lived at Powick Court in that County, the latter (Mary Maybery) in her will, which was in the possession of the late Aveline Maybery, Esq., left a sum of money to the poor of Powick.

== Notable residents ==
- John Wall, physician, was born at Powick in 1708.
- James Piers St Aubyn, architect, was born at Powick Vicarage in 1815
- Lord Alfred Douglas, lover of Oscar Wilde, was born at Ham Hill House in 1870.

== Gallery ==
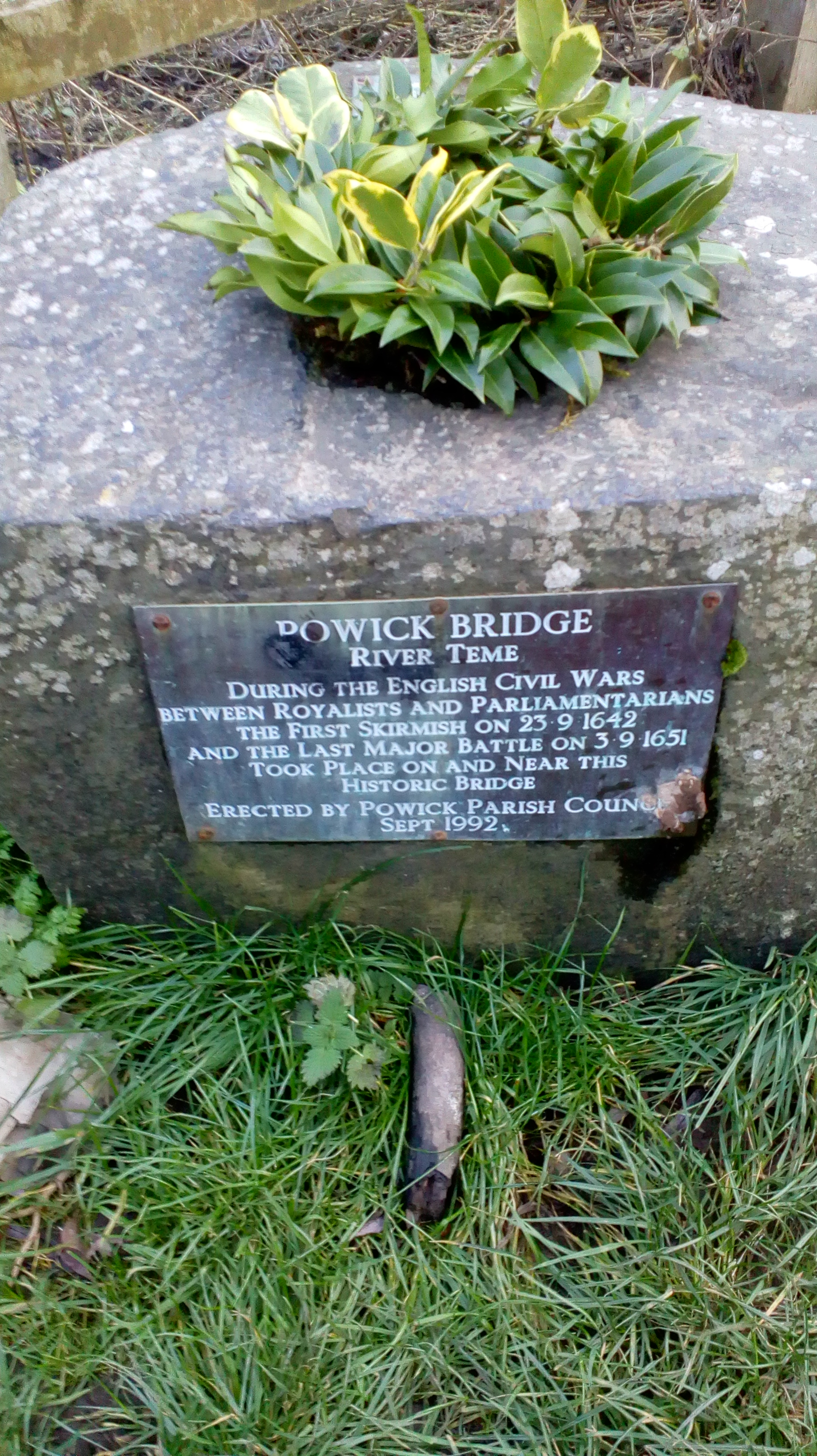
Monument commemorating the Battle of Powick Bridge (1642) and the Battle of Worcester (1651), located on Powick Old Bridge

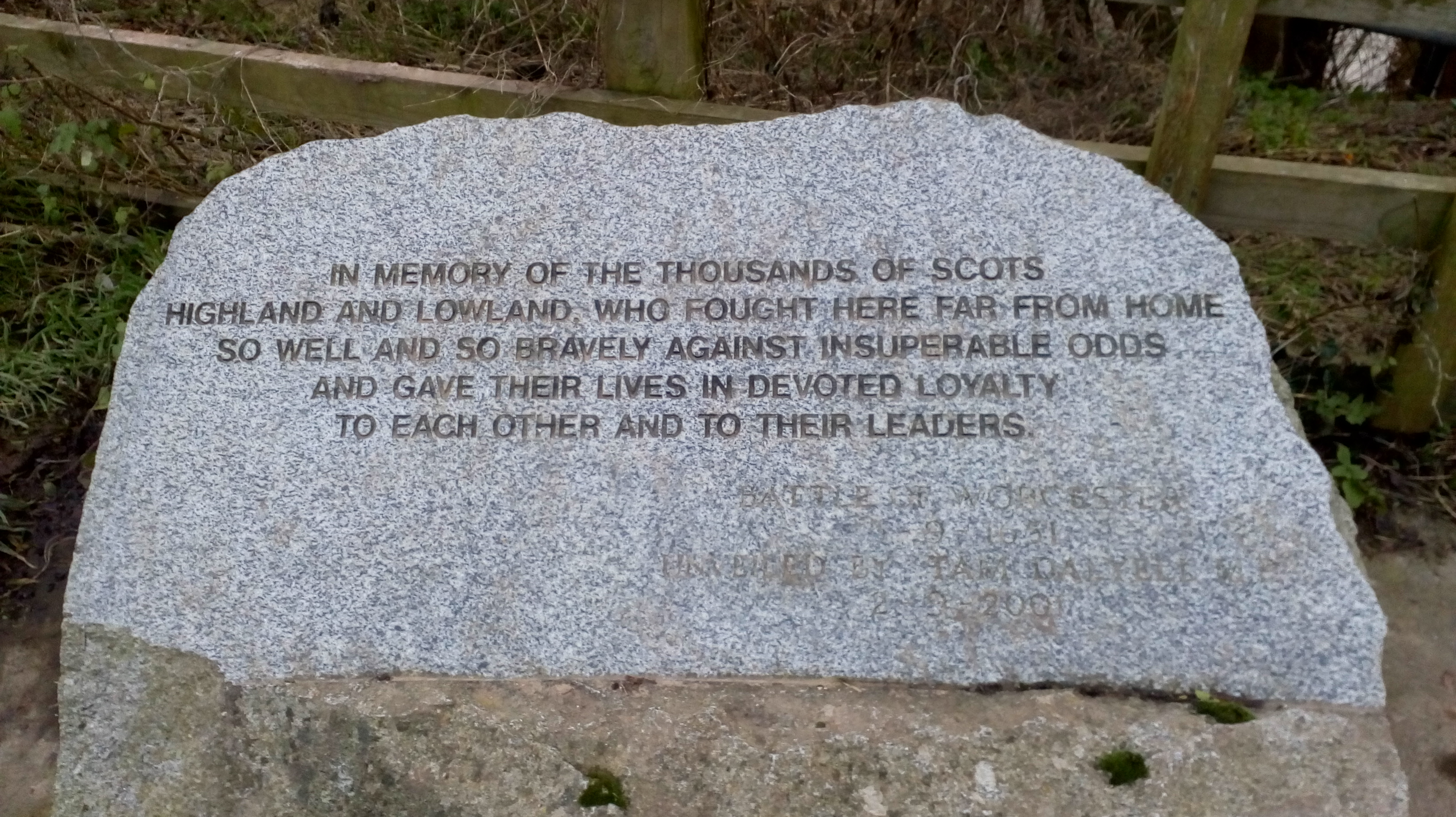
Memorial to the Scottish soldiers who died at the Battle of Worcester in 1651, located by Powick Old Bridge

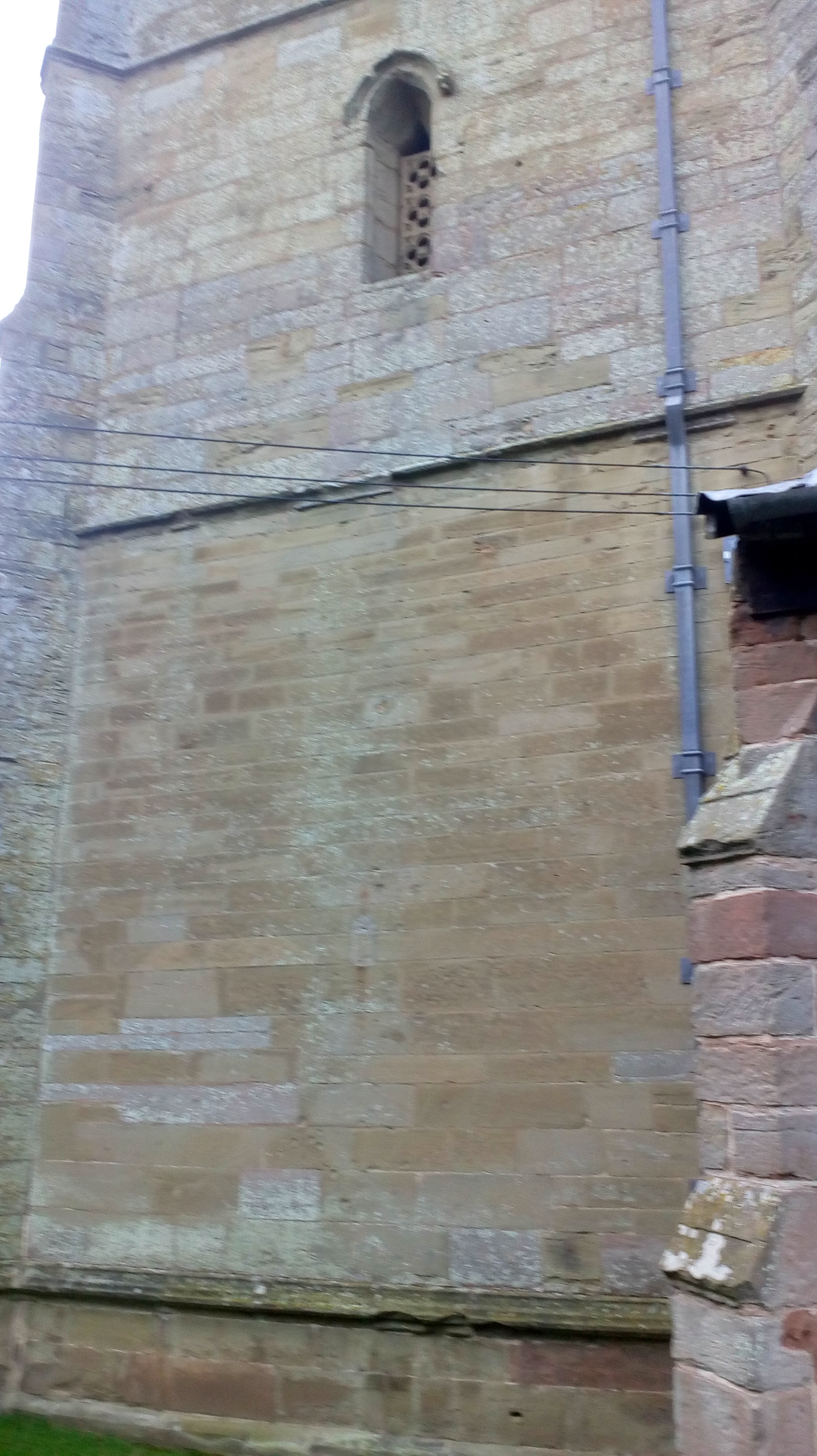
Damage to Powick Parish Church allegedly caused by Oliver Cromwell's troops firing their muskets at it around the time of the Battle of Worcester in 1651

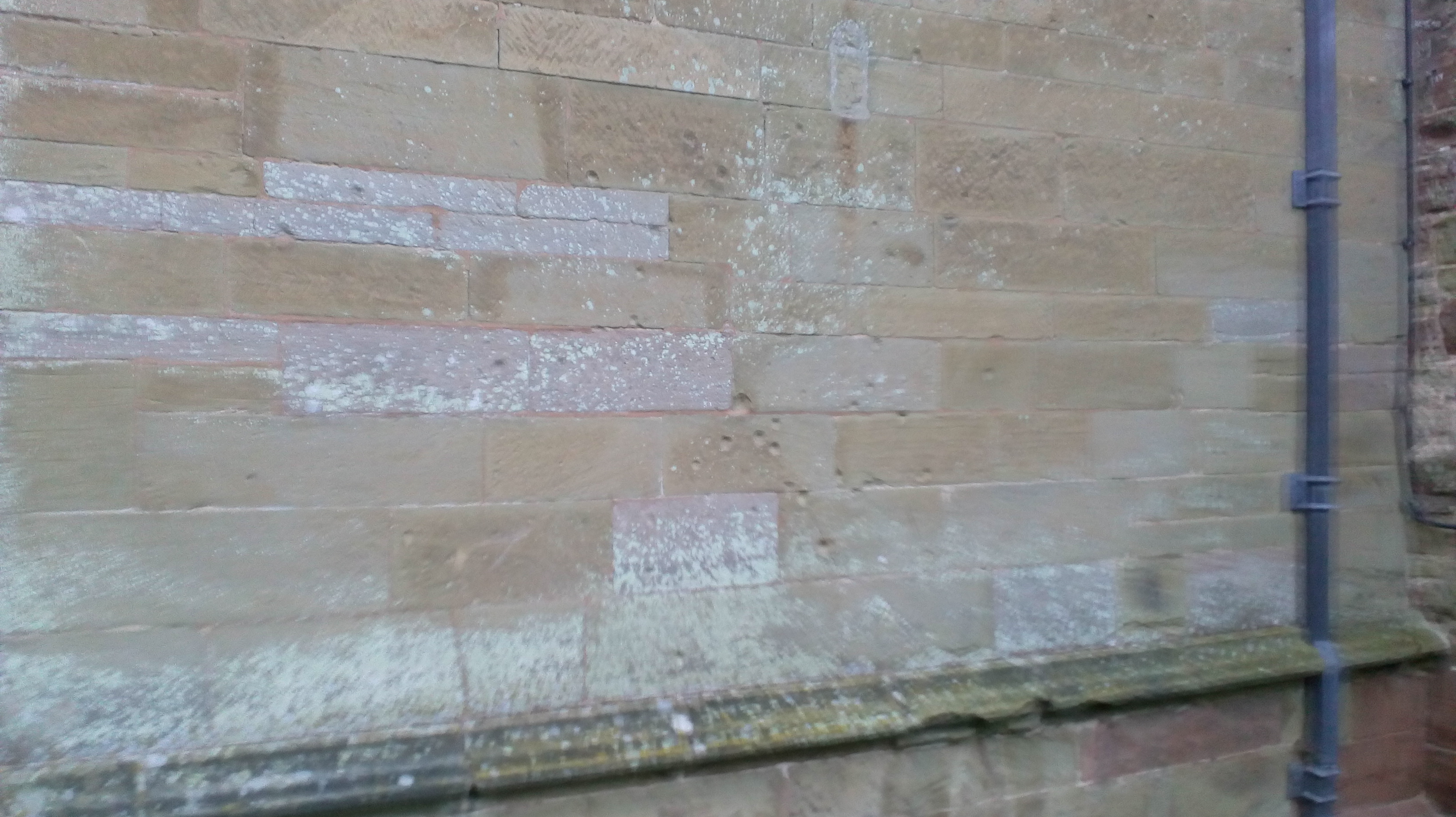
Damage to Powick Parish Church allegedly caused by Oliver Cromwell's troops firing their muskets at it around the time of the Battle of Worcester in 1651

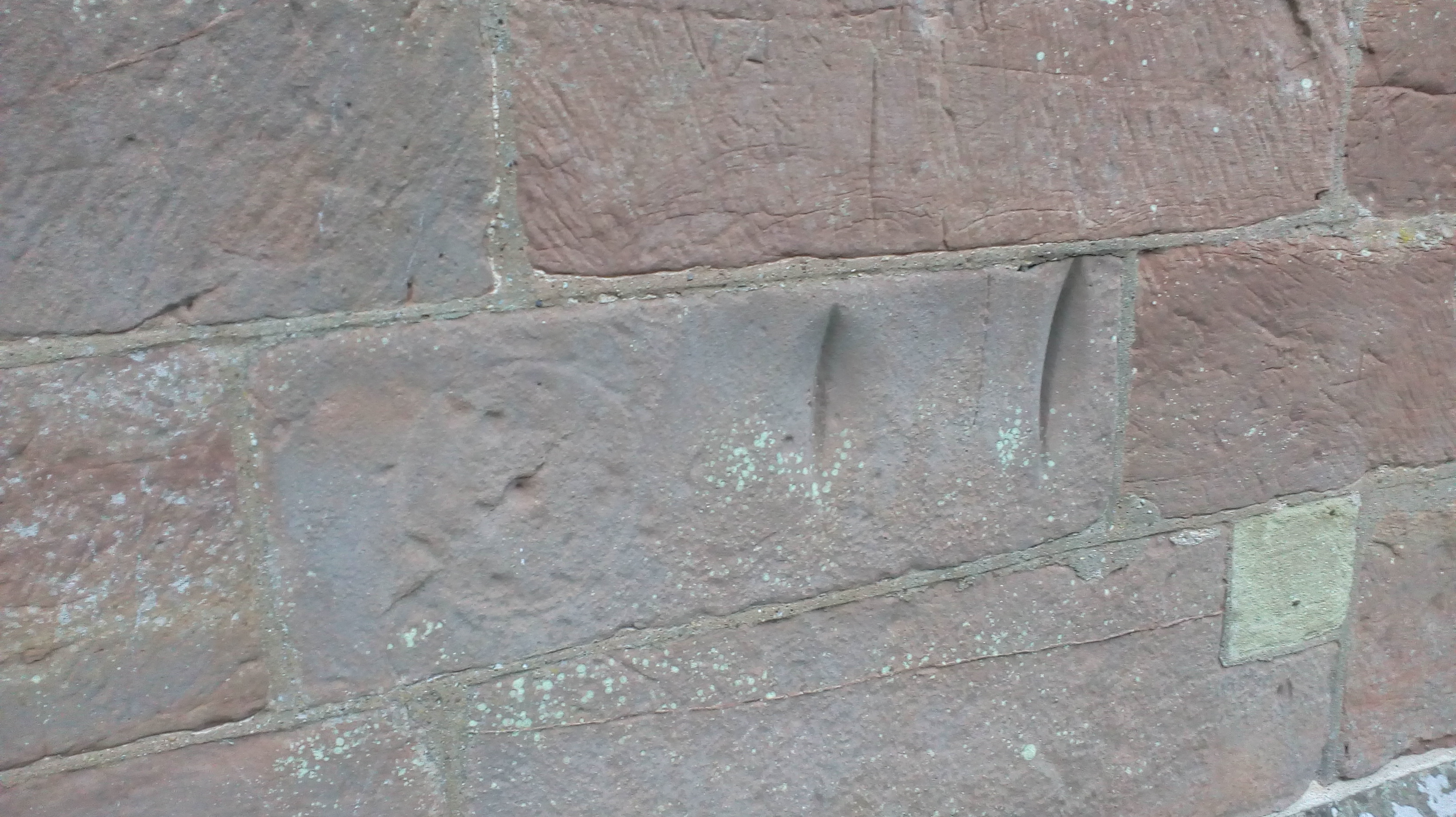
Damage to Powick Parish Church allegedly caused by Oliver Cromwell's troops sharpening their swords on it around the time of the Battle of Worcester in 1651
