= Dan Aldridge =

British politician (born 1984)

Dan Aldridge MP
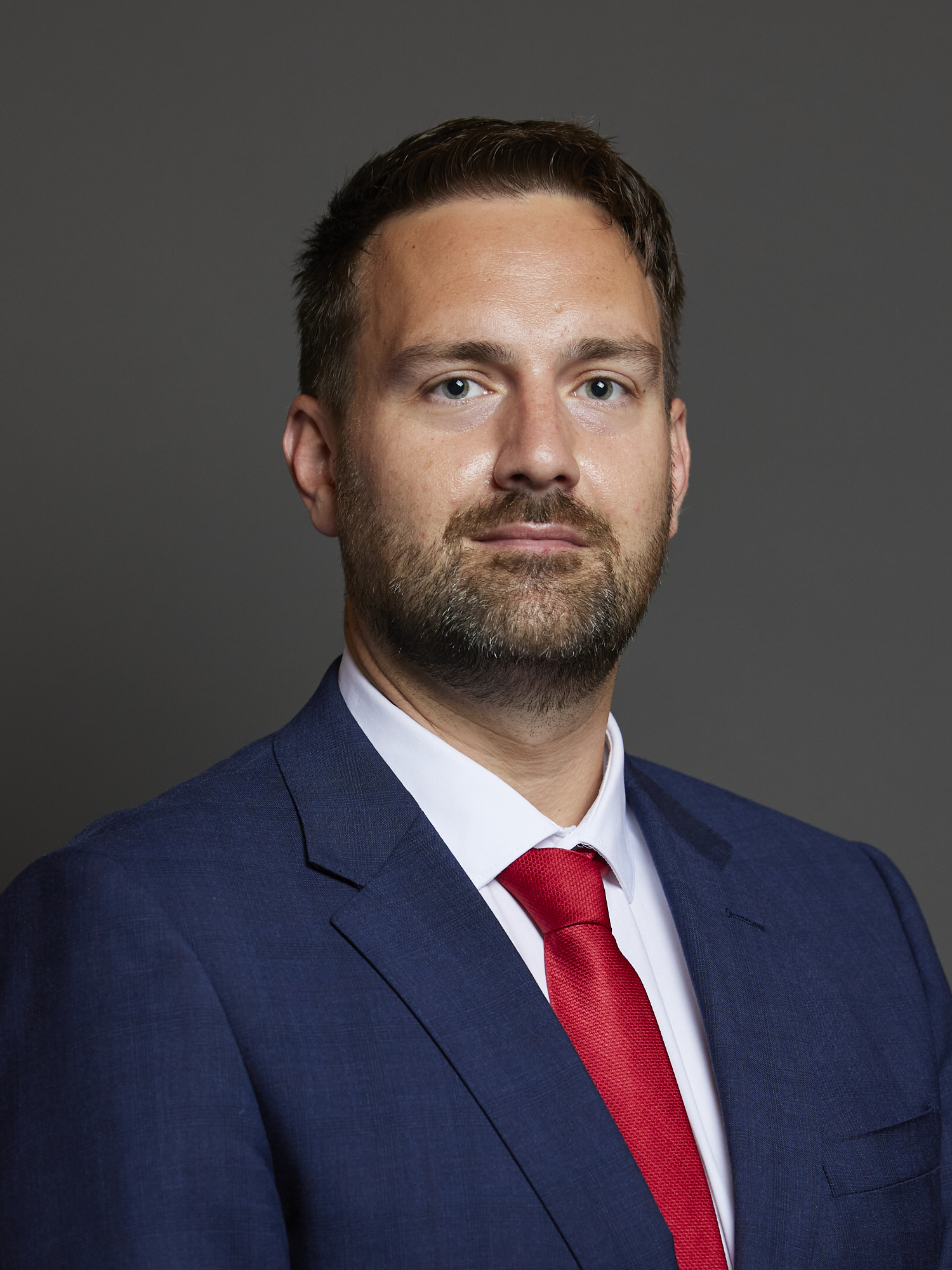
- Official portrait, 2024

Member of Parliament for Weston-super-Mare
- Incumbent
- Assumed office 4 July 2024
- Preceded by: John Penrose
- Majority: 4,409 (10.4%)

Personal details
- Born: Daniel Colin Aldridge; 24 August 1984 (age 42)
- Party: Labour
- Education: University of Exeter (BSc); Northumbria University (MSc)

Daniel Colin Aldridge (born 24 August 1984) is a British politician who has served as Member of Parliament (MP) for Weston-super-Mare since 2024. A member of the Labour Party, he is the first from his party to represent the constituency.

== Early life and education ==
Daniel Colin Aldridge was born on 24 August 1984 in Stoke-on-Trent, Staffordshire, England.

Aldridge studied for his A-levels at Weston College, before studying psychology at the University of Exeter and obtaining a MSc from Northumbria University.

== Career ==
Prior to the 2024 general election, Aldridge was the Head of Policy at the British Computer Society. He previously worked for the Office for Students, the Higher Education Funding Council for England and the charity Stonewall.

=== Political career ===
On 13 March 2024, Aldridge was selected as the Labour Party candidate for the constituency of Weston-super-Mare for the 2024 general election by local party members at a hustings event at The Royal Hotel. He was selected from a short-list of three, which included former MEP Alex Mayer.

He won 16,310 votes in the election with a majority of 4,409 votes, defeating the incumbent MP John Penrose. He became the first Labour MP to represent the constituency.

== Personal life ==
Aldridge permanently moved to Weston in 2001 with his parents and siblings, having been there on a caravan holiday the previous year.

Alridge is a Catholic. In 2024, PinkNews listed Aldridge among a number of out LGBTQ+ parliamentarians.

Parliament of the United Kingdom
| Preceded by John Penrose | Member of Parliament for Weston-super-Mare; 2024–present | Incumbent |
