= Brian Cotter, Baron Cotter =

British politician (1936–2023)

The Right Honourable The Lord Cotter
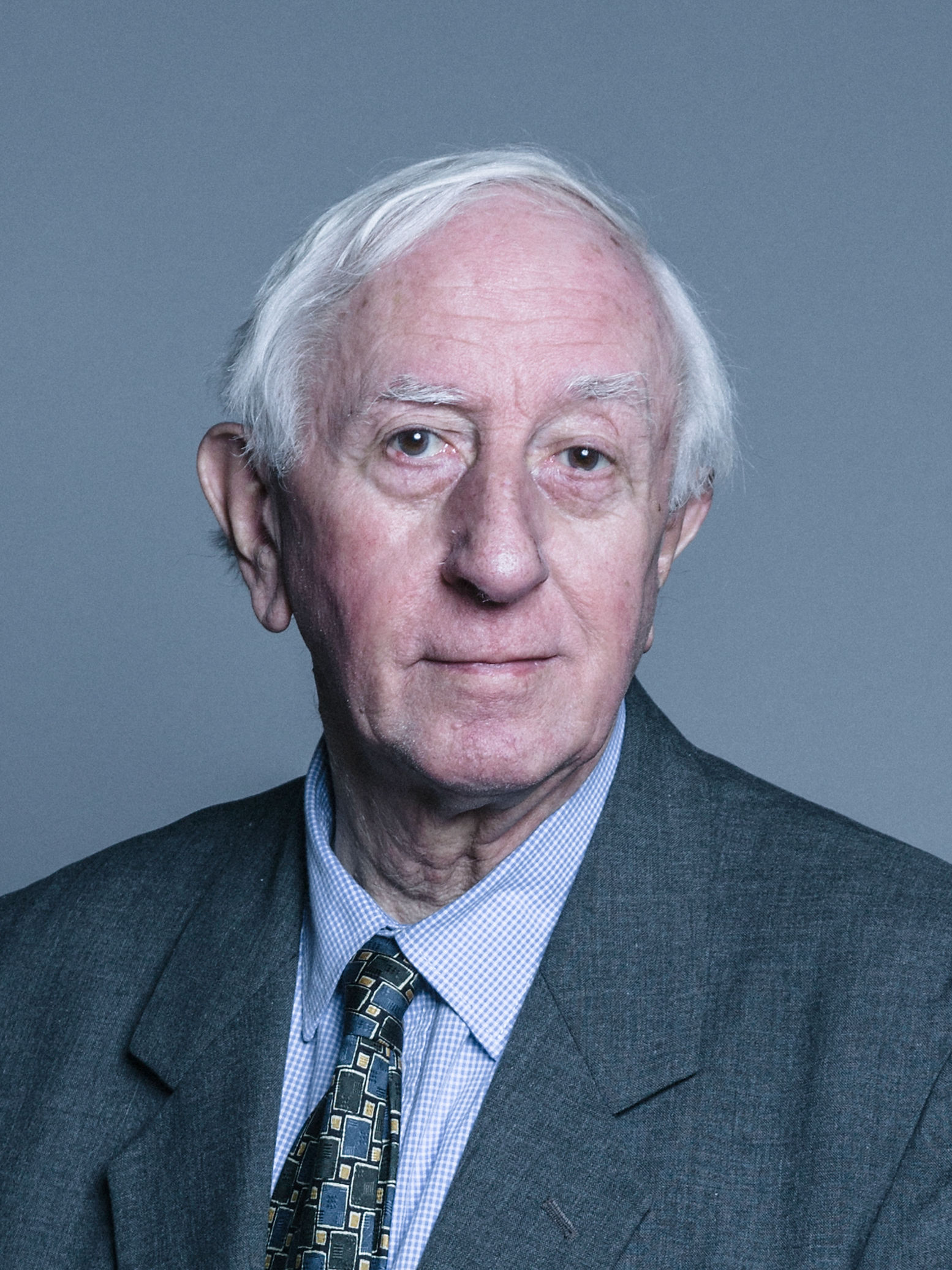
- Official portrait, 2018

Member of the House of Lords
- Lord Temporal
- Life peerage 30 May 2006 – 14 November 2023

Member of Parliament for Weston-super-Mare
- In office 1 May 1997 – 11 April 2005
- Preceded by: Jerry Wiggin
- Succeeded by: John Penrose

Personal details
- Born: Brian Joseph Michael Cotter; 24 August 1936 Ealing, Middlesex, England
- Died: 14 November 2023 (aged 87)
- Party: Liberal Democrats (after 1988)
- Other political affiliations: Liberal (1983–1988); Conservative (before 1983)
- Spouse: Eyleen Wade (m. 1963)
- Children: 3

Brian Joseph Michael Cotter, Baron Cotter (24 August 1936 – 14 November 2023), was a British Liberal Democrat politician. He was Member of Parliament for Weston-super-Mare from 1997 to 2005, and subsequently a member of the House of Lords from 2006 until his death.

== Background and career ==
Born in Ealing, the son of a doctor from Weston-super-Mare, Cotter was educated at Saint Benedict's School, Ealing, and Downside School in Somerset, where, aged sixteen, he ran a 4½ minute mile. Upon leaving school, he entered the British Army, serving two years National Service, spending time stationed in West Germany. He entered business after leaving the army. He studied Business Studies at a polytechnic in London, eventually running his own small manufacturing company, Plasticable Ltd in Alton, which is now run as a co-operative.

Formerly a Conservative before joining the Liberals in 1983, during the Liberal/SDP Alliance, Cotter was elected to Woking Borough Council in 1986, representing the Mount Hermon West ward. He retained this seat until standing down in 1990.

== Parliamentary career ==
After unsuccessfully contesting the seat in 1992, Cotter was elected the Liberal Democrat MP Member of Parliament for Weston-super-Mare in 1997. This was the first time the constituency had not returned a Conservative MP since 1923. He was re-elected in 2001, but lost the seat to John Penrose of the Conservatives at the 2005 general election. Throughout his time in Parliament, he served as the Liberal Democrat spokesman for small business.

In April 2006, it was announced that Cotter would be created a life peer to join the Liberal Democrat ranks in the House of Lords, and on 30 May he was created Baron Cotter, of Congresbury in the County of Somerset. He delivered his maiden speech in the Lords on 29 June.

Cotter took an interest in a number of areas, and on various issues as they arose. Specifically, before the coalition government was formed in 2010, he led for the Liberal Democrats on Small Business issues and vocational education; specifically apprenticeships. Within the coalition, he concentrated on business and vocational training issues.

== Personal life ==
Lord Cotter was a practising Roman Catholic. Cotter was a patron of domestic violence charity the ManKind Initiative.

Cotter married Eyleen Patricia Wade in February 1963. They had two sons and a daughter. Lord Cotter died from complications of dementia on 14 November 2023, at the age of 87.

Parliament of the United Kingdom
Preceded by Jerry Wiggin	Member of Parliament for Weston-super-Mare; 1997–2005	Succeeded by John Penrose
