= John Penrose =

British Conservative politician

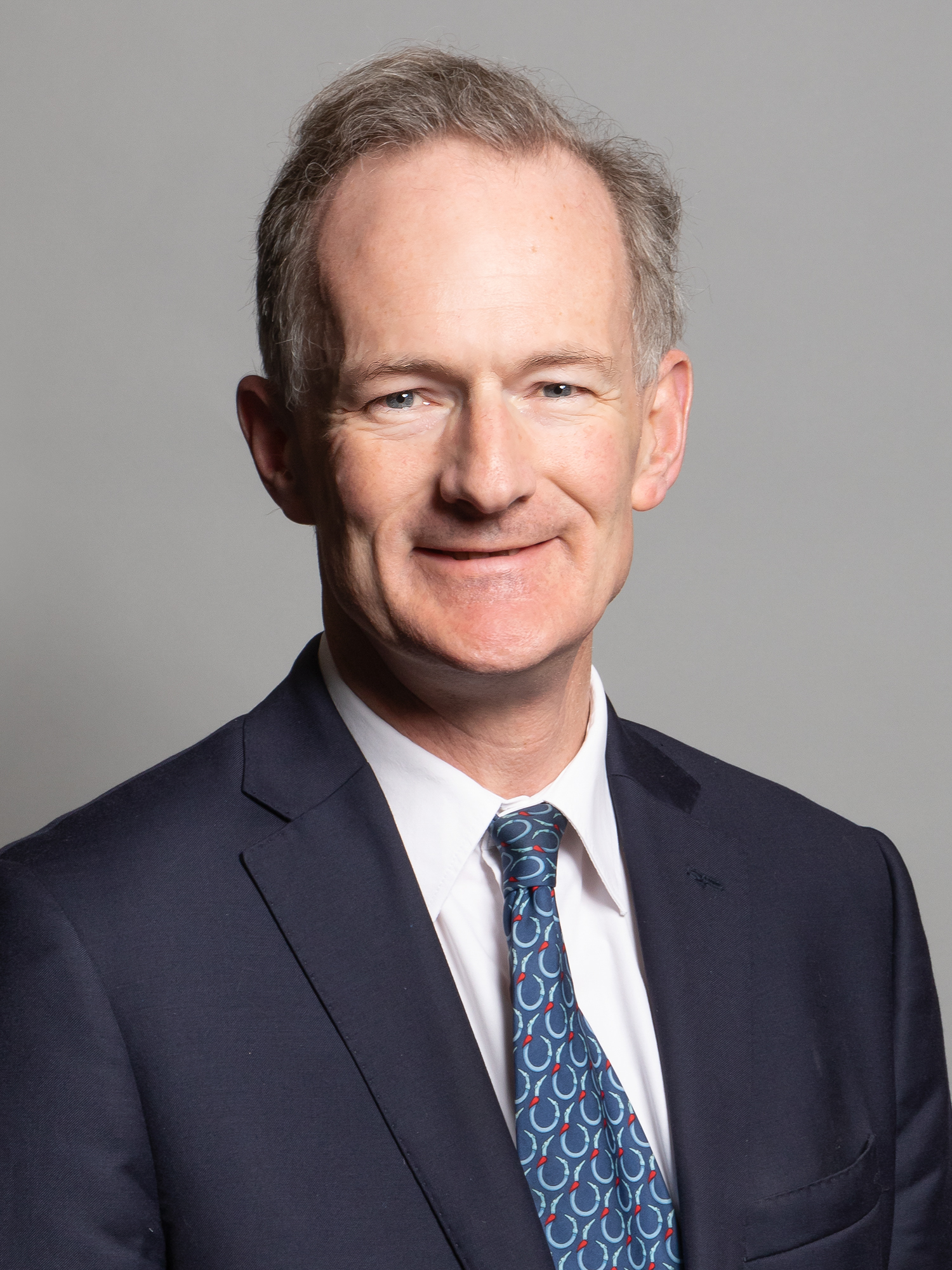
- Official portrait, 2020

United Kingdom Anti-Corruption Champion
- In office 11 December 2017 – 6 June 2022
- Prime Minister: Theresa May; Boris Johnson
- Preceded by: Eric Pickles
- Succeeded by: The Baroness Hodge of Barking

Minister of State for Northern Ireland
- In office 16 November 2018 – 25 July 2019
- Prime Minister: Theresa May
- Preceded by: Shailesh Vara
- Succeeded by: Nick Hurd

Parliamentary Secretary for the Constitution
- In office 11 May 2015 – 17 July 2016
- Prime Minister: David Cameron
- Preceded by: Sam Gyimah
- Succeeded by: Chris Skidmore

Lord Commissioner of the Treasury
- In office 8 February 2014 – 17 July 2016
- Prime Minister: David Cameron
- Preceded by: Karen Bradley
- Succeeded by: Guy Opperman

Parliamentary Under-Secretary of State for Tourism and Heritage
- In office 13 May 2010 – 4 September 2012
- Prime Minister: David Cameron
- Preceded by: Margaret Hodge
- Succeeded by: Office abolished

Member of Parliament for Weston-super-Mare
- In office 5 May 2005 – 30 May 2024
- Preceded by: Brian Cotter
- Succeeded by: Dan Aldridge

Personal details
- Born: 22 June 1964 (age 62) Sudbury, Suffolk, England
- Party: Conservative
- Spouse: Dido Harding, Baroness Harding (m. 1995)
- Education: Downing College, Cambridge; Columbia Business School
- Website: www.johnpenrose.org

John David Penrose (born 22 June 1964) is a British politician who served as Member of Parliament (MP) for Weston-super-Mare from 2005 until 2024. A member of the Conservative Party, he was the United Kingdom Anti-Corruption Champion at the Home Office from 2017 until 2022. He resigned on 6 June 2022 as the United Kingdom Anti-Corruption Champion due to the Boris Johnson Partygate scandal.

Penrose previously served as Parliamentary Under-Secretary of State at the Department for Culture, Media and Sport from 2010 to 2012 and Lord Commissioner of the Treasury from 2014 to 2016. He was Minister of State for Northern Ireland from 2018 to 2019.

== Early life and career ==
John Penrose was born in Sudbury, Suffolk, on 22 June 1964. He was privately educated at Ipswich School and studied at Downing College, Cambridge, receiving a BA in law in 1986. He received an MBA from Columbia Business School, New York in 1991.

He was a bank trading floor risk manager at JPMorgan Chase from 1986 to 1990, then a management consultant at McKinsey & Company from 1992 to 1994.

He was commercial director of the Academic Books Division at Thomson Publishing in Andover from 1995 to 1996, then managing director of schools book publishing at Longman (Pearson plc), publishing school textbooks for the UK and parts of Africa. He was chairman of Logotron Ltd in Cambridge (also owned by Pearson). In 1998, he was in charge of research at the Bow Group – a UK-based independent think tank, promoting conservative opinion internationally.

== Parliamentary career ==
Penrose stood as the Conservative candidate in Ealing Southall in the 1997 general election, coming second with 20.8% of the vote behind the incumbent Labour MP Piara Khabra.

At the 2001 general election, Penrose stood in Weston-super-Mare, coming second with 38.7% of the vote behind the incumbent Liberal Democrat MP Brian Cotter. He was elected at the 2005 general election as MP for Weston-super-Mare, winning with 40.3% of the vote and a majority of 2,079.

Penrose served on the Work and Pensions Committee from July 2005 to January 2009, and in 2006 was appointed joint chairman of the All-Party Parliamentary Group (APPG) on Further Education and Lifelong Learning. In 2006 he was also appointed Parliamentary Private Secretary to Oliver Letwin MP and in 2009 was promoted to Shadow Minister for Business, Enterprise and Regulatory Reform.

At the 2010 general election, Penrose was re-elected as MP for Weston-super-Mare with an increased vote share of 44.3% and an increased majority of 2,691.

After the formation of the coalition government, Penrose served as the Minister for Tourism and Heritage from 2010 to 2012 during which he wrote and implemented the government's tourism strategy, removed licences on live entertainment sold The Tote bookmaker and protected the Lloyd's of London building with a 'Grade 1' listing.

Penrose returned to the backbenches in 2012. He wrote a paper (We Deserve Better) on how to give people a better deal on their utilities. Less than a year later David Cameron brought Penrose back to a government role with a new position as assistant whip at the Treasury, before he was promoted in February 2014 as one of the Lords Commissioners of the Treasury (whip). In May 2015 he became Parliamentary Secretary for the Constitution, a role he held until July 2016.

Penrose was again re-elected at the 2015 general election with an increased vote share of 48% and an increased majority of 15,609.

He was opposed to Brexit prior to the 2016 referendum. Since the result was announced, Penrose supported the official position of his party as an advocate of leaving the European Union.

At the snap 2017 general election, Penrose was again re-elected, with an increased vote share of 53.1% and a decreased majority of 11,544.

He was appointed the Prime Minister's Anti-Corruption Champion in December 2017, and then reappointed in July 2019. Penrose was a Minister of State in the Northern Ireland Office from November 2018 to July 2019.

Penrose came under criticism for voting to change lobbying rules in order to defend his Conservative colleague Owen Paterson, who had been found to have "repeatedly used his privileged position to benefit two companies for whom he was a paid consultant". One of the companies that Paterson was paid to lobby for, Randox, was awarded contracts from the Department of Health and Social Care during the pandemic. Penrose defended the government's issuing of such contracts to Conservative donors, associates and inexperienced companies. The High Court also ruled that the-then Prime Minister Boris Johnson's appointment of Dido Harding, Penrose's wife, to chair the National Institute for Health Protection, overseeing the Test and Trace initiative was illegal; the scheme cost £37bn which was allocated to Serco and other private companies, before it failed in its primary objectives.

In October 2020 he attracted media attention by suggesting that "chaotic parents" are to blame for sending their children to school hungry.

Penrose resigned as the Anti-Corruption Champion on 6 June 2022, the same day as the vote of no confidence in Boris Johnson. He said he could not defend "a fundamental breach of the ministerial code." He also confirmed he would be voting against Johnson in the vote of no confidence.

In the 2024 United Kingdom general election, he was unseated by Dan Aldridge from the Labour Party.

== Post-parliamentary career ==
Following his defeat at the 2024 UK General Election, Penrose has worked as a freelance columnist.

== Personal life ==
Penrose met Dido Harding (who was made Baroness Harding of Winscombe in 2014), only daughter of Lord Harding of Petherton, while both worked at McKinsey. The couple married in October 1995, and have two daughters. Penrose has a house in his Weston-super-Mare constituency and a flat in London. Harding is the chair of NHS Improvement, the former head of NHS Test and Trace, and the former Chief Executive of TalkTalk Group.

In 2016, Penrose, who lives in Winscombe, caused some local controversy over the design of a proposed swimming pool complex at his home. Winscombe and Sandford Parish Council formally objected to the 'ugly and massive' design on the grounds it would harm local views. The Daily Telegraph reported that this was noteworthy as Penrose had argued in 2013, in a previous ministerial role, for greater protection of historic views, suggesting some of the finest urban views in the country should be listed like buildings. Ultimately, the district council approved the planning application and accepted the argument that an originally planned grass roof was not possible. In May 2020, Penrose joined the advisory board of the think tank 1828 which has campaigned to scrap the NHS and replace it with a health insurance based system.

Parliament of the United Kingdom
Preceded by Brian Cotter	Member of Parliament for Weston-super-Mare; 2005–2024	Succeeded by Dan Aldridge
