= Ian Orr-Ewing (Weston-super-Mare MP) =

British politician (1893-1958)

Sir Ian Orr-Ewing
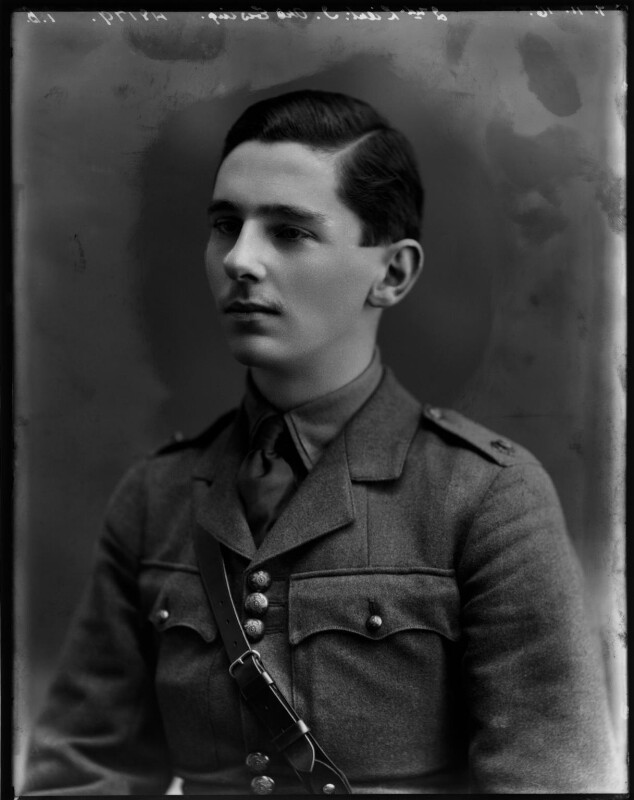
- Ian Orr-Ewing in 1916

Member of Parliament for Weston-super-Mare
- In office 26 June 1934 – 27 April 1958
- Preceded by: John Erskine
- Succeeded by: David Webster

Personal details
- Born: 4 June 1893 Ayr, Ayrshire, Scotland
- Died: 27 April 1958 (aged 64)
- Party: Conservative

Sir Ian Leslie Orr-Ewing (4 June 1893 – 27 April 1958) was a British Conservative Party politician.

Orr-Ewing was born in Ayr, Scotland, the son of Charles Orr-Ewing, Member of Parliament (MP) for Ayr Burghs. He contested Gateshead in 1929. He was elected as Member of Parliament (MP) for Weston-super-Mare in the 1934 by-election after the resignation of Lord Erskine. He served as an MP until his death in April 1958, aged 64.

Orr-Ewing was knighted in the 1953 New Year Honours.

Parliament of the United Kingdom
Preceded by Lord Erskine	Member of Parliament for Weston-super-Mare; 1934–1958	Succeeded by David Webster
