= John Erskine, Lord Erskine =

British soldier, politician and colonial administrator (1895–1953)

Lord Erskine GCSI GCIE
- Erskine c. 1940

Governor of Madras Presidency
- In office 15 November 1934 – 18 June 1936
- Governors-General: The Marquess of Willingdon, The Marquess of Linlithgow
- Premier: Ramakrishna Ranga Rao of Bobbili, P. T. Rajan
- Preceded by: Hon. Sir George Frederick Stanley
- Succeeded by: Sir Kurma Venkata Reddy Naidu (acting)
- In office 1 October 1936 – 12 March 1940
- Governor-General: The Marquess of Linlithgow
- Premier: P. T. Rajan, Kurma Venkata Reddy Naidu, Chakravarti Rajagopalachari
- Preceded by: Sir Kurma Venkata Reddy Naidu (acting)
- Succeeded by: Hon. Arthur Hope

Personal details
- Born: 12 April 1895
- Died: 3 May 1953 (aged 58) United Kingdom
- Party: Conservative
- Spouse: Lady Marjorie Hervey
- Education: Eton, Christ Church, Oxford
- Occupation: Politician, administrator
- Profession: Soldier

John Francis Ashley Erskine, Lord Erskine GCSI, GCIE (12 April 1895 – 3 May 1953) was a British soldier, Conservative Party politician and administrator who served as Member of Parliament (MP) for Weston-super-Mare and Brighton. Erskine also served as the governor of Madras Presidency from 1934 to 1940.

Erskine was born to Walter Erskine, 12th Earl of Mar on 12 April 1895 and had his education at Eton and Oxford University. On graduation, Erskine served in the British Army and rose to become a major before entering politics. Erskine was elected to the House of Commons as a candidate of the Conservative Party from Weston-super-Mare and served as MP from 1922 to 1923 and from 1924 to 1934. He also served as Assistant Government Whip from 1930 to 1934. In 1934, Erskine was appointed Governor of Madras Presidency, British India.

Erskine served as the governor of Madras Presidency from 1934 to 1940. He was a close friend of Indian politician Chakravarthi Rajagopalachari though he disagreed with some of his policies. On the conclusion of his term, Erskine returned to the United Kingdom and served as the Member of Parliament for Brighton from 1940 to 1941. Erskine retired from politics in his later life. He died on 3 May 1953 at the age of 58.

== Family and early life ==
John Erskine was born on 12 April 1895 to Walter Erskine, 12th Earl of Mar and his wife Lady Violet Ashley Cooper (1868–1938). He was the eldest of their two sons and had his education at Eton and Christ Church, Oxford University.

John Erskine married Lady Marjorie Hervey, the elder daughter of the 4th Marquess of Bristol, on 2 December 1919 and had four sons.

== Military career ==
On outbreak of the First World War, Erskine enlisted in the Scots Guards. By the end of the war he was a Major in the Argyll and Sutherland Highlanders.

== Politics ==
With an interest in politics and an allegiance to the Conservative Party, Erskine was appointed Assistant Private Secretary to Viscount Long in 1920. At the 1922 general election, Erskine was elected as Conservative Member of Parliament for Weston-super-Mare. He lost his seat to a Liberal in the 1923 general election but easily regained it in 1924 and did not face a serious challenge there again.

William Joynson-Hicks, then a rapidly rising Conservative Minister, appointed Erskine as his Parliamentary Private Secretary in 1922, which gave him considerable interesting work to do. Joynson-Hicks was among the more controversial Ministers and had especial need to know that he had the support of Conservative backbenchers, and this Erskine was able to arrange.

After the 1931 general election, Erskine was named as an unpaid Assistant Government whip on 12 November 1931. This appointment effectively silenced Erskine in the Chamber of the House of Commons due to the tradition that Whips do not make speeches. Previously Erskine had been an effective and confident speaker who had taken a close interest in the affairs of India (although he admitted never to having visited it). He followed the 'Round Table Conferences' of the early 1930s closely.

In his later years, Erskine served as a member of Parliament for the two-member Brighton constituency. However Erskine's public support for native rule in India counted against him with Winston Churchill who had led the opposition to the Government of India Act 1935. Although hopeful of appointment to government office, Erskine was given nothing.

== As Governor of Madras Presidency ==
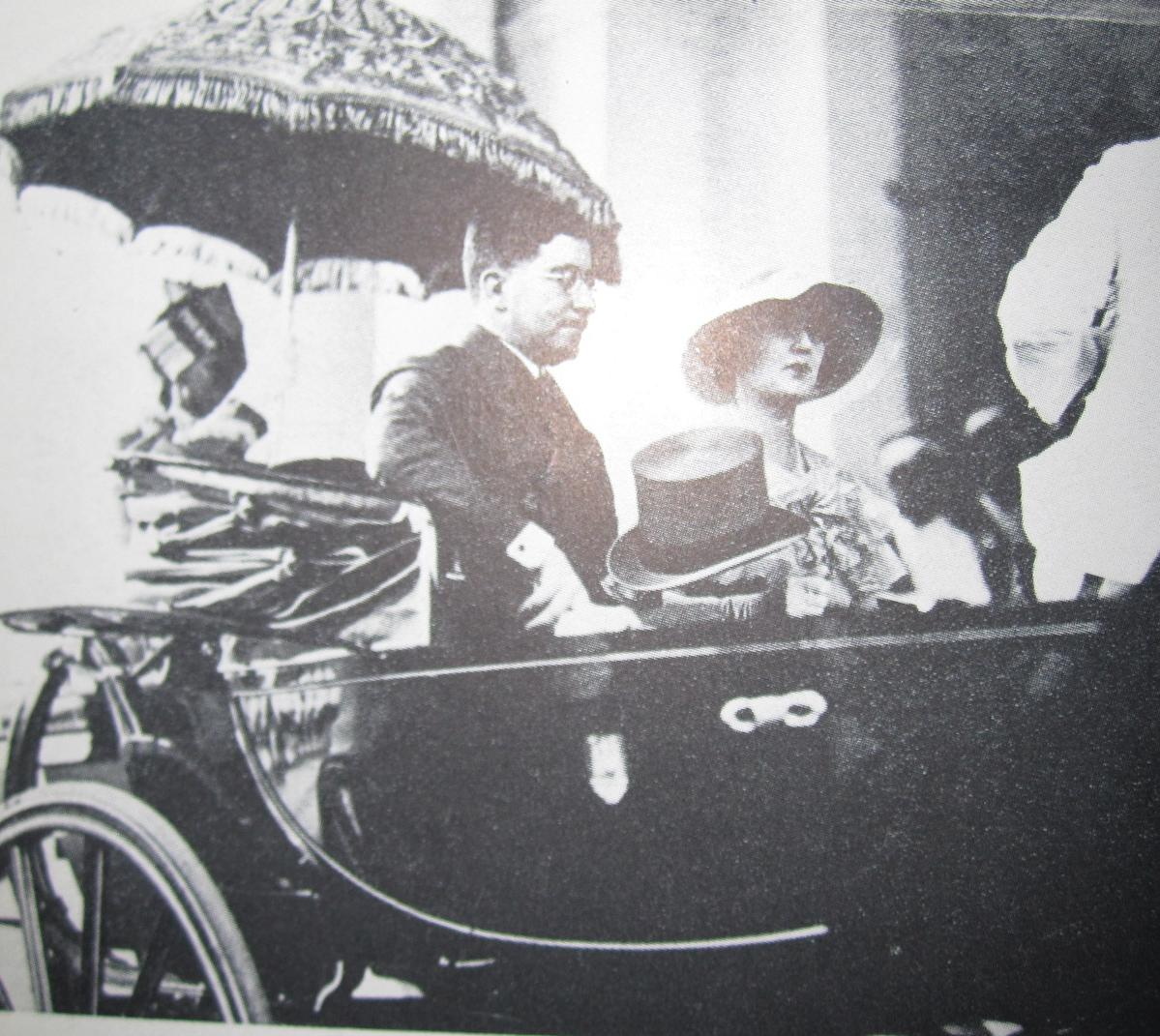
Lord Erskine with his wife Marjorie in Madras in the 1930s

On 22 May 1934 Erskine was appointed the new Governor of Madras. Although his appointment commenced in November, Erskine resigned his seat through appointment as Steward of the Chiltern Hundreds at the beginning of June.

In 1934, Erskine succeeded George Frederick Stanley as the Governor of Madras Presidency and served from 1934 to 1940. Erskine was a supporter of the Justice Party and wanted the party to capture power in the Presidency during the 1937 elections. However, to his disappointment, the Indian National Congress won by a huge margin. Despite being the majority party in the Assembly and the council, the Congress refused to form the government. Their objections stemmed from the special powers given to the governor by the Government of India Act of 1935. Erskine decided to form an interim provisional Government with non-members and opposition members of the Legislative Assembly. He first offered the Prime Minister post in the interim government to V. S. Srinivasa Sastri but Shastri refused to accept it. Then Erskine formed the interim Government with Kurma Venkata Reddy Naidu of the Justice Party as premier on 1 April 1937. He also used the Minister for Public Health R. M. Palat to try and entice Congress legislators into supporting the government. Wary of his tactics, Congress leaders like S. Satyamurti started a campaign to convince Congress High Command (Gandhi and Nehru) to accept power within the limitations set by the Government of India Act. They also appealed to the British Government to give assurances that the Governor's special powers will not be misused. On 22 June, Viceroy Linlithgow issued a statement expressing the British Government's desire to work with the Congress in implementing the 1935 Act. On 1 July, the Congress Working Committee (CWC) agreed to form Governments in the provinces they had won. On 14 July, Erskine had to swear in the Congress leader Chakravarthi Rajagopalachari as the Premier.

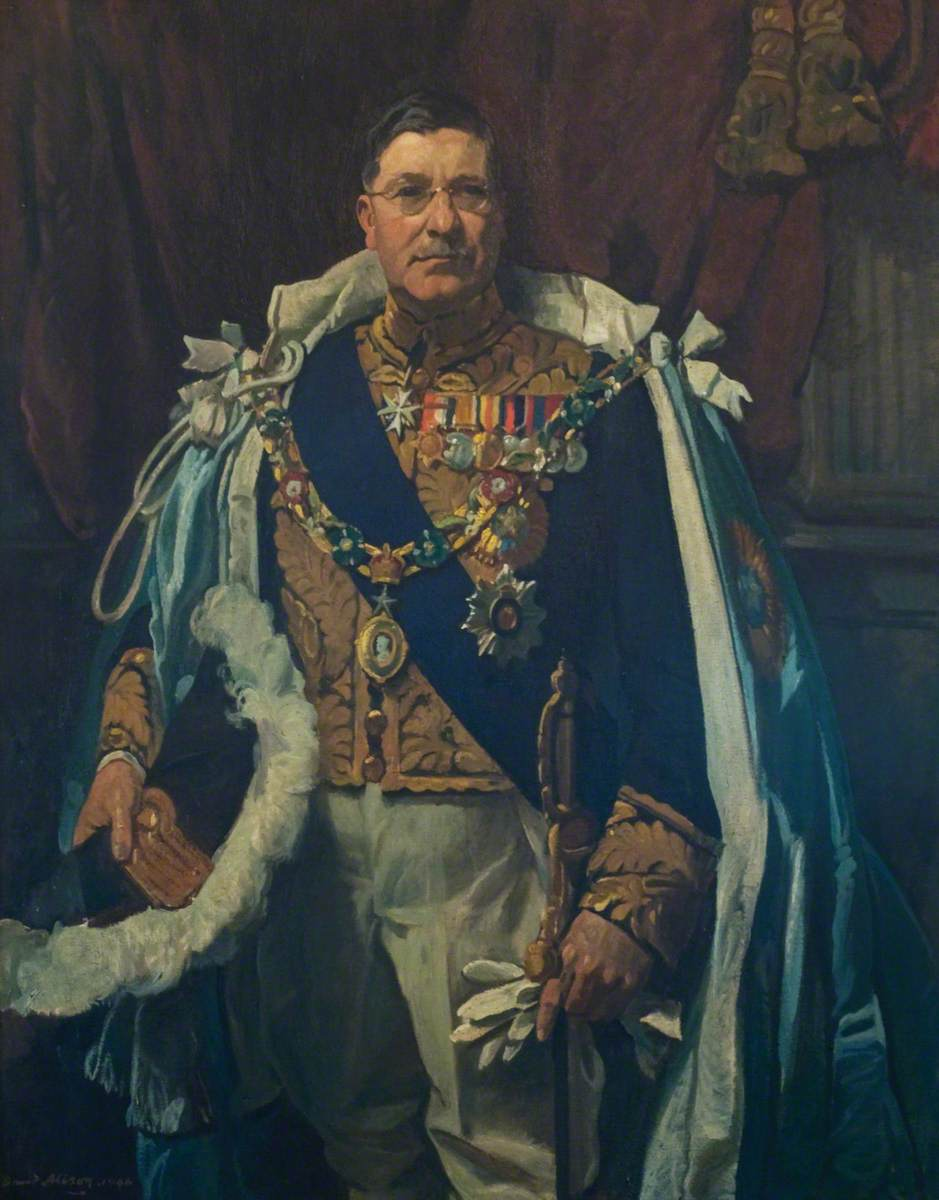
Lord Erskine GCSI GCIE in the mantle of the Knight Grand Commander of the Order of the Star of India

Erskine had a cordial personal relationship with Rajagopalachari though they disagreed over some issues. When Rajagopalachari took a month's leave, he requested Erskine to look after most of his duties. It is also alleged that Rajagopalachari suggested knighthoods for some his friends. However, there were disagreements over the constitution of the ministry. Erskine also opposed Rajagopalachari's usage of the Criminal Law Amendment Act of 1932 during the 1938 Anti-Hindi agitations:"..[Rajagopalachari] was too much of a Tory for me, for though I may want to go back twenty years, he wishes to go back two thousand and to run India as it was run in the time of King Ashoka".

Erskine was also a regular visitor to the Nilgiri Hills. On a public reception accorded to him by the Kotagiri Panchayat Board in 1935, he gave Kotagiri town the sobriquet, "Princess among Hill Stations". The first regular radio service in the Madras Presidency commenced in 1938 when the All India Radio established its station in Madras.

The Congress ministry resigned on 9 October 1939 over the outbreak of Second World War. Erskine declared an emergency and took over the reins of the administration. Rajagopalachari and other ministers were arrested as per Defence of India Act rules. On 21 February 1940, Erskine repealed the unpopular law imposing compulsory study of Hindi in the Madras Presidency.

== Later life ==
With no hope of continuing a political career, and finding that representing the seat was very expensive, Erskine resigned his seat and went to live in his house at Ickworth near Bury St Edmunds. He continued to comment on Indian affairs, bemoaning the influence of Gandhi. His second son was killed in action in 1945.

Active in voluntary work locally, Erskine was appointed President of the Navy League. A major operation in the early 1950s damaged his health, and he died in 1953 during the lifetime of his father.

== Notes ==
Parliament of the United Kingdom
Preceded by Sir Gilbert Wills, Bt.	Member of Parliament for Weston-super-Mare; 1922–1923	Succeeded by Frank Murrell
Preceded by Frank Murrell	Member of Parliament for Weston-super-Mare; 1924–1934	Succeeded by Ian Orr-Ewing
Preceded by George Tryon; Sir Cooper Rawson	Member of Parliament for Brighton; 1940–1941; With: Sir Cooper Rawson	Succeeded by Anthony Marlowe; Sir Cooper Rawson
Government offices
Preceded by Hon. Sir George Stanley	Governor of Madras; 1934–1940	Succeeded by Hon. Arthur Hope
