= Granville Bromley-Martin =

English cricketer (1875–1941)

Granville Edward Bromley-Martin (18 October 1875 – 31 May 1941) was an English first-class cricketer: right-handed batsman and occasional right-arm slow bowler who played for Oxford University and Worcestershire around the turn of the 20th century.

Born in Callow End, Worcestershire, of the family that ran Martins Bank, Bromley-Martin was educated at Eton where he was captain of the cricket XI and president of "Pop" (the Eton Society). He then went up to New College, Oxford, where he made his first-class cricket debut for Oxford University in 1897 against AJ Webbe's XI at The Parks and making 56 and 23 in a five-wicket victory. Later in the season he hit his maiden first-class century, and what was to remain a career high, when he scored 137 out of 250 as Oxford defeated Sussex by an innings. He finished the season with 409 runs at 34.08, which again were to remain career bests.

1898 was a relatively thin year for Bromley-Martin, and he averaged only a little over 20. The following season he turned out for Worcestershire in their first ever first-class game, against Yorkshire, and though making only nought and 12 he played in nine further games for the county that summer, appearing on several occasions with his brother Eliot. Against Derbyshire in August, he made his second and last hundred when he hit 129 (including 19 fours) in a crushing innings-and-218-run win.

Bromley-Martin made ten more appearances for Worcestershire in 1900, but made only one fifty and averaged barely 18. He was then out of the county side for two full seasons before returning in 1903 to play six more games – again with just the single half-century. In 1904 he claimed his solitary first-class wicket against Kent when he dismissed Arthur Fielder for 37, Fielder having added 103 for the tenth wicket with James Seymour (136).

Later in 1904 Bromley-Martin appeared against his old university, making 38. His final first-class game was against Warwickshire in early August; he made 56 and 1 in a drawn match. He died in Streat, Sussex, at the age of 65.

Granville's brother Eliot also played for both Oxford University and Worcestershire, and his nephew Douglas Holland-Martin played twice in first-class games for the Royal Navy in the 1920s.

In later life Bromley-Martin was deputy-chairman of the family bank, and a director of other banks and of the British North Borneo Company. He was a trustee of the Savile Club.
