= David Webster (British politician) =

British politician

Member of Parliament for Weston-super-Mare
- In office 12 June 1958 – 7 January 1969
- Preceded by: Ian Orr-Ewing
- Succeeded by: Jerry Wiggin

Personal details
- Born: 20 October 1923 Arbroath, Scotland
- Died: 7 January 1969 (aged 45) Westminster Hospital, London
- Party: Conservative

David William Ernest Webster (20 October 1923 – 7 January 1969) was a British Conservative Party politician.

Born in Arbroath, Scotland, Webster was educated at Fettes College, Edinburgh and Downing College, Cambridge (MA History), and was a stockbroker before entering Parliament. He contested Bristol North East in 1955. He was elected as Member of Parliament (MP) for Weston-super-Mare in the 1958 by-election after the death of Sir Ian Leslie Orr-Ewing. He was returned at the three subsequent general elections.

Webster died suddenly at Westminster Hospital on 7 January 1969, after being taken ill following an Austrian ski holiday with his family. He had a fall while skiing but it was not clear if this was a contributory factor in his death. He was 45 years old. The consequent by-election for his seat was won by the Conservative candidate, Jerry Wiggin.

Parliament of the United Kingdom
Preceded by Sir Ian Leslie Orr-Ewing	Member of Parliament for Weston-super-Mare; 1958–1969	Succeeded by Jerry Wiggin
