= Rosemary Hawley Jarman =

English novelist (1935–2015)

- Born: 27 April 1935; Worcester, England
- Died: 17 March 2015 (aged 79); Pembrokeshire, Wales
- Occupations: Novelist, short story writer
- Spouse(s): David Jarman; R. T. Plumb
- Writing career
- Genre: Historical fiction
- Notable work: We Speak No Treason

Rosemary Hawley Jarman (27 April 1935 – 17 March 2015) was an English novelist and writer of short stories. Her first novel in 1971 shed light on King Richard III of England.

== Biography ==
Jarman was born in Worcester. She was educated first at Saint Mary's Convent and then at The Alice Ottley School, leaving at 18 to study singing in London for the next three years, having developed a fine soprano voice.

Family circumstances prevented her from continuing with this, and she worked for a time in local government. She married David Jarman in 1958, but divorced amicably from him in 1970. She lived most of her time at Callow End, Worcestershire, between Worcester and Upton on Severn.

In 1986 Jarman moved to Pembrokeshire in Wales with the prize-winning naturalist author R. T. Plumb. They married in September 2002, but Plumb died of cancer in October 2003.

Jarman died on 17 March 2015, at the age of 79.

== Writings ==
Jarman began to write for pleasure. She developed an obsession with the character of King Richard III (1452–1485, reigned 1483–1485), and with no thought of publication completed a 228,000 word novel showing the king in his true colours, away from Tudor and Shakespearian propaganda. The book was taken up almost accidentally by an agent. Within six weeks a contract for its publication and for four other novels was signed with William Collins Publishers (now HarperCollins).

The author had short stories published in magazines in the UK and France and was a member of the Society of Authors from 1970. She was dubbed "A Daughter of Mark Twain" by the Samuel Clemens Society in the US for her services to literature.

== Published works ==
Novels

- We Speak No Treason (1971), awarded The Silver Quill and the Author's Club First Novel Award. (Later published as two volumes: 1) The Flowering of the Rose and 2) The White Rose Turned to Blood, Tempus, 2006)
- The King's Grey Mare (1972)
- Crispin's Day (1978)
- Crown in Candlelight (1978)
- The Courts of Illusion (William Collins 1983)
- The Mists of Melusine (Daw Books 1996)
- The Captain's Witch (Egerton House Publishing 2005)

Short Stories

- 'The Mists of Melusine' (1996)
- "Ai No Corrida" published in Eros in Hell (Creation Books 1998)
- The Mammoth Book of Historical Erotica (1999) Three short stories.
- 'More in Sorrow' (2009)
- 'Between Ourselves' (2009, with Tanith Lee)
- 'Fire and Ice and Burning Rose' (2012)
