= Callow End =

Village in Worcestershire, England

Coordinates: 52.143313°N 2.243314°W

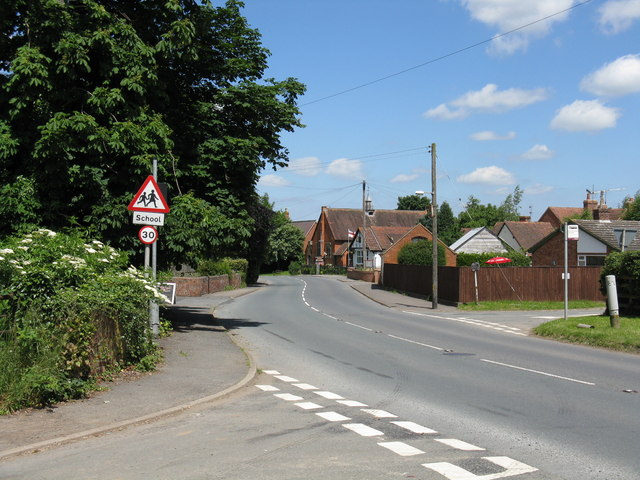

- Location within Worcestershire
- District: Malvern Hills
- Shire county: Worcestershire
- Region: West Midlands
- Country: England
- Sovereign state: United Kingdom
- Post town: Worcester
- Postcode district: WR2
- Police: West Mercia
- Fire: Hereford and Worcester
- Ambulance: West Midlands
- UK Parliament: West Worcestershire

Callow End is a constituent village of the civil parish of Powick in the Malvern Hills District of Worcestershire, England. It is located on the B4424 road about 1 mile (1.6 km) to the south of its junction with the main A449 Malvern to Worcester road. The River Severn runs down the eastern side of the village. In 2021, the parish of Powick had a population of 3,463.

The village school, Callow End Church of England Primary School, is part of the Diocese of Worcester Multi Academy Trust.

There are two pubs in the village, The Old Bush and The Bluebell. A popular walking spot is next to the village, namely The Old Hills .

Callow End Court is a Grade II listed French-style 19th century country house, located to the west of the village

The church of St James was built in 1888 by the sixth Earl Beauchamp as a secondary chapel within the parish of Powick.

The war memorial, next to the Callow End Club, is a Grade II listed monument, in the form of a hooded Portland stone cross.

Callow End is the former home of Stanbrook Abbey, a Benedictine convent that opened in 1838, and had a chapel added in 1871. The building is now a hotel.

Wheatfield Park is a residential park home estate to the north of the village. It was built in the grounds of the former Wheatfield Court manor house, which was left a ruin after a fire in 2004.

== Notable people ==
- Adam Barry (born 1981), English folk musician
- Eliot Bromley-Martin (1866-1946), cricketer born at St Cloud, Callow End (now the Severn Heights Nursing Home, Old Hills)
- Granville Bromley-Martin (1875-1941), cricketer born at St Cloud, Callow End
- Rosemary Hawley Jarman (1935-2015), author, lived in Orchard Way, Callow End until 1986
- Jonathan Wilks (born 1967), British diplomat
