= 1969 Weston-super-Mare by-election =

UK Parliamentary by-election

The 1969 Weston-super-Mare by-election of 27 March 1969 was held after the death of Conservative Member of Parliament (MP) David Webster. The seat was retained by the Conservatives with an increased majority.

== Electoral history ==
General election 1966: Weston-super-Mare
Party	Candidate	Votes	%	±%
Conservative	David Webster	27,733	52.08	
Labour	Melvyn E. Butcher	15,340	28.81	
Liberal	Ian D. McDonald	10,173	19.11	
Majority		12,393	23.27	
Turnout		53,246	79.06	
Conservative hold		Swing		

== Candidates ==
The Conservative candidate was 32 year-old Alfred William (Jerry) Wiggin. Educated at Eton College and Trinity College, Cambridge, he was a farmer with holdings in Worcestershire and Peeblesshire. He had previously stood as the party's candidate in Montgomeryshire in 1964 and 1966.

The Liberals selected a new candidate, 43 year-old Edward Deal. He was a local solicitor, who was a member of The Law Society and the British Legal Association. He had been educated at Uppingham School and Clare College, Cambridge. He was standing for Parliament for the first time.

The Labour Party selected 27 year-old Nicholas Bosanquet, an economic adviser at the National Board of Prices and Incomes. He was educated at Winchester College and Clare College, Cambridge.

== Result ==
Weston-super-Mare by-election, 1969
Party	Candidate	Votes	%	±%
Conservative	Jerry Wiggin	29,211	65.71	+13.63
Liberal	Edward Richard F. Deal	8,739	19.66	+0.55
Labour	Nicholas Bosanquet	6,504	14.63	−14.18
Majority		20,472	46.05	+22.78
Turnout		44,454	60.8	−17.7
Conservative hold		Swing		

== Aftermath ==
The result was one of three Conservative wins in by-elections held that day, with the party also retaining Brighton Pavilion and gaining Walthamstow East from Labour. Across the three contests there was an average swing of 16% from Labour to Conservative, which Conservative Shadow Home Secretary Quintin Hogg noted would give his party a comfortable majority in the House of Commons if repeated at the next general election. The next day's Glasgow Herald reported that the "dispiriting performance" by Labour in these first by-elections of 1969 raised questions as to when the tide would turn for the party and noted that "some Labour MPS feel in their bones" that the party could not recover to win the general election which would come within the next two years.
