= 1958 Weston-super-Mare by-election =

UK Parliamentary by-election

The 1958 Weston-super-Mare by-election was held on 12 June 1958. It was held after the Conservative MP, Sir Ian Leslie Orr-Ewing died. The seat was retained by the Conservative candidate David Webster.

Weston-super-Mare by-election 12th June 1958
Party	Candidate	Votes	%	±%
Conservative	David Webster	21,271	49.3	−13.4
Labour	Edward Hampton	11,295	26.2	−11.1
Liberal	Edward Taylor	10,588	24.5	New
Majority		9,976	23.1	−2.3
Turnout		43,154	72.2	−1.6
Conservative hold		Swing		
