= Eliot Bromley-Martin =

English cricketer (1866–1946)

Major Eliot George Bromley-Martin DL (2 October 1866 – 23 January 1946) was an English first-class cricketer: a right-handed batsman and right-arm slow bowler who played for Worcestershire County Cricket Club in the late 19th century. He was born in Callow End, Worcestershire, and was educated at Eton and New College, Oxford. He played in a trial match for Oxford University but did not appear in any first-class games for the team.

In the 1890s, Bromley-Martin was Honorary Secretary of Worcestershire as well as playing for the club in the Minor Counties Championship, a title Worcestershire won (singly or jointly) every year between 1895 and 1898. In 1899 the county was granted first-class status, and Bromley-Martin played nine times for them that year, his best bowling figures (and indeed the best of his first-class career) being the 4-33 he took against Yorkshire in Worcestershire's very first County Championship game.

Bromley-Martin played three games in 1900, one for Marylebone Cricket Club (MCC), but made no further first-class appearances thereafter. His brother Granville also played for Worcestershire, whilst his nephew Douglas Holland-Martin made two first-class appearances for the Royal Navy in 1928.

Bromley-Martin was commissioned in the Worcestershire Yeomanry in 1891 but resigned his commission in 1897 after being promoted to Lieutenant. He was a Deputy Lieutenant for the county of Worcestershire from 1896. At the outbreak of World War I he returned to the Army with the temporary rank of Major, later confirmed as a substantive rank. After the war he resigned his commission again and retained the rank of Major. He died in Walton, Radnorshire, Wales, at the age of 79.
