= 1934 Weston-super-Mare by-election =

UK Parliamentary by-election

The 1934 Weston-super-Mare by-election was held on 26 June 1934. The by-election was held due to the resignation of the incumbent Conservative MP, John Erskine to become Governor of Madras Presidency. It was won by the Conservative candidate Ian Orr-Ewing.

Weston-super-Mare by-election June 1934
Party	Candidate	Votes	%	±%
Conservative	Ian Orr-Ewing	21,203	61.5	−24.2
Liberal	Henry Scott-Stokes	7,551	21.9	New
Labour	Albert Edward Millett	5,715	16.6	+2.3
Majority		13,652	39.6	−31.8
Turnout		34,469		
Conservative hold		Swing		
