= Hackney London Borough Council elections =

Class of UK elections

A map showing the wards of Hackney from 2002 to 2014

Elections for Hackney Council in London take place every four years.

== Political control ==
Since the first election to the council in 1964 political control of the council has been held by the following parties:

Election	Overall control	Labour	Conservative	Lib Dem	Green
1964	Labour	60	–	–	–
1968	Conservative	27	31	2	–
1971	Labour	60	–	–	–
1974	Labour	60	–	–	–
1978	Labour	59	1	–	–
1982	Labour	50	3	7	–
1986	Labour	53	2	5	–
1990	Labour	48	4	8	–
1994	Labour	44	6	10	–
1998	No overall control	29	12	17	2
2002	Labour	45	9	3	–
2006	Labour	44	9	3	1
2010	Labour	50	4	3	–
2014	Labour	50	4	3	–
2018	Labour	52	5	–	–
2022	Labour	50	5	–	2
2026	Green	9	6	–	42

== Council elections ==
- 1964 Hackney London Borough Council election
- 1968 Hackney London Borough Council election
- 1971 Hackney London Borough Council election
- 1974 Hackney London Borough Council election
- 1978 Hackney London Borough Council election (boundary changes took place but the number of seats remained the same)
- 1982 Hackney London Borough Council election
- 1986 Hackney London Borough Council election
- 1990 Hackney London Borough Council election
- 1994 Hackney London Borough Council election (boundary changes took place but the number of seats remained the same) (Note: The City and London Borough Boundaries Order 1993) (Note: The East London Boroughs (London Borough Boundaries) (No. 2) Order 1993) (Note: The Essex and Greater London (County and London Borough Boundaries) Order 1993) (Note: The Hackney and Tower Hamlets (London Borough Boundaries) Order 1993) (Note: The Hackney, Haringey and Islington (London Borough Boundaries) Order 1993)
- 1998 Hackney London Borough Council election
- 2002 Hackney London Borough Council election (boundary changes reduced the number of seats by three)
- 2006 Hackney London Borough Council election
- 2010 Hackney London Borough Council election
- 2014 Hackney London Borough Council election (boundary changes took place but the number of seats remained the same)
- 2018 Hackney London Borough Council election
- 2022 Hackney London Borough Council election
- 2026 Hackney London Borough Council election

== Borough result maps ==
2002 results map

2006 results map

2010 results map

2014 results map

2018 results map

2022 results map

2026 results map

== By-election results ==
=== 1964–1968 ===
There were no by-elections.

=== 1968–1971 ===
Northwold by-election, 13 February 1969
Party	Candidate	Votes	%	±%
Labour	S. C. Davis	715		
Conservative	E. Laws	556		
Liberal	B. Franks	217		
Majority		159		
Turnout			18.5	
Labour hold		Swing		

Wenlock by-election, 5 June 1969
Party	Candidate	Votes	%	±%
Labour	J. P. Dowling	1,142		
Liberal	P. Macfarlane-Miller	321		
Conservative	W. Barber	288		
Majority		821		
Turnout			23.4	
Labour hold		Swing		

=== 1971–1974 ===
Downs by-election, 1 July 1971
Party	Candidate	Votes	%	±%
Labour	J. W. Hubbard	1,442		
Conservative	C. D. Sills	306		
Majority		1,136		
Turnout		11,750	15.0	
Labour hold		Swing		

Rectory by-election, 1 July 1971
Party	Candidate	Votes	%	±%
Labour	A. H. D. Waller	862		
Labour	M. J. Andrews	853		
Conservative	Stanley J. Sorrell	122		
Conservative	L. R. House	109		
Majority		731		
Turnout		6,172	16.3	
Labour hold		Swing		
Labour hold		Swing		

Springfield by-election, 16 March 1972
Party	Candidate	Votes	%	±%
Labour	J. Lissner	1,132		
Conservative	C. D. Sills	440		
Communist	Monty Goldman	98		
Majority		692		
Turnout		8,072	20.8	
Labour hold		Swing		

Defoe by-election, 14 June 1973
Party	Candidate	Votes	%	±%
Labour	J. Sweeney	939		
Conservative	C. D. Sills	513		
Majority		426		
Turnout		9,269	15.8	
Labour hold		Swing		

Downs by-election, 14 June 1973
Party	Candidate	Votes	%	±%
Labour	L. A. Walsh	1,309		
Conservative	K. S. H. Miller	245		
Majority		1,064		
Turnout		11,856	13.2	
Labour hold		Swing		

Victoria by-election, 14 June 1973
Party	Candidate	Votes	%	±%
Labour	J. A. Andrews	1,065		
Conservative	J. J. Lessner	125		
Majority		940		
Turnout		8,803	13.6	
Labour hold		Swing		

=== 1974–1978 ===
Kingsmead by-election, 15 May 1975
Party	Candidate	Votes	%	±%
Labour	Ivy L. Foster	1,201		
Conservative	John B. Baverstock	640		
National Front	Frank Simpson	522		
Liberal	Norman P. Joyce	264		
Majority		561		
Turnout		9,265	28.4	
Labour hold		Swing		

Springfield by-election, 17 November 1977
Party	Candidate	Votes	%	±%
Labour	George Armstrong	982		
Conservative	Christopher D. Sills	775		
National Front	Bernard W. Robinson	149		
Communist	Monty Goldman	70		
Liberal	Christopher A. Vecchi	66		
Majority		207		
Turnout		7,498	27.3	
Labour hold		Swing		

=== 1978–1982 ===
Wick by-election, 29 March 1979
Party	Candidate	Votes	%	±%
Labour	Isabella F. Callaghan	991		
Conservative	Christopher D. Sills	789		
National Front	Michael Sullivan	212		
Liberal	Russell B. Conway	60		
Residents	Georgina M. Fowkes	31		
Communist	David Boyes	28		
Majority		212		
Turnout		7,004	30.2	
Labour hold		Swing		

The by-election was called following the death of Cllr. John V. Hill.

Clissold by-election, 21 June 1979
Party	Candidate	Votes	%	±%
Labour	Howard R. Pallis	864		
Conservative	George A. C. Mills	315		
Liberal	Sylvia Anderson	163		
Communist	Les Skeates	42		
Majority		549		
Turnout		6,953	19.9	
Labour hold		Swing		

The by-election was called following the resignation of Cllr. Robert A. Dick.

Leabridge by-election, 20 March 1980
Party	Candidate	Votes	%	±%
Labour	Florence A. Newill	1,057		
Conservative	John B. Baverstock	570		
Majority		487		
Turnout		6,809	24.1	
Labour hold		Swing		

The by-election was called following the death of Cllr. Arthur C. Harrison.

Wenlock by-election, 9 October 1980
Party	Candidate	Votes	%	±%
Liberal	Jeffery D. Roberts	1,158		
Labour	Michael L. Ashton	508		
National Front	Derrick Day	200		
Conservative	Kenneth S. Lightwood	54		
Majority		650		
Turnout		5,234	36.8	
Liberal gain from Labour		Swing		

The by-election was called following the death of Cllr. John P. Dowling.

Chatham by-election, 30 October 1980
Party	Candidate	Votes	%	±%
Labour	Charles Clarke	1,219		
Conservative	George H. Jones	224		
Majority		995		
Turnout		6,840	21.2	
Labour hold		Swing		

The by-election was called following the death of Cllr Daniel West.

Rectory by-election, 30 October 1980
Party	Candidate	Votes	%	±%
Labour	John A. McCafferty	1,140		
Conservative	Moira B. Gardiner	239		
Communist	David Green	126		
Majority		901		
Turnout		6,230	24.2	
Labour hold		Swing		

The by-election was called following the resignation of Cllr Susan Gorman.

Springfield by-election, 7 May 1981
Party	Candidate	Votes	%	±%
Labour	Jack W. Davidson	1,506		
Conservative	Bernard Lansman	1,015		
Alliance	Heather Hill	303		
Majority		491		
Turnout		6,740	42.4	
Labour hold		Swing		

The by-election was called following the resignation of Cllr George Armstrong.

Westdown by-election, 3 December 1981
Party	Candidate	Votes	%	±%
Labour	Denise Robson	418		
Alliance	Roy Evans	267		
Conservative	Geoffrey M. Lenox-Smith	51		
Communist	Thomas H. Collins	29		
Majority		151		
Turnout		3,570	21.7	
Labour hold		Swing		

The by-election was called following the death of Cllr John Wobey.

=== 1982–1986 ===
North Defoe by-election, 2 December 1982
Party	Candidate	Votes	%	±%
Labour	Gery Lawless	752		
Conservative	Pamela Y. Sills	257		
Alliance	Denis J. V. Murray	114		
Communist	Peggy Blatchford	37		
Majority		495		
Turnout		3,489	33.4	
Labour hold		Swing		

The by-election was called following the resignation of Cllr Jack Davidson.

Brownswood by-election, 17 March 1983
Party	Candidate	Votes	%	±%
Labour	Stephen Scott	819		
Conservative	Stephen R. C. Maslen	525		
Communist	Andrew Massey	94		
Majority		294		
Turnout		5,439	26.5	
Labour hold		Swing		

The by-election was called following the death of Cllr Henry Levy.

Leabridge by-election, 29 November 1984
Party	Candidate	Votes	%	±%
Labour	Breen L. L. Lewis	744		
SDP	Alastair T. Tainsh	392		
Conservative	Gerard V. M. Bulger	313		
Ecology	David J. Fitzpatrick	153		
New Hackney Liberal Focus	Raymond P. White	70		
Majority		352		
Turnout		6,721	24.9	
Labour hold		Swing		

The by-election was called following the death of Cllr Christopher Baxter.

Clissold by-election, 28 February 1985
Party	Candidate	Votes	%	±%
Labour	Philip Stott	1,258		
Alliance	Mourad A. Fleming	459		
Conservative	Eric Ollerenshaw	218		
Communist	Jim Westwood	59		
Majority		799		
Turnout		6,966	28.7	
Labour hold		Swing		

The by-election was called following the resignation of Cllr Mervyn Jones.

Haggerston by-election, 2 May 1985
Party	Candidate	Votes	%	±%
Liberal	William J. Upex	881		
Labour	Mary F. White	746		
Conservative	Thomas Robinson	132		
New Hackney Liberal Focus	Raymond P. White	36		
Majority		135		
Turnout		4,744	38.1	
Liberal hold		Swing		

The by-election was called following the resignation of Cllr Victoria Lubbock.

Rectory by-election, 2 May 1985
Party	Candidate	Votes	%	±%
Labour	Felicity M. Harvest	1,300		
Conservative	Romauld McMillan	205		
New Hackney Liberal Focus	Jeffrey Marcus	151		
Communist	David Green	79		
Majority		1,095		
Turnout		6,372	27.4	
Labour hold		Swing		

The by-election was called following the resignation of Cllr Brian Weller.

Wenlock by-election, 6 June 1985
Party	Candidate	Votes	%	±%
Liberal	Doreen J. Warne	1,133		
Labour	Carole A. Young	614		
Conservative	Roy F. Julian	65		
New Hackney Liberal Focus	Kenneth King	43		
Majority		517		
Turnout		5,380	34.7	
Liberal hold		Swing		

The by-election was called following the resignation of Cllr Walter Carmoody.

=== 1986–1990 ===
Eastdown by-election, 11 December 1986
Party	Candidate	Votes	%	±%
Labour	Shuja Shaikh	479		
Conservative	Christopher D. Sills	237		
New Hackney Liberal Focus	Raymond P. White	161		
Green	Kevin J. Solan	90		
Humanist	Paul Whitehouse	10		
Majority		242		
Turnout		6,925	14.2	
Labour hold		Swing		

The by-election was called following the death of Cllr Robert Owen.

Moorfields by-election, 5 March 1987
Party	Candidate	Votes	%	±%
Liberal	Luke J. Maughan-Pawsey	1,097		
Labour	Zacchaeus B. Ojo	336		
Conservative	Robert T. Richier	103		
Majority		763		
Turnout		5,013	30.7	
Liberal hold		Swing		

The by-election was called following the disqualification of Cllr Pierre Royan.

Haggerston by-election, 29 October 1987
Party	Candidate	Votes	%	±%
Labour	Simon S. Matthews	562		
Liberal	Geoffrey N. Taylor	481		
Conservative	Michael C. N. Brown	237		
Communist	David Green	17		
Majority		81		
Turnout		4,908	26.6	
Labour gain from Liberal		Swing		

The by-election was called following the resignation of Cllr Andrew Elder.

Wenlock by-election, 29 October 1987
Party	Candidate	Votes	%	±%
Liberal	Gillian Moseley	823		
Labour	Madeleine M. Spanswick	336		
Conservative	Dorothy J. Lyons	168		
Majority		487		
Turnout		5,370	24.8	
Liberal hold		Swing		

The by-election was called following the resignation of Cllr J. Roberts.

De Beauvoir by-election, 25 February 1988
Party	Candidate	Votes	%	±%
Liberal	Thomas A. Brake	613		
Labour	David J. F. Pollock	512		
Conservative	Christopher D. Sills	398		
Green	Jonathan Edwards	127		
Majority		101		
Turnout		7,020	23.6	
Liberal gain from Labour		Swing		

The by-election was called following the resignation of Cllr John Lettice.

Chatham by-election, 16 June 1988
Party	Candidate	Votes	%	±%
Labour	Foster Akusu	624		
Conservative	Dorothy J. Lyons	613		
Majority		11		
Turnout		6,593	18.9	
Labour hold		Swing		

The by-election was called following the resignation of Cllr James Holland.

Clissold by-election, 16 June 1988
Party	Candidate	Votes	%	±%
Labour	Lois Radice	970		
Conservative	Adrian P. Burbanks	367		
Green	David J. Merryweather	189		
Communist	David Green	82		
Majority		603		
Turnout		6,938	23.3	
Labour hold		Swing		

The by-election was called following the resignation of Cllr Philip Stott.

New River by-election, 16 June 1988
Party	Candidate	Votes	%	±%
Conservative	Bernard Aussenberg	1,086		
Conservative	Christopher D. Sills	1,012		
Labour	Andrew Buttress	792		
Labour	James J. D. Macfoy	747		
Green	David J. Fitzpatrick	395		
Majority		220		
Turnout		7,404	29.1	
Conservative gain from Labour Co-op		Swing		
Conservative gain from Labour		Swing		

The by-election was called following the resignations of Cllrs David Clark and Sheila Webb.

Rectory by-election, 25 August 1988
Party	Candidate	Votes	%	±%
Labour	James J. N. Macfoy	807		
Labour	Sharon R. Patrick	775		
Conservative	Adrian P. Burbanks	355		
Conservative	Michael J. Donoghue	336		
Liberal Democrats	Colin Beadle	257		
Liberal Democrats	Roderick P. Francis	232		
Communist	Caroline A. Coles	119		
Green	Marguerite A. Borris	78		
Green	Clara Slater	76		
Majority		420		
Turnout		6,524	24.7	
Labour hold		Swing		
Labour hold		Swing		

The by-election was called following the resignations of Cllrs Felicity Harvest and Anthony Horrocks.

Springfield by-election, 8 September 1988
Party	Candidate	Votes	%	±%
Labour	Abraham Lew	1,190		
Conservative	Jacob M. Landau	1,135		
SDP	Allan D. Williams	62		
Humanist	Roger Park	10		
Majority		55		
Turnout		6,842	35.2	
Labour hold		Swing		

The by-election was called following the resignation of Cllr Edward Barns.

Northwold by-election, 6 October 1988
Party	Candidate	Votes	%	±%
Labour	Paul T. Foley	674		
Conservative	Eileen Baldock	579		
Green	Clare E. Gilbert	95		
Liberal Democrats	Christopher McFadden	55		
Humanist	Roger Park	5		
Majority		95		
Turnout		6,482	21.9	
Labour hold		Swing		

The by-election was called following the resignation of Cllr Peter Chowney.

Kings Park by-election, 20 April 1989
Party	Candidate	Votes	%	±%
Labour	Robert Chapman	771		
Conservative	Gregory A. Alake	353		
Green	Tomasina M. M. Morahan	78		
Majority		418		
Turnout		4,894	24.7	
Labour hold		Swing		

The by-election was called following the resignation of Cllr Brynley Heaven.

Westdown by-election, 15 June 1989
Party	Candidate	Votes	%	±%
Labour	Jonathan Slater	829		
Conservative	Joan Mertens	238		
Communist	Maurice S. McCracken	82		
Majority		591		
Turnout		3,727	31.6	
Labour hold		Swing		

The by-election was called following the resignation of Cllr John Bloom.

Haggerston by-election, 16 November 1989
Party	Candidate	Votes	%	±%
Liberal Democrats	Colin Beadle	535		
Labour	Anthony Goodchild	476		
Conservative	Stephen L. Mertens	212		
Green	Leonard Lucas	64		
Majority		59		
Turnout		4663	27.8	
Liberal Democrats hold		Swing		

The by-election was called following the resignation of Cllr William Upex.

Westdown by-election, 18 January 1990
Party	Candidate	Votes	%	±%
Labour	Jan E. Burnell	469		
Conservative	Joan Mertens	83		
Majority		386		
Turnout		3,756	14.9	
Labour hold		Swing		

The by-election was called following the resignation of Cllr Lloyd King.

=== 1990–1994 ===
De Beauvoir by-election, 21 February 1991
Party	Candidate	Votes	%	±%
Conservative	Philip McCullough	821	46.3	
Liberal Democrats	David R. Green	445	25.1	
Labour	David M. Green	442	24.9	
Green	David R. Cuthbertson	67	3.8	
Turnout			27.3	
Conservative gain from Liberal Democrats		Swing		

The by-election was called following the resignation of Cllr Thomas Brake.

Victoria by-election, 14 March 1991
Party	Candidate	Votes	%	±%
Liberal Democrats	Howard Hyman	784	31.9	
Labour	Isaac Leibowitz	721	29.3	
Conservative	Christopher D. Sills	682	27.7	
Green	Leonard Lucas	271	11.0	
Turnout			31.8	
Liberal Democrats gain from Labour		Swing		

The by-election was called following the disqualification of Cllr Ali Uddin.

Northfield by-election, 2 May 1991
Party	Candidate	Votes	%	±%
Labour	Denise M. Robson	823	39.9	
Conservative	Michael J. Donoghue	812	39.4	
Liberal Democrats	Zalkind Y. Wise	426	20.7	
Turnout			33.9	
Labour hold		Swing		

The by-election was called following the resignation of Cllr Jane Linden.

Queensbridge by-election, 31 October 1991
Party	Candidate	Votes	%	±%
Labour	Anthony G. M. Allen	764	34.0	
Liberal Democrats	Katherine Wolfe	743	33.1	
Conservative	Julia P. Stent	738	32.9	
Turnout			31.6	
Labour hold		Swing		

The by-election was called following the resignation of Cllr Jean Khote.

De Beauvoir by-election, 7 May 1992
Party	Candidate	Votes	%	±%
Conservative	Julia P. Stent	1,098	53.6	
Labour	Madeleine M. Spanswick	528	25.8	
Liberal Democrats	Simon H. Taylor	423	20.6	
Turnout			34.8	
Conservative gain from Liberal Democrats		Swing		

The by-election was called following the disqualification of Cllr Pauline Kerridge-Smith.

Northwold by-election, 7 May 1992
Party	Candidate	Votes	%	±%
Labour	Isaac Leibowitz	969		
Conservative	Ian D. Leask	958		
Labour	Simon B. Parkes	749		
Conservative	Christopher D. Sills	741		
Turnout			33.6	
Labour hold		Swing		
Conservative gain from Labour		Swing		

The by-election was called following the resignations of Cllrs Paul Foley and Francis Reedy.

Wick by-election, 19 November 1992
Party	Candidate	Votes	%	±%
Liberal Democrats	Peter D. Hoye	798	41.6	
Labour	Samantha A. Lloyd	623	32.5	
Conservative	Maureen B. Middleton	464	24.2	
Green	Paul A. Thomas	34	1.8	
Turnout			31.0	
Liberal Democrats gain from Labour		Swing		

The by-election was called following the resignation of Cllr Georgina Nicholas.

Leabridge by-election, 8 July 1993
Party	Candidate	Votes	%	±%
Labour	Christopher J. Bryant	757	38.3	
Conservative	Heather E. Whitelaw	684	34.6	
Liberal Democrats	Linda Woodard	449	22.7	
Independent Labour	Ahmed I. Khote	86	4.4	
Turnout			34.1	
Labour hold		Swing		

The by-election was called following the resignation of Cllr Andrew Buttress.

=== 1994–1998 ===
De Beauvoir by-election, 17 November 1994
Party	Candidate	Votes	%	±%
Conservative	Christopher P. O Leary	689		
Labour	Simon M. Nicholls	590		
Liberal Democrats	Irene S. Fawkes	556		
Majority		99		
Turnout			29.7	
Conservative gain from Labour		Swing		

The by-election was called following the resignation of Cllr John Richards.

Moorfields by-election, 30 November 1995
Party	Candidate	Votes	%	±%
Conservative	David J. Candlin	486		
Liberal Democrats	Kay M. Stone	467		
Labour	Keith A. Meredith	362		
Majority		19		
Turnout			30.3	
Conservative gain from Liberal Democrats		Swing		

The by-election was called following the resignation of Cllr Alison Rothwell.

De Beauvoir by-election, 27 June 1996
Party	Candidate	Votes	%	±%
Labour	Peter J. I. Snell	816		
Conservative	Leslie Stoners	784		
Liberal Democrats	Merlin B. C. Milner	173		
BNP	Victor Dooley	50		
Majority		32		
Turnout			29	
Labour hold		Swing		

The by-election was called following the resignation of Cllr Madeleine Spanswick.

Wick by-election, 27 June 1996
Party	Candidate	Votes	%	±%
Liberal Democrats	Neil Hughes	870		
Labour	Samantha A. Lloyd	796		
Conservative	Michael J. P. Moriarty	295		
BNP	William Binding	56		
Majority		74		
Turnout			33.1	
Liberal Democrats hold		Swing		

The by-election was called following the resignation of Cllr Peter Hoye.

Dalston by-election, 15 August 1996
Party	Candidate	Votes	%	±%
Liberal Democrats	David A. J. Bentley	787		
Labour	Michael R. D. Butler	778		
Conservative	Leslie Stoners	156		
Majority		9		
Turnout			30.4	
Liberal Democrats gain from Labour		Swing		

The by-election was called following the resignation of Cllr Helen Cooper.

Moorfields by-election, 10 July 1997
Party	Candidate	Votes	%	±%
Conservative	Lorraine C. Fahey	697		
Labour	Dylan Jeffrey	419		
Liberal Democrats	Patricia M. McGuinness	363		
BNP	Victor J. Dooley	45		
Independent	Nicolas Lewkowicz	30		
Majority		278		
Turnout			33.9	
Conservative gain from Liberal Democrats		Swing		

The by-election was called following the death of Cllr Iain Pigg.

South Defoe by-election, 7 November 1996
Party	Candidate	Votes	%	±%
Labour	Jules Pipe	611		
Liberal Democrats	Anthony S. Terrill	406		
Conservative	Julian S. Roche	199		
Green	Paul A. Thomas	95		
Independent	Nicolas Lewkowicz	80		
Majority		205		
Turnout			35.5	
Labour hold		Swing		

The by-election was called following the resignation of Cllr Anne Miller.

=== 1998–2002 ===
Clissold by-election, 22 October 1998
Party	Candidate	Votes	%	±%
Labour	Vicki L. Munro	747		
Liberal Democrats	Paula Grainger	689		
Green	Julie A. Hathaway	264		
Conservative	Bruce Spenser	147		
Independent Labour	Kevin V. Johnston	66		
Majority		58		
Turnout			32	
Labour hold		Swing		

The by-election was called following the resignation of Cllr Lorraine Monk.

North Defoe by-election, 21 January 1999
Party	Candidate	Votes	%	±%
Labour	James E. Carswell	581		
Green	Mischa A. Borris	548		
Liberal Democrats	Sarah-Jane Prattent	100		
Conservative	Yann Leclerq	42		
Ind. Socialist	Anne Murphy	37		
Majority		33		
Turnout			37.3	
Labour gain from Green		Swing		

The by-election was called following the resignation of Cllr Paul Thomas.

Rectory by-election, 15 July 1999
Party	Candidate	Votes	%	±%
Labour	Samantha A. Lloyd	941		
Conservative	Shuja Shaikh	475		
Liberal Democrats	Steven R. Laing	163		
Green	Isabel Lane	122		
Independent	Breen L. L. Lewis	84		
Majority		466		
Turnout			32	
Labour hold		Swing		

The by-election was called following the resignation of Cllr Irfan Malik.

Kings Park by-election, 13 January 2000
Party	Candidate	Votes	%	±%
Labour	Sunday A. Ogunwobi	582		
Liberal Democrats	Kenrick E. Hanson	190		
Conservative	James A. Spencer	89		
Majority		392		
Turnout			23.6	
Labour hold		Swing		

The by-election was called following the disqualification of Cllr Simon Parkes.

Wick by-election, 12 October 2000
Party	Candidate	Votes	%	±%
Labour	Jessica Webb	496		
Liberal Democrats	Kenrick E. Hanson	423		
Socialist Alliance	Diana Swingler	134		
Conservative	Alexander Ellis	99		
Independent	Adrian K. Peacock	25		
Majority		73		
Turnout			18.4	
Labour gain from Liberal Democrats		Swing		

The by-election was called following the resignation of Cllr Neil Hughes.

Northwold by-election, 7 June 2001
Party	Candidate	Votes	%	±%
Labour	Michael B. Desmond	1260		
Liberal Democrats	Dawood E. Akhoon	645		
Green	Isabel Lane	342		
Conservative	Pamela Y. Sills	251		
Socialist Alliance	Diana L. Swingler	187		
Independent	John G. Kelly	145		
Hackney First	Cambell R. McK. Matheson	145		
Independent	Adrian K. Peacock	24		
Majority		615		
Turnout			50.5	
Labour gain from Liberal Democrats		Swing		

The by-election was called following the resignation of Cllr Zev Lieberman.

Queensbridge by-election, 7 June 2001
Party	Candidate	Votes	%	±%
Labour	Andrew Travers	1907		
Liberal Democrats	Celya A. Maxted	724		
Conservative	Andrew Boff	355		
Socialist Alliance	Michael L. Matthews-Dublin	202		
Majority		1183		
Turnout			51.7	
Labour hold		Swing		

The by-election was called following the disqualification of Cllr Vernon Williams.

Springfield by-election, 7 June 2001
Party	Candidate	Votes	%	±%
Conservative	Jacob Landau	1269		
Labour	Linda A. Kelly	1227		
Hackney First	Bruce Spenser	401		
Liberal Democrats	Steven R. Laing	205		
Green	William J. Chidley	169		
Socialist Alliance	Anetta P. Gluckstein	124		
Majority		42		
Turnout			51.5	
Conservative hold		Swing		

The by-election was called following the resignation of Cllr Isaac Leibowitz.

=== 2002–2006 ===
King s Park by-election, 10 December 2002
Party	Candidate	Votes	%	±%
Labour	Yinusa M. Akinrele	905		
Conservative	Paul S. Gray	211		
Liberal Democrats	David R. Ash	144		
Green	Daniel Bates	139		
Socialist Alliance	Will McMahon	121		
Majority		694		
Turnout			22.7	
Labour hold		Swing		

The by-election was called following the resignation of Cllr Jules Pipe.

Leabridge by-election, 10 December 2002
Party	Candidate	Votes	%	±%
Labour	Ian Rathbone	780		
Green	Mischa A. Borris	366		
Conservative	Samantha M. Wood	304		
Liberal Democrats	Paula Southwood	189		
Socialist Alliance	Richard Peacock	126		
Majority		414		
Turnout			25.8	
Labour hold		Swing		

The by-election was called following the resignation of Cllr Louise McQuoid.

New River by-election, 10 June 2004
Party	Candidate	Votes	%	±%
Conservative	Harvey Odze	951		
Labour	Nicholas H. Conway	781		
Liberal Democrats	Emanuel Silver	371		
Green	Grace Gedge	267		
Majority		170		
Turnout			37.6	
Conservative hold		Swing		

The by-election was called following the resignation of Cllr Schneur Odze.

Queensbridge by-election, 20 January 2005
Party	Candidate	Votes	%	±%
Conservative	Andrew Boff	696		
Labour	Patrick Vernon	595		
Liberal Democrats	Eugene Egan	334		
Respect	Diane L. Swingler	291		
Majority		101		
Turnout			28.2	
Conservative gain from Labour		Swing		

The by-election was called following the resignation of Cllr Nihal Fernando.

Hoxton by-election, 5 May 2005
Party	Candidate	Votes	%	±%
Labour	Jonathan McShane	1443		
Conservative	Alexander Ellis	649		
Liberal Democrats	Sylvia Anderson	586		
Independent	William Butler	310		
Green	Cedric Knight	201		
Respect	Dean Ryan	113		
Majority		794		
Turnout			44.5	
Labour hold		Swing		

The by-election was called following the resignation of Cllr David Manion.

=== 2006–2010 ===
Springfield By-Election 13 December 2007
Party	Candidate	Votes	%	±%
Conservative	Michael Levy	1,244	59.0	+16.1
Labour	Zina Munaf	590	28.0	+0.4
Liberal Democrats	Brian Stone	113	5.4	−4.8
Green	Gordon Hodgson	85	4.0	−9.5
Christian	Maxine Hargreaves	40	1.9	+1.9
Communist	Monty Goldman	37	1.8	−4.0
Majority		654	31.0	
Turnout		2,109	33.0	
Conservative hold		Swing		

The by-election was called following the resignation of Cllr Eric Ollerenshaw.

Stoke Newington Central by-election, 29 January 2009
Party	Candidate	Votes	%	±%
Labour	Louisa Thomson	1162		
Green	Matthew Hanley	783		
Liberal Democrats	Diana Swingler	134		
Conservative	Patricia Napier	169		
Direct Democracy (Communist)	Nusret Sen	20		
Majority		379		
Turnout			30.8	
Labour hold		Swing		

The by-election was called following the resignation of Cllr James Carswell.

=== 2010–2014 ===
New River by-election, 16 September 2010
Party	Candidate	Votes	%	±%
Conservative	Benzion Papier	1567		
Labour	Jonathan Burke	1007		
Green	Stuart Coggins	77		
Liberal Democrats	Benjamin Mathis	61		
Independent	Darren Fraser	26		
Turnout				
Conservative hold		Swing		

The by-election was called following the death of Cllr Maureen Middleton.

Hackney Central by-election, 3 May 2012
Party	Candidate	Votes	%	±%
Labour	Ben Hayhurst	2438		
Green	Mustafa Korel	545		
Liberal Democrats	Pauline Pearce	394		
Conservative	Andrew Boff	296		
Turnout			41.5%	
Labour hold		Swing		

The by-election was called following the resignation of Cllr Alan Laing.

=== 2014–2018 ===
Hackney Downs by-election, 5 May 2016
Party	Candidate	Votes	%	±%
Labour	Sem Moema	2,614	59.8	−0.4
Green	Alastair Binnie-Lubbock	1,067	24.4	+0.4
Conservative	Nicola Benjamin	350	8.0	+1.9
Liberal Democrats	Mohammed Sadiq	338	7.7	−2.0
Majority		1,547		
Turnout		4,369	58%	
Labour hold		Swing		

Stoke Newington by-election, 5 May 2016
Party	Candidate	Votes	%	±%
Labour	Patrick Moule	3,241	61.6	+5.8
Green	Halita Obineche	1,132	21.5	−6.0
Conservative	Christopher Sills	450	8.6	+1.6
Liberal Democrats	Victor De Almeida	303	5.8	−0.3
TUSC	Mick Cotter	136	2.6	−1.2
Majority		2,109		
Turnout		5,262	63%	
Labour hold		Swing		

Hackney Central by-election, 21 July 2016
Party	Candidate	Votes	%	±%
Labour	Sophie Conway	1,354	75.2%	+11.2%
Green	Siobhan MacMahon	178	9.9%	−13.0%
Liberal Democrats	Russell French	113	6.3%	−1.1%
Conservative	Christopher Sills	101	5.6%	−0.2%
Independent	Mustafa Korel	55	3.1%	N/A
Majority		1,176	65.3%	+24.2%
Turnout		1,801	18.6%	−18.5%
Labour hold		Swing		

The by-election was triggered by the resignation of Cllr Sophie Linden, following her appointment as the London Deputy Mayor for Policing and Crime.

Hoxton West by-election, 3 November 2016
Party	Candidate	Votes	%	±%
Labour	Yvonne Maxwell	951	68.3	+11.5
Conservative	Christopher Sills	185	13.3	+1.2
Liberal Democrats	Chantel Encavey	133	9.6	+3.2
Green	Morgan James	123	8.8	−11.4
Majority		766	55.0	
Turnout		1,392		
Labour hold		Swing		

The by-election was triggered by the election of Cllr Philip Glanville as Mayor of Hackney.

=== 2018–2022 ===
Victoria by-election, 18 October 2018
Party	Candidate	Votes	%	±%
Labour	Penny Wrout	1,311	59.8	−9.7
Liberal Democrats	Pippa Morgan	436	19.2	+10.3
Green	Wendy Robinson	296	13.0	−4.0
Conservative	Christopher Sills	148	6.5	−0.3
Women's Equality	Harini Iyengar	84	3.7	+3.7
Majority		875	38.5	
Turnout		2,275		
Labour hold		Swing		

The by-election was triggered by the resignation of Cllr Alex Kuye.

Clissold by-election, 12 December 2019
Party	Candidate	Votes	%	±%
Labour	Kofo David	3,784	56.3	−6.6
Green	Marie Remy	1,597	23.8	+1.8
Liberal Democrats	Teresa Clark	612	9.1	−1.4
Conservative	Carmen Williams	440	6.5	+1.9
Women's Equality	Tabitha Morton	287	4.3	+4.3
Majority		2,187	32.5	
Turnout		6,720		
Labour hold		Swing		

The by-election was triggered by the resignation of Cllr Ned Hercock.

Hoxton East and Shoreditch by-election, 6 May 2021
Party	Candidate	Votes	%	±%
Labour	Anya Sizer	1,504	54.0	−10.8
Green	Charlotte Owusu-Allen	454	16.3	+1.3
Conservative	Jasmine Cannon-Ikurusi	307	11.0	+2.8
Liberal Democrats	Helen Baxter	253	9.1	+0.9
Independent	Niall Crowley	222	8.0	+8.0
TUSC	Chris Newby	47	1.7	−2.0
Majority		1,050	37.7	
Turnout		2,787		
Labour hold		Swing		

The by-election was triggered by the resignation of Cllr Feryal Clark MP.

King's Park by-election, 6 May 2021
Party	Candidate	Votes	%	±%
Labour	Lynne Troughton	2,484	64.1	−6.4
Green	Peter Jones	636	16.4	+1.7
Conservative	Sandy Ngongo-Nkolomoni	279	7.2	+1.0
Independent	Clair Battaglino	151	3.9	+3.9
Liberal Democrats	Elizabeth Prochaska	136	3.5	−2.4
Independent	Ben Mathis	120	3.1	+3.1
TUSC	Naomi Byron	72	1.9	+1.9
Majority		1,848	47.7	
Turnout		3,878		
Labour hold		Swing		

The by-election was triggered by the resignation of Cllr Tom Rahilly.

Stamford Hill West by-election, 6 May 2021
Party	Candidate	Votes	%	±%
Conservative	Hershy Lisser	1,456	50.3	−1.4
Labour	Rosemary Sales	1,192	41.2	+1.3
Green	Johnny Dixon	189	6.5	+0.9
Liberal Democrats	Anthony Harms	59	2.0	−0.7
Majority		264	9.1	
Turnout		2,896		
Conservative hold		Swing		

The by-election was triggered by the resignation of Cllr Aron Klein.

Woodberry Down by-election, 6 May 2021
Party	Candidate	Votes	%	±%
Labour	Sarah Young	1,680	57.7	−13.9
Green	Alice Bennett	535	18.4	+7.2
Conservative	Ari Feferkorn	530	18.2	+8.3
Liberal Democrats	Alton Hassan	167	5.7	−1.6
Majority		1,145	39.3	
Turnout		2,912		
Labour hold		Swing		

The by-election was triggered by the resignation of Cllr Jon Burke.

=== 2022–2026 ===
De Beauvoir by-election, 7 July 2022
Party	Candidate	Votes	%	±%
Labour	Joe Walker	758	41.8	−15.5
Green	Tyrone Scott	731	40.3	+18.3
Liberal Democrats	Thrusie Maurseth-Cahill	133	7.3	−5.1
Ind. Network	Kelly Reid	83	4.6	−3.8
Conservative	Oliver Hall	82	4.5	+4.5
Women's Equality	Kristal Bayliss	27	1.5	+1.5
Majority		27	1.5	
Turnout		1,814		
Labour hold		Swing		

The by-election was triggered by the resignation of Cllr Tom Dewey.

Cazenove by-election, 18 January 2024
Party	Candidate	Votes	%	±%
Conservative	Ian Sharer	1,623	53.8	+47.5
Labour	Laura Pascal	935	31.0	−12.2
Green	Tamara Micner	387	12.8	+1.2
Liberal Democrats	Dave Raval	73	2.4	−34.5
Majority		688	22.8	
Turnout		3,018		
Conservative gain from Labour		Swing		

The by-election was triggered by the election of Cllr Caroline Woodley as Mayor of Hackney.

De Beauvoir by-election, 2 May 2024
Party	Candidate	Votes	%	±%
Labour	Jasmine Martins	1,316	46.7	−10.6
Green	Antionette Fernandez	1,197	42.5	+20.5
Conservative	Tareke Gregg	174	6.2	+6.2
Liberal Democrats	Thrusie Cahill	129	4.6	−7.8
Majority		119	4.2	
Turnout		2,816		
Labour hold		Swing		

The by-election was triggered by the resignation of Labour councillor Polly Billington.

Hoxton East and Shoreditch Ward by-election, 2 May 2024
Party	Candidate	Votes	%	±%
Labour	Faruk Tinaz	1,587	59.2	+6.4
Green	Liam Davis	560	20.9	+6.3
Conservative	Samuel Adele	318	11.9	+2.9
Liberal Democrats	Dave Raval	217	8.1	−2.7
Majority		1,027	38.3	
Turnout		2,682		
Labour hold		Swing		

The by-election was triggered by the resignation of Labour councillor Steve Race.

Cazenove by-election, 4 July 2024
Party	Candidate	Votes	%	±%
Labour	Patrick Pinkerton	1,974	37.4	−5.8
Conservative	Hershi Moskovits	1,838	34.8	+28.5
Green	Tamara Micner	1170	22.2	+10.6
Liberal Democrats	Ken Gabbott-Rolph	150	2.8	−34.1
Independent	Faisal Ibji	147	2.8	+2.8
Majority		136	2.6	
Turnout		5,279		
Labour hold		Swing		

The by-election was triggered by the resignation of Labour councillor Eluzer Goldberg.

London Fields by-election, 12 September 2024
Party	Candidate	Votes	%	±%
Labour	George Gooch	746	54.1	−6.9
Independent	Sarah Byrne	437	31.7	+31.7
Conservative	Diana Mikolajewska	72	5.2	+5.2
Liberal Democrats	Peter Friend	71	5.2	−7.9
Workers Party	Olivia Taylor	52	3.8	+3.8
Majority		309	22.4	
Turnout		1,378		
Labour hold		Swing		

The by-election was triggered by the resignation of Labour councillor Lee Laudat-Scott.

Stoke Newington by-election, 12 September 2024
Party	Candidate	Votes	%	±%
Green	Liam Davis	1,253	53.0	+23.4
Labour	Zak Davies-Khan	945	40.0	−12.2
Liberal Democrats	Thrusie Maurseth-Cahill	78	3.3	−5.7
Conservative	Tareke Gregg	74	3.1	−3.3
Independent	Tan Bui	12	0.5	+0.5
Majority		308	13.0	
Turnout		2,362		
Green gain from Labour		Swing		

The by-election was triggered by the resignation of Labour councillor Mete Coban, following his appointment as the London Deputy Mayor for Environment and Energy.

=== 2026–2030 ===
Dalston by-election, 25 June 2026
Party	Candidate	Votes	%	±%
Green	Manal Massalha	549	57.7	
Labour	Grace Adebayo	342	36.0	
Reform	Ivon Fleming	26	2.7	
Liberal Democrats	Peter Munro	24	2.5	
Conservative	Jerry Sulaiman	10	1.1	
Majority		207	21.8	
Turnout		951		
Green hold		Swing		

The by-election was triggered by the election of Cllr Zoë Garbett as Mayor of Hackney.

Hackney Central by-election, 25 June 2026
Party	Candidate	Votes	%	±%
Green	Noah Birksted-Breen	676	45.3	
Labour	Sheila Suso-Runge	624	41.9	
Liberal Democrats	Ken Gabbott-Rolph	83	5.6	
Reform	Vahid Almasi	59	4.0	
Conservative	Serban Bay	49	3.3	
Majority		52	3.5	
Turnout		1,491		
Green hold		Swing		

The by-election was triggered by the disqualification of Cllr James Tilden due to his employment by the council.

== Mayoral by-elections ==
2016 Hackney mayoral by-election
Party	Candidate	1st round		2nd round			1st round votesTransfer votes, 2nd round
Party	Candidate	Total	Of round	Transfers	Total	Of round	1st round votesTransfer votes, 2nd round
Labour	Philip Glanville	22,595	68.9%				
Green	Samir Jeraj	4,338	13.2%				
Conservative	Amy Gray	3,533	10.8%				
Liberal Democrats	Dave Raval	1,818	5.5%				
One Love	Dawa Ma	494	1.5%				
Turnout		32,778	18.6%				
Labour hold							

2023 Hackney mayoral by-election
Party	Candidate	Votes	%	±%
Labour	Caroline Woodley	18,474	49.8	−9.3
Green	Zoë Garbett	9,075	24.5	+7.5
Conservative	Simche Steinberger	5,039	13.6	+0.2
Liberal Democrats	Simon de Deney	1,879	5.1	−2.0
Independent	Peter Smorthit	1,382	3.7	New
TUSC	Anooesjka Valent	1,265	3.4	New
Labour hold				
