= Wick (ward) =

Electoral ward in London Borough of Hackney, England

- Former electoral ward for the Hackney London Borough Council
- Wick ward boundaries from 2002 to 2014
- Borough: Hackney
- County: Greater London
- Population: 11,734 (2011)
- Major settlements: Hackney Wick
- Area: 0.5066 square kilometres (0.1956 sq mi)

Former electoral ward
- Created: 1965
- Abolished: 2014
- Councillors: 3
- Replaced by: Hackney Wick
- ONS code: 00AMGU (2002–2014)
- GSS code: E05000249 (2002–2014)

Wick was an electoral ward in the London Borough of Hackney from 1965 to 2014. The ward was first used in the 1964 elections and last used for the 2010 elections. It returned three councillors to Hackney London Borough Council.

Wick ward had a total population of 11,027, increasing to 11,734 at the 2011 Census. This compares with the average ward population within the borough of 10,674.

== 2002–2014 Hackney council elections ==
There was a revision of ward boundaries in Hackney in 2002.

=== 2010 election ===
The election on 6 May 2010 took place on the same day as the United Kingdom general election.

2010 Hackney London Borough Council election: Wick
| Party | Candidate | Votes | % | ±% |
|---|---|---|---|---|
| Labour | Chris Kennedy | 2,339 | 46.3 | |
| Labour | Jessica Webb | 2,243 | | |
| Labour | Anntoinette Bramble | 2,186 | | |
| Green | Sally Zlotowitz | 942 | 18.7 | |
| Liberal Democrats | Ben See | 932 | 18.5 | |
| Liberal Democrats | Mustafa Korel | 857 | | |
| Conservative | Stephen Selby | 525 | 10.4 | |
| Conservative | Sanjay Sasidharan | 455 | | |
| Christian | John Williams | 309 | 6.1 | |
| Conservative | Matthew Woods | 202 | | |
| Christian | Rosemary O'Garrow Noel | 169 | | |
| Christian | William Thompson | 160 | | |
| Turnout | | 4,324 | 54 | |
| Labour hold | | Swing | | |
| Labour hold | | Swing | | |
| Labour hold | | Swing | | |

=== 2006 election ===
The election took place on 4 May 2006.

2006 Hackney London Borough Council election: Wick
| Party | Candidate | Votes | % | ±% |
|---|---|---|---|---|
| Labour | Christine Boyd | 1,166 | 48.7 | |
| Labour | Christopher Kennedy | 1,108 | | |
| Labour | Jessica Webb | 1,068 | | |
| Liberal Democrats | Peter Fuller | 401 | 16.8 | |
| Green | Francois Gemenne | 375 | 15.7 | |
| Liberal Democrats | Wanda Jarnecki | 364 | | |
| Liberal Democrats | Brian Stone | 296 | | |
| Conservative | David Dodkin | 283 | 11.8 | |
| Conservative | Rupert Selby | 278 | | |
| Conservative | Stephen Selby | 203 | | |
| Independent | Adrian Peacock | 167 | 7.0 | |
| Turnout | | | 30.2 | |
| Labour hold | | Swing | | |
| Labour hold | | Swing | | |
| Labour hold | | Swing | | |

=== 2002 election ===
The election took place on 2 May 2002.

2002 Hackney London Borough Council election: Wick
| Party | Candidate | Votes | % | ±% |
|---|---|---|---|---|
| Labour | Jessica Webb | 827 | | |
| Labour | Christine Boyd | 826 | | |
| Labour | Christopher Kennedy | 786 | | |
| Liberal Democrats | Andrew Bridgwater | 542 | | |
| Liberal Democrats | Celya Maxted | 496 | | |
| Liberal Democrats | Adrian Gee-Turne | 464 | | |
| Green | Mark Chilver | 211 | | |
| Conservative | Stephen Selby | 205 | | |
| Conservative | Lorraine Fahey | 197 | | |
| Conservative | Sharon Kilduff | 191 | | |
| Socialist Alliance | Diana Swingler | 140 | | |
| CPA | Linda Monerville | 67 | | |
| Turnout | | | | |
| Labour win (new boundaries) | | | | |
| Labour win (new boundaries) | | | | |
| Labour win (new boundaries) | | | | |

== 1994–2002 Hackney council elections ==
On 1 April 1994 there was an exchange of unpopulated territory with Park ward in Tower Hamlets. Also on 1 April 1994 the Hackney/Newham boundary was realigned to the centre of the River Lea with a small population transferred to the New Town ward.

=== 2000 by-election ===
The by-election took place on 12 October 2000, following the resignation of Neil Hughes.

2000 Wick by-election
| Party | Candidate | Votes | % | ±% |
|---|---|---|---|---|
| Labour | Jessica Webb | 496 | | |
| Liberal Democrats | Kenrick Hanson | 423 | | |
| Socialist Alliance | Diana Swingler | 134 | | |
| Conservative | Alexander Ellis | 99 | | |
| Independent | Adrian Peacock | 25 | | |
| Majority | | 73 | | |
| Turnout | | | 18.4 | |
| Labour gain from Liberal Democrats | | Swing | | |

=== 1998 election ===
The election on 7 May 1998 took place on the same day as the 1998 Greater London Authority referendum.

1998 Hackney London Borough Council election: Wick
| Party | Candidate | Votes | % | ±% |
|---|---|---|---|---|
| Liberal Democrats | Neil Hughes | 1,233 | 63.48 | ▲15.72 |
| Liberal Democrats | Andrew Bridgwater | 1,154 | | |
| Liberal Democrats | Adrian Gee-Turner | 1,108 | | |
| Labour | Elizabeth Clowes | 608 | 31.06 | ▼7.07 |
| Labour | Allan Hilton | 589 | | |
| Labour | William O'Connor | 513 | | |
| Conservative | Ann Brenells | 117 | 5.47 | ▼2.67 |
| Conservative | Yann Leclercq | 100 | | |
| Conservative | Irene Wonderling | 84 | | |
| Registered electors | | 6,063 | | ▼940 |
| Turnout | | 2,019 | 33.30 | ▼7.64 |
| Rejected ballots | | 15 | 0.74 | ▲0.39 |
| Liberal Democrats hold | | Swing | | |
| Liberal Democrats hold | | Swing | | |
| Liberal Democrats hold | | Swing | | |

=== 1996 by-election ===
The by-election took place on 27 June 1996, following the resignation of Peter Hoye.

1996 Wick by-election
| Party | Candidate | Votes | % | ±% |
|---|---|---|---|---|
| Liberal Democrats | Neil Hughes | 870 | | |
| Labour | Samantha Lloyd | 796 | | |
| Conservative | Michael Moriarty | 295 | | |
| BNP | William Binding | 56 | | |
| Majority | | 74 | | |
| Turnout | | | 33.1 | |
| Liberal Democrats hold | | Swing | | |

=== 1994 election ===
The election took place on 5 May 1994.

1994 Hackney London Borough Council election: Wick
| Party | Candidate | Votes | % | ±% |
|---|---|---|---|---|
| Liberal Democrats | Peter Hoye | 1,411 | 47.76 | ▼26.38 |
| Liberal Democrats | Adrian Frost | 1,332 | | |
| Liberal Democrats | Keith Steventon | 1,218 | | |
| Labour | Mary Browning | 1,143 | 38.13 | ▼3.00 |
| Labour | Samantha Lloyd | 1,077 | | |
| Labour | John Small | 943 | | |
| Conservative | Elizabeth Mellen | 230 | 8.14 | ▼7.23 |
| Conservative | Roger Durowse | 224 | | |
| Conservative | Christopher O'Leary | 221 | | |
| Green | Brenda Puech | 165 | 5.97 | ▼12.58 |
| Registered electors | | 7,003 | | ▼1,000 |
| Turnout | | 2,867 | 40.94 | ▲7.23 |
| Rejected ballots | | 10 | 0.35 | ▲0.02 |
| Liberal Democrats gain from Labour | | | | |
| Liberal Democrats gain from Labour | | | | |
| Liberal Democrats hold | | | | |

== 1978–1994 Hackney council elections ==
Wick ward boundaries from 1978 to 1994

There was a revision of ward boundaries in Hackney in 1978.

=== 1992 by-election ===
The by-election took place on 19 November 1992, following the resignation of Georgina Nicholas.

1992 Wick by-election
| Party | Candidate | Votes | % | ±% |
|---|---|---|---|---|
| Liberal Democrats | Peter Hoye | 798 | 41.6 | |
| Labour | Samantha Lloyd | 623 | 32.5 | |
| Conservative | Maureen Middleton | 464 | 24.2 | |
| Green | Paul Thomas | 34 | 1.8 | |
| Turnout | | | 31.0 | |
| Liberal Democrats gain from Labour | | Swing | | |

=== 1990 election ===
The election took place on 3 May 1990.

1990 Hackney London Borough Council election: Wick
| Party | Candidate | Votes | % | ±% |
|---|---|---|---|---|
| Labour | Georgina Nicholas | 1,247 | 47.93 | |
| Labour | Harold Shaw | 1,190 | | |
| Labour Co-op | Gerald Ross | 1,116 | | |
| Conservative | Michelle Hart | 685 | 26.32 | |
| Conservative | Agnes Thompson | 652 | | |
| Green | Simon Jamieson | 636 | 25.75 | |
| Conservative | Janet Londt | 613 | | |
| Registered electors | | 6,785 | | |
| Turnout | | 2,341 | 34.50 | |
| Rejected ballots | | 10 | 0.43 | |
| Labour hold | | Swing | | |
| Labour hold | | Swing | | |
| Labour Co-op hold | | Swing | | |

=== 1986 election ===
The election took place on 8 May 1986.

1986 Hackney London Borough Council election: Wick
| Party | Candidate | Votes | % | ±% |
|---|---|---|---|---|
| Labour | Ann Mallaghan | 1,235 | | |
| Labour | Terence Macalister | 1,196 | | |
| Labour | Peter Watson | 1,125 | | |
| Alliance | Wendy Barrett | 829 | | |
| Alliance | Stuart Etherington | 806 | | |
| Alliance | Geoffrey Taylor | 802 | | |
| Conservative | Brian Pentecost | 362 | | |
| Conservative | Robert Barnes | 334 | | |
| Conservative | Cheuk Tang | 303 | | |
| Turnout | | | | |
| Labour hold | | Swing | | |
| Labour hold | | Swing | | |
| Labour hold | | Swing | | |

=== 1982 election ===
The election took place on 6 May 1982.

1982 Hackney London Borough Council election: Wick
| Party | Candidate | Votes | % | ±% |
|---|---|---|---|---|
| Labour | Isabella Callaghan | 1,376 | | |
| Labour | Ruth Gee | 1,201 | | |
| Labour | John Paton | 1,161 | | |
| Conservative | Moira Gardiner | 694 | | |
| Conservative | Geoffrey Lenox-Smith | 661 | | |
| Conservative | Charles Hegerty | 626 | | |
| Turnout | | | | |
| Labour hold | | Swing | | |
| Labour hold | | Swing | | |
| Labour hold | | Swing | | |

=== 1979 by-election ===
The by-election took place on 29 March 1979, following the death of John Hill.

1979 Wick by-election
| Party | Candidate | Votes | % | ±% |
|---|---|---|---|---|
| Labour | Isabella Callaghan | 991 | | |
| Conservative | Christopher Sills | 789 | | |
| National Front | Michael Sullivan | 212 | | |
| Liberal | Russell Conway | 60 | | |
| Residents | Georgina Fowkes | 31 | | |
| Communist | David Boyes | 28 | | |
| Majority | | 212 | | |
| Turnout | | 7,004 | 30.2 | |
| Labour hold | | Swing | | |

=== 1978 election ===
The election took place on 4 May 1978.

1978 Hackney London Borough Council election: Wick
| Party | Candidate | Votes | % | ±% |
|---|---|---|---|---|
| Labour | John Hill | 1,340 | | |
| Labour | Donald Ward | 1,250 | | |
| Labour | John Paton | 1,214 | | |
| Conservative | Patrick Martin-Smith | 676 | | |
| Conservative | George Jones | 666 | | |
| Conservative | Moira Gardiner | 662 | | |
| National Front | Thomas Spencer | 320 | | |
| National Front | Ronald Inkersole | 319 | | |
| National Front | Michael Sullivan | 319 | | |
| Turnout | | | | |
| Labour win (new boundaries) | | | | |
| Labour win (new boundaries) | | | | |
| Labour win (new boundaries) | | | | |

== 1964–1978 Hackney council elections ==
=== 1974 election ===
The election took place on 2 May 1974.

1974 Hackney London Borough Council election: Wick
| Party | Candidate | Votes | % | ±% |
|---|---|---|---|---|
| Labour | S. Hand | 1,254 | | |
| Labour | G. Martin | 1,249 | | |
| Labour | Donald Ward | 1,241 | | |
| Conservative | M. Sexton | 239 | | |
| Conservative | B. Bord | 213 | | |
| Conservative | G. Worthy | 206 | | |
| Turnout | | | | |
| Labour hold | | Swing | | |
| Labour hold | | Swing | | |
| Labour hold | | Swing | | |

=== 1971 election ===
The election took place on 13 May 1971.

1971 Hackney London Borough Council election: Wick
| Party | Candidate | Votes | % | ±% |
|---|---|---|---|---|
| Labour | S. Hand | 1,909 | | |
| Labour | A. Linzell | 1,892 | | |
| Labour | Donald Ward | 1,828 | | |
| Conservative | E. Glynn | 383 | | |
| Conservative | I. Oakeley | 383 | | |
| Conservative | J. Oakeley | 369 | | |
| Turnout | | | | |
| Labour gain from Conservative | | Swing | | |
| Labour gain from Conservative | | Swing | | |
| Labour hold | | Swing | | |

=== 1968 election ===
The election took place on 9 May 1968.

1968 Hackney London Borough Council election: Wick
| Party | Candidate | Votes | % | ±% |
|---|---|---|---|---|
| Conservative | J. Oakeley | 753 | | |
| Conservative | R. Randall | 726 | | |
| Labour | A. Harrison | 722 | | |
| Conservative | J. Deathridge | 718 | | |
| Labour | S. Hand | 717 | | |
| Labour | A. Linzell | 700 | | |
| Turnout | | | | |
| Conservative gain from Labour | | Swing | | |
| Conservative gain from Labour | | Swing | | |
| Labour hold | | Swing | | |

=== 1964 election ===
The election took place on 7 May 1964.

1964 Hackney London Borough Council election: Wick
| Party | Candidate | Votes | % | ±% |
|---|---|---|---|---|
| Labour | A. Heath | 900 | | |
| Labour | J. Heath | 874 | | |
| Labour | S. Hand | 869 | | |
| Conservative | J. Oakeley | 260 | | |
| Conservative | R. Randall | 258 | | |
| Conservative | J. Deathridge | 236 | | |
| Turnout | | 1,175 | 14.1 | |
| Labour win (new seat) | | | | |
| Labour win (new seat) | | | | |
| Labour win (new seat) | | | | |
