= Cazenove (ward) =

Electoral ward in the London Borough of Hackney

Coordinates: 51°33′58″N 0°04′01″W

- Electoral ward for the Hackney London Borough Council
- Cazenove ward boundaries since 2014
- Borough: Hackney
- County: Greater London
- Population: 15,332 (2021)
- Electorate: 9,354 (2022)
- Area: 0.7581 square kilometres (0.2927 sq mi)

Current electoral ward
- Created: 2002
- Number of members: 3
- Councillors: Charlie Lawrie; Ian Sharer; Emma Neath
- GSS code: E05000232 (2002–2014); E05009368 (2014–present)

Cazenove is an electoral ward in the London Borough of Hackney. The ward was first used in the 2002 elections. It returns three councillors to Hackney London Borough Council. Its name derives from the Cazenove Road which runs through the ward. The population of the ward was 15,332 at the 2021 Census.

== List of councillors ==
Term	Councillor	Party
2002–2018	Ian Sharer	Liberal Democrats
2024–present	Ian Sharer	Conservative
2002–2018	Dawood Akhoon	Liberal Democrats
2002–2010	Joseph Stauber	Liberal Democrats
2010–2018	Abraham Jacobson	Liberal Democrats
2018–2026	Sam Pallis	Labour
2018–2022	Anthony McMahon	Labour
2018–2024	Caroline Woodley	Labour
2022–2024	Eluzer Goldberg	Labour
2024–2026	Patrick Pinkerton	Labour
2026-present	Charlie Lawrie	Green
2026-present	Emma Neath	Green

== Hackney council elections since 2014 ==
There was a revision of ward boundaries in Hackney in 2014. The Cazenove ward expanded slightly to the northeast, taking in part of the Springfield ward.

=== July 2024 by-election ===
The by-election on 4 July 2024 took place on the same day as the United Kingdom general election. It followed the resignation of Eluzer Goldberg. Patrick Pinkerton was elected as the new representative for Cazenove. Vote share changes displayed are relative to the January 2024 by-election.

July 2024 Cazenove by-election
Party	Candidate	Votes	%	±%
Labour	Patrick Pinkerton	1,974	37.4	▲6.4
Conservative	Hershi Moskovits	1,838	34.8	▼19.0
Green	Tamara Micner	1,170	22.2	▲9.4
Liberal Democrats	Ken Gabbott-Rolph	150	2.8	▲0.4
Independent	Faisal Riyaj Ibji	147	2.8	new
Turnout		5,279	52.2	▲20.3
Labour hold		Swing	▲12.7	

=== January 2024 by-election ===
The by-election took place on 18 January 2024. It followed the election of Caroline Woodley as Mayor of Hackney at the 2023 Hackney mayoral by-election. Before the election, London Labour suspended its candidate, Laura Pascal, following complaints about transphobia. Pascal was reinstated four hours before the election following an apology. The election marked the first time the Conservatives ever won a Cazenove councillor.

January 2024 Cazenove by-election
Party	Candidate	Votes	%	±%
Conservative	Ian Sharer	1,623	53.7	▲11
Labour	Laura Pascal	935	30.9	▼19.1
Green	Tamara Micner	387	12.8	new
Liberal Democrats	Dave Ravel	73	2.4	new
Turnout		3,018	31.92	▼7.2
Conservative gain from Labour		Swing	▼9.55	

=== 2022 election ===
The election took place on 5 May 2022.

2022 Hackney London Borough Council election: Cazenove (3)
Party	Candidate	Votes	%	±%
Labour	Caroline Woodley	1,724	50.0	▲2.53
Labour	Eluzer Goldberg	1,709	49.6	▲2.53
Labour	Sam Pallis	1,582	45.9	▲2.53
Liberal Democrats	Ian Sharer	1,471	42.7	▼0.40
Liberal Democrats	Javed Isrolia	1,233	35.8	▼0.40
Liberal Democrats	Darren Martin	1,121	32.5	▼0.40
Green	Maria Garcia	463	13.4	▲3.73
Green	Daniel Alexander	433	12.6	▲3.73
Green	Stephen Fielder	277	8.0	▲3.73
Conservative	Rishiduth Bootna	251	7.3	▲3.67
TUSC	Naomi Byron	81	2.3	new
Turnout		3,779	52.17	▲20.25
Labour hold		Swing		

=== 2018 election ===
The election took place on 3 May 2018.

2018 Hackney London Borough Council election: Cazenove (3)
Party	Candidate	Votes	%	±%
Labour	Sam Pallis	2,148	47.8	
Labour	Anthony McMahon	2,078	46.2	
Labour	Caroline Woodley	1,973	43.9	
Liberal Democrats	Javed Isrolia	1,733	38.5	
Liberal Democrats	Ian Sharer	1,694	37.7	
Liberal Democrats	Issac Kornbluh	1,620	36.0	
Green	Carrie Davies	441	9.8	
Green	Georgina Machray	356	7.9	
Green	David Mercer	228	5.1	
Conservative	Amy Gray	204	4.5	
Conservative	Duncan Gray	164	3.6	
Conservative	Joanna Wojciechowska	125	2.8	
Independent	Bruce Spenser	80	1.8	
Majority				
Turnout			48.1	
Labour gain from Liberal Democrats		Swing		
Labour gain from Liberal Democrats		Swing		
Labour gain from Liberal Democrats		Swing		

=== 2014 election ===
The election took place on 22 May 2014.

2014 Hackney London Borough Council election: Cazenove (3)
Party	Candidate	Votes	%	±%
Liberal Democrats	Abraham Jacobson	1,731	41.8%	
Liberal Democrats	Dawood Ebrahim Akhoon	1,715	41.3%	
Liberal Democrats	Ian David Sharer	1,709	41.2%	
Labour	Kofo Adeolu-David	1,688	40.7%	
Labour	Gilbert Smyth	1,602	38.6%	
Labour	Matthew Burn	1,593	38.4%	
Green	Mischa Borris	744	17.9%	
Green	Jenny Lopez	580	14.0%	
Green	Teresa Webb	538	13.0%	
Conservative	Marzena Iwona Kwasnik	209	5.0%	
Conservative	Pamela Yvonne Sills	189	4.6%	
Conservative	Erika Halasz	150	3.6%	
Majority				
Turnout				
Liberal Democrats win (new boundaries)				
Liberal Democrats win (new boundaries)				
Liberal Democrats win (new boundaries)				

== 2002–2014 Hackney council elections ==
Cazenove ward boundaries from 2002 to 2014

The ward was created for the May 2002 election.

=== 2010 election ===
The election on 6 May 2010 took place on the same day as the United Kingdom general election.

2010 Hackney London Borough Council election: Cazenove (3)
Party	Candidate	Votes	%	±%
Liberal Democrats	Dawood Ebrahim Akhoon	2,212		
Liberal Democrats	Ian David Sharer	1,966		
Liberal Democrats	Abraham Jacobson	1,900		
Labour	Daniel Carey-Dawes	1,860		
Labour	Kofoworola David	1,722		
Labour	Joko Macfoy	1,514		
Green	Danny Bates	996		
Conservative	Nailah Daley	414		
Conservative	Christopher Sills	334		
Conservative	Alina Nowobilska	281		
Majority				
Turnout				
Liberal Democrats hold		Swing		
Liberal Democrats hold		Swing		
Liberal Democrats hold		Swing		

=== 2006 election ===
The election took place on 4 May 2006.

2006 Hackney London Borough Council election: Cazenove (3)
Party	Candidate	Votes	%	±%
Liberal Democrats	Dawood Akhoon	1,198	38.8	
Liberal Democrats	Ian Sharer	1,113		
Liberal Democrats	Joseph Stauber	948		
Labour	Mohamed Zina	909	29.5	
Labour	Oliver De Botton	808		
Labour	Benjamin Plant	787		
Green	Mima Bone	477	15.5	
Green	Leo Beattie	367		
Green	Yen Chong	352		
Respect	Gillian George	330	10.7	
Respect	Kenneth Muller	238		
Conservative	Christopher Ballingall	172	5.6	
Conservative	Leonard Rees	154		
Conservative	Sheena Ballingall	150		
Turnout			39.9	
Liberal Democrats hold		Swing		
Liberal Democrats hold		Swing		
Liberal Democrats hold		Swing		

=== 2002 election ===
The election took place on 2 May 2002.

2002 Hackney London Borough Council election: Cazenove (3)
Party	Candidate	Votes	%	±%
Liberal Democrats	Ian Sharer	1,197		
Liberal Democrats	Dawood Akhoon	1,169		
Liberal Democrats	Joseph Stauber	1,076		
Labour	Rosa Gomez	742		
Labour	William Quinn	706		
Labour	Morel Bernard	682		
Green	Scott Ferguson	399		
Conservative	Olive Rice	185		
Conservative	Anthony Bezzina	158		
Socialist Alternative	Christian Newby	155		
Conservative	Yann Leclercq	126		
CPA	Peter Brown	84		
Turnout				
Liberal Democrats win (new seat)				
Liberal Democrats win (new seat)				
Liberal Democrats win (new seat)				
