= Mayor of Hackney =

Elected mayor of London Borough of Hackney

- Coat of arms of Hackney London Borough Council

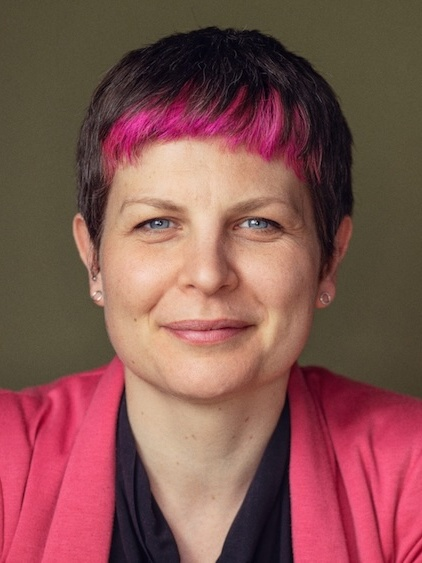
- Incumbent; Zoë Garbett since 11 May 2026
- Style: No courtesy title or style
- Appointer: Electorate of Hackney
- Term length: Four years
- Inaugural holder: Jules Pipe
- Formation: 17 October 2002
- Deputy: Dylan Law
- Salary: £89,224
- Website: hackney.gov.uk/mayor

The mayor of Hackney is a directly elected local authority mayor responsible for the executive function of Hackney London Borough Council in London, England. The post was created following a referendum in the London Borough of Hackney on 2 May 2002. The inaugural mayor Jules Pipe was succeeded by Philip Glanville following an election on 15 September 2016. Glanville resigned with effect from 22 September 2023, following a scandal. Fellow Labour Party councillor Caroline Woodley was elected as Mayor in November 2023. In 2026, Green Party politician Zoë Garbett was elected as mayor, becoming the party's first directly elected mayor.

== History ==
The directly elected mayoralty was created following a referendum on 2 May 2002 in the London Borough of Hackney. 70.1% of voters supported changing the executive arrangements of Hackney London Borough Council to a directly elected mayor.

The inaugural mayor was Jules Pipe of the Labour Party who was elected on 17 October 2002. He was re-elected in 2006, 2010 and 2014.

Pipe was succeeded by Philip Glanville, who was elected mayor at a by-election on 15 September 2016. Glanville was re-elected in 2018 and 2022.

On 15 September 2023, Glanville resigned, with effect from 22 September, following a scandal when he was photographed together with his housemate and Labour Party councillor Tom Dewey the night after he was arrested for child pornography charges. Tom Dewey was convicted before Glanville resigned. A by-election was held on 9 November to fill the remainder of the term, and was won by Caroline Woodley, a Labour councillor for Cazenove ward.

== Referendum results ==
Mayor of Hackney referendum 2 May 2002
Choice	Votes	%
Elected Mayor	24,697	70.09
Cabinet System	10,537	29.91
Required majority		50
Total	35,234	100.00
Valid votes	35,234	84.08
Invalid/blank votes	6,670	15.92
Total votes	41,904	100.00
Registered voters/turnout	131,569	31.85
Source: Hackney Council

== Election results ==
=== 2026 ===
2026 Hackney mayoral election
Party	Candidate	Votes	%	±%
Green	Zoë Garbett	35,720	47.2	+22.7
Labour	Caroline Woodley	26,865	35.5	−13.3
Conservative	Tareke Gregg	6,345	8.4	−5.2
Reform	Vahid Almasi	4,013	5.3	New
Liberal Democrats	Eva Steinhardt	2,731	3.6	−1.5
Turnout		75,674	40.7	+6.6
Green gain from Labour				

=== 2023 ===
2023 Hackney mayoral by-election
Party	Candidate	Votes	%	±%
Labour	Caroline Woodley	18,474	49.8	−9.3
Green	Zoë Garbett	9,075	24.5	+7.5
Conservative	Simche Steinberger	5,039	13.6	+0.2
Liberal Democrats	Simon de Deney	1,879	5.1	−2.0
Independent	Peter Smorthit	1,382	3.7	New
TUSC	Annoesjka Valent	1,265	3.4	New
Labour hold				

This was the first election run under first past the post rather than the prior use of supplementary vote.

=== 2022 ===
2022 Hackney mayoral election
Party	Candidate	1st round		2nd round			1st round votesTransfer votes, 2nd round
Party	Candidate	Total	Of round	Transfers	Total	Of round	1st round votesTransfer votes, 2nd round
Labour Co-op	Philip Glanville	36,049	59.1%				
Green	Zoë Garbett	10,373	17.0%				
Conservative	Oliver Hall	8,160	13.4%				
Liberal Democrats	Helen Baxter	4,320	7.1%				
People Before Profit	Gwenton Sloley	2,105	3.5%				
Turnout		61,007	34.1%				
Labour Co-op hold							

=== 2018 ===
2018 Hackney mayoral election
Party	Candidate	1st round		2nd round			1st round votesTransfer votes, 2nd round
Party	Candidate	Total	Of round	Transfers	Total	Of round	1st round votesTransfer votes, 2nd round
Labour Co-op	Philip Glanville	42,645	65.9%				
Conservative	Imtiyaz Lunat	7,183	11.1%				
Green	Alastair Binnie-Lubbock	6,774	10.5%				
Liberal Democrats	Pauline Pearce	4,846	7.5%				
Women's Equality	Harini Iyengar	2,659	4.1%				
Independent	Vernon Williams	577	0.9%				
Turnout		64,684	36.9%				
Labour Co-op hold							

=== 2016 ===
2016 Hackney mayoral by-election
Party	Candidate	1st round		2nd round			1st round votesTransfer votes, 2nd round
Party	Candidate	Total	Of round	Transfers	Total	Of round	1st round votesTransfer votes, 2nd round
Labour	Philip Glanville	22,595	68.9%				
Green	Samir Jeraj	4,338	13.2%				
Conservative	Amy Gray	3,533	10.8%				
Liberal Democrats	Dave Raval	1,818	5.5%				
One Love	Dawa Ma	494	1.5%				
Turnout		32,778	18.6%				
Labour hold							

=== 2014 ===
2014 Hackney mayoral election
Party	Candidate	1st round		2nd round			1st round votesTransfer votes, 2nd round
Party	Candidate	Total	Of round	Transfers	Total	Of round	1st round votesTransfer votes, 2nd round
Labour	Jules Pipe	40,858	60.38%				
Green	Mischa Borris	11,849	17.51%				
Conservative	Linda Kelly	7,853	11.61%				
Liberal Democrats	Simon De Deney	3,840	5.68%				
Putting Hackney First	Mustafa Korel	3,265	4.83%				
Total votes		67,665	39.61%				
Labour hold							

=== 2010 ===
2010 Hackney mayoral election
Party	Candidate	1st round		2nd round			1st round votesTransfer votes, 2nd round
Party	Candidate	Total	Of round	Transfers	Total	Of round	1st round votesTransfer votes, 2nd round
Labour	Jules Pipe	48,363	53.85%				
Liberal Democrats	Adrian Gee-Turner	15,818	17.61%				
Conservative	Andrew Boff	12,405	13.81%				
Green	Mischa Borris	10,100	11.25%				
Communist	Monty Goldman	2,033	2.26%				
Christian	William Thompson	1,084	1.21%				
Total votes		89,803	58%				
Labour hold							

=== 2006 ===
2006 Hackney mayoral election
Party	Candidate	1st round		2nd round			1st round votesTransfer votes, 2nd round
Party	Candidate	Total	Of round	Transfers	Total	Of round	1st round votesTransfer votes, 2nd round
Labour	Jules Pipe	20,830	46.86%	3,404	24,234	73.39%	
Conservative	Andrew Boff	7,454	16.77%	1,331	8,785	26.61%	
Liberal Democrats	Matthew Penhaligon	4,882	10.98%				
Green	Mima Bone	4,683	10.53%				
Independent	Hettie Peters	2,907	6.54%				
Respect	Dean Ryan	2,800	6.30%				
Communist	Monty Goldman	896	2.02%				
Turnout		44,452	34.3%				
Labour hold							

=== 2002 ===
2002 Hackney mayoral election
Party	Candidate	1st round		2nd round			1st round votesTransfer votes, 2nd round
Party	Candidate	Total	Of round	Transfers	Total	Of round	1st round votesTransfer votes, 2nd round
Labour	Jules Pipe	13,813	41.95%	2,421	16,234	74.25%	
Conservative	Andrew Boff	4,502	13.67%	1,127	5,629	25.75%	
Socialist Alliance	Paul Foot	4,187	12.72%				
Liberal Democrats	Ian Sharer	4,185	12.71%				
Green	Crispin Truman	3,002	9.12%				
Hackney First	Bruce Spenser	1,543	4.69%				
Independent	Terry Edwards	1,253	3.81%				
Independent	Errol Carr	441	1.34%				
Turnout		34,415	26.34%				
Registered electors		130,657					
Labour win							

== List of elected mayors ==
The mayors since the office was created in 2002 have been:

Political party	Name	Entered office	Left office
Labour	Jules Pipe	21 October 2002	20 July 2016
Labour Co-op	Philip Glanville	19 September 2016	22 September 2023
Labour	Caroline Woodley	9 November 2023	11 May 2026
Green	Zoë Garbett	12 May 2026	incumbent
