= Zoë Garbett =

British politician

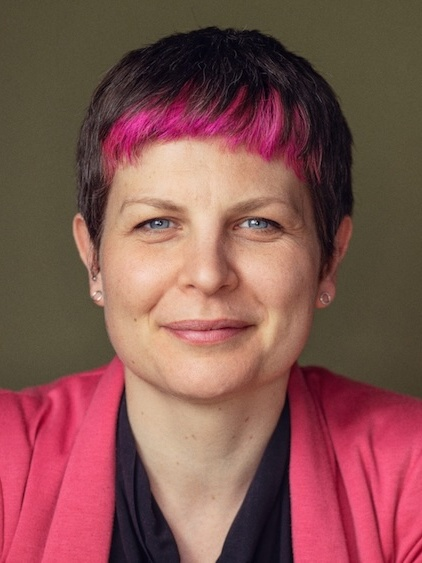
- Official portrait, 2026

Mayor of Hackney
- Incumbent
- Assumed office 11 May 2026
- Preceded by: Caroline Woodley

Member of the London Assembly as an additional member
- In office 7 May 2024 – 11 May 2026
- Preceded by: Siân Berry
- Succeeded by: Benali Hamdache

Hackney Borough Councillor for Dalston ward
- In office 5 May 2022 – May 2026

Personal details
- Born: Somerset, England
- Party: Green Party of England and Wales

Zoë Garbett is a British politician who has served as the Mayor of Hackney for the Green Party since 2026. She was previously a member of the London Assembly from 2024 to 2026, and a Hackney Councillor for Dalston from 2022 to 2026.

She was the Green candidate for mayor of London in the 2024 mayoral election, finishing fourth. She was fourth on the Green Party's list for the London Assembly and was not elected; however, Siân Berry resigned to stand for parliament in Brighton Pavilion, allowing Garbett to take her place.

Garbett served as Leader of the Green Party on Hackney London Borough Council, and a councillor for Dalston ward. She ran for Mayor of Hackney in the 2022 election and 2023 by-election, finishing second in both.

Garbett was elected as Mayor of Hackney in the 2026 Hackney mayoral election, making her one of the two first directly elected Green Party mayors in the party's history. She resigned her seats in the London Assembly and Hackney council as a result.

== Early life ==
Garbett grew up in Taunton, Somerset. She attended Richard Huish College.

== Political career ==
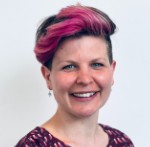
Garbett's official portrait on Hackney London Borough Council, c. 2024

In the 2022 UK local elections, Zoë Garbett contested both a seat in Hackney London Borough Council and for the directly-elected Mayor of Hackney.

In the 2022 Hackney London Borough Council election, Garbett was first elected as a councillor for Dalston ward, receiving 1,446 votes or 62.8% of the vote. She was the first green councillor to be elected to the position.

In the 2022 Hackney mayoral election, she came in second place with 17% of the vote, behind the Labour Party candidate, Philip Glanville.

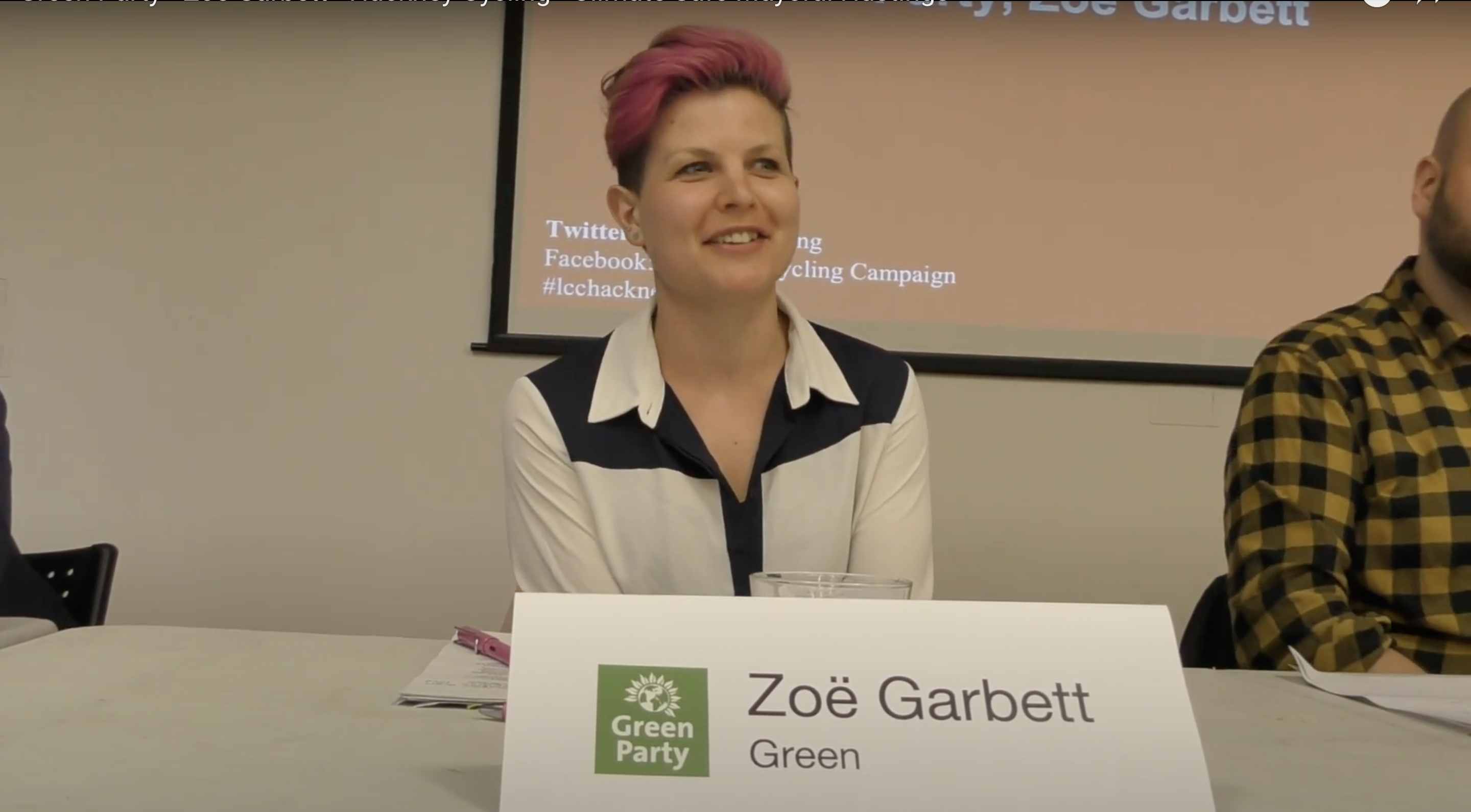
Garbett during ‘‘Hackney Cycling Campaign’’ event in 2022.

Following Hackney mayor Philip Glanville's suspension from the Labour Party over a photograph showing him with a councillor subsequently convicted on paedophilia charges, Garbett put forward a motion of no-confidence against Glanville, but it did not reach a debate of the full council. Mayor Glanville resigned two weeks later, vacating the position on 22 September 2023 and triggering a mayoral by-election.

Shortly after she was announced as the Green Party candidate in the 2023 Hackney mayoral election. Garbett came second place with 24.5% of the vote, behind the Labour Party candidate.

On 10 February 2023, she was announced as the Green Party candidate for the 2024 London mayoral election. Garbett launched her London mayoral campaign manifesto on 8 April 2024, committing to abolishing fare zones to implementing a flat-fee for travel on the London Underground, Overground and Docklands Light Railway. Garbett also campaigned on implementing rent controls, and establish a commission for reducing rents. Garbett came fourth, with 145,114 votes, narrowly behind the Liberal Democrat candidate with 145,184 votes.

She was fourth on the Green Party's list for the simultaneous 2024 London Assembly election, in which the Green Party won three London-wide seats, and was not elected. However, Assembly Member Siân Berry resigned three days after the election to focus more time on running for parliament in Brighton Pavilion, which allowed Garbett to take her place.

In September 2024, Zoë Garbett was involved in the founding of the left-wing organisation Greens Organise.

=== Mayor of Hackney ===
Zoë Garbett was elected mayor of Hackney in the May 2026 mayoral election, winning 47.2% of the vote. She is amongst the first ever directly-elected mayors from the Green Party, alongside Liam Shrivastava.

The Green Party also gained control of Hackney council from Labour in the simultaneous Hackney borough council election, in which Garbett was re-elected as a councillor for Dalston ward. However, Garbett vacated her seat in order to take up the mayoralty.

Garbett also resigned her seat in the London Assembly, and was replaced by Benali Hamdache, who was fifth on the Green Party list in the 2024 election.

On 30 July 2026, Garbett requested that the Israeli city of Haifa respond to a request to detwin with her constiuency of Hackney. Garbett explained that "given the ongoing humanitarian crisis, and ... genocide, maintaining a civic connection with what is widely recognised is a military port city is fundamentally at odds with our anti-racist values". However, Garbett gave the deadline of October 7, the third anniversary of the October 7 attacks, which drew criticism. Garbett apologised and the deadline was quickly changed to the 14th of October.

== Personal life ==
Garbett is queer.

Political offices
Preceded by Caroline Woodley	Mayor of Hackney; 2026–present	Incumbent
Preceded by Soraya Adejare Adesanu	Hackney Borough Councillor for Dalston; 2022–2026	Succeeded by Manal Massalha
