= Caroline Woodley =

British politician

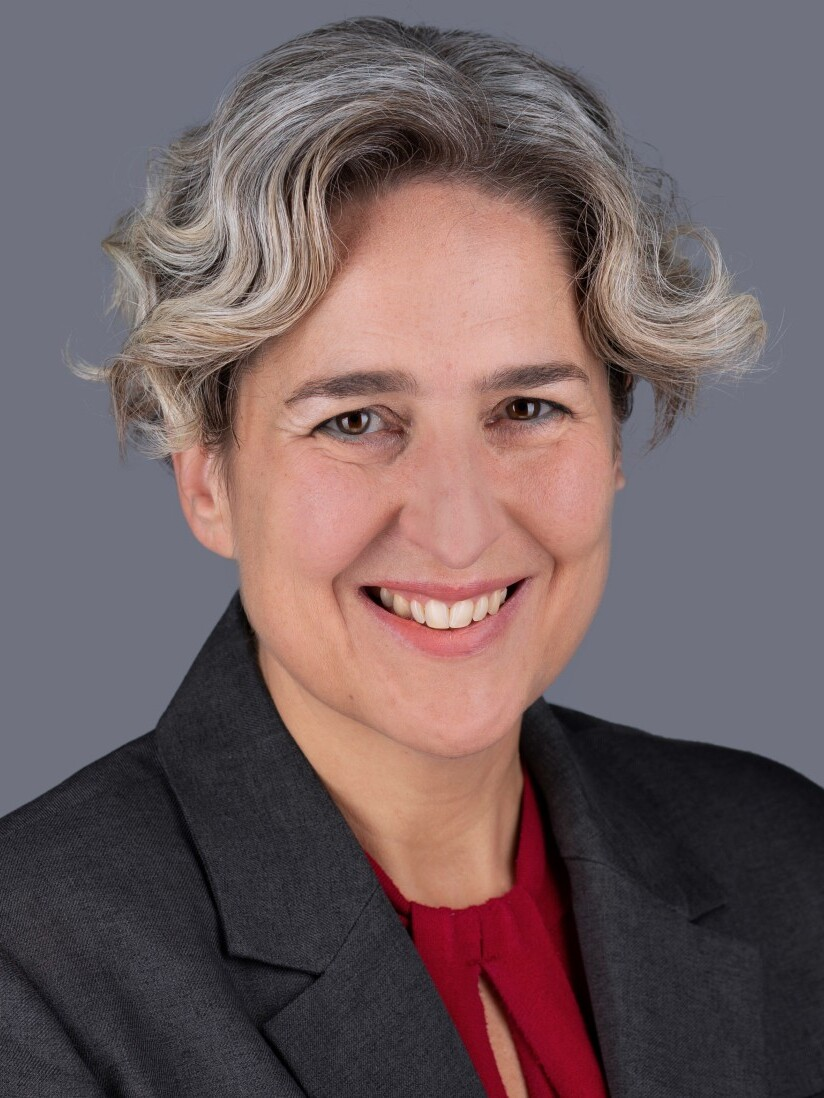
- Official portrait, 2024

Mayor of Hackney
- In office 9 November 2023 – 11 May 2026
- Preceded by: Philip Glanville
- Succeeded by: Zoë Garbett

Hackney Borough Councillor for Cazenove
- In office 8 May 2018 – 9 November 2023
- Preceded by: Ian Sharer
- Succeeded by: Ian Sharer

Personal details
- Born: Caroline Rebecca Woodley
- Party: Labour
- Children: 1

Caroline Rebecca Woodley is a British Labour Party politician who served as Mayor of Hackney from 2023 until 2026.

== Political career ==
Woodley joined the Labour Party in 2015, following the Conservative Party's win in that year's general election. She was elected to Hackney London Borough Council in 2018 for the Cazenove ward, gaining her seat from the Liberal Democrats, and was re-elected in 2022. She became the cabinet member for families, parks and leisure.

=== Mayor of Hackney ===
Woodley was elected Mayor of Hackney in a by-election held on 9 November 2023, becoming the borough's third directly elected mayor following the resignation of her predecessor, Philip Glanville. She was the first woman to be elected Mayor of Hackney. Woodley ran for re-election in 2026 and came second to Zoë Garbett.

During Woodley's mayoralty, Hackney Labour's handling of the Laura Pascal affair drew criticism from rival parties. Pascal, selected as Labour's candidate for the Cazenove by-election triggered by Woodley's elevation to mayor, was suspended days before the January 2024 vote following allegations of transphobia, before being reinstated on the eve of polling day. The Hackney Green Party stated that calls to address concerns about Pascal's selection had been "met with silence", while both Hackney Labour and London Labour failed to respond to press questions about whether they had been aware of her views prior to her selection. Labour lost the subsequent by-election to the Conservatives, with its vote total falling 46% compared to Woodley's 2022 result, and in 2026 the Green Party won two of the three Cazenove council seats, with Labour winning none.

== Personal life ==
Woodley has a son, whom she raised as a single parent.

Political offices
Preceded by Philip Glanville	Mayor of Hackney; 2023–present	Incumbent
Preceded by Ian Sharer	Hackney Borough Councillor for Cazenove; 2018–2023	Succeeded by Ian Sharer
