= 2006 Hackney London Borough Council election =

2006 local election in England

2006 Hackney Council election
- 4 May 2006

All 57 seats to Hackney London Borough Council 29 seats needed for a majority
	First party	Second party	Third party
Party	Labour	Conservative	Liberal Democrats
Seats won	44	9	3
Seat change	▼1	Steady	Steady
Popular vote	20,304	8,563	8,181
Percentage	40.5%	17.1%	16.3%
Swing	▼1.1%	▲1.0%	▲5.0%
	Fourth party
Party	Green
Seats won	1
Seat change	▲1
Popular vote	10,340
Percentage	20.6%
Swing	▲5.7%
- Map of the results of the 2006 Hackney council election. Conservatives in blue, Greens in green, Labour in red and Liberal Democrats in yellow.
Council control before election
Labour
Council control after election
Labour

Elections for London Borough of Hackney Council were held on Thursday 4 May 2006. The whole council was up for election. Hackney is divided into 19 wards, each electing three councillors, so a total of 57 seats were up for election.

== Election results ==
Hackney local election result 2006
Party	Seats	Gains	Losses	Net gain/loss	Seats %	Votes %	Votes	+/−
Labour	44	0	1	▼1	77.2	40.5	20,304	▼1.1
Conservative	9	0	0	Steady	15.8	17.1	8,563	▲1.0
Liberal Democrats	3	0	0	Steady	5.3	16.3	8,181	▲5.0
Green	1	1	0	▲1	1.8	20.6	10,340	▲5.7
Respect	0	0	0	Steady	0.0	2.6	1,291	New
Hackney Independent	0	0	0	Steady	0.0	1.2	616	▼0.1
Socialist Unity	0	0	0	Steady	0.0	0.5	260	New
Communist	0	0	0	Steady	0.0	0.4	190	▲0.1
Christian	0	0	0	Steady	0.0	0.4	184	New
Independent	0	0	0	Steady	0.0	0.3	167	▼1.7
Liberal	0	0	0	Steady	0.0	0.1	51	▼0.5

== Election for Mayor ==
In a system with second preference being also decided by the Electorate, the Mayor was comfortably re-elected with a majority of over 15,000.

Results for each candidate

Hackney Mayoral Election Results 2006
Name	Party	1st Preference Votes	%	2nd Preference Votes¹	%	Final	%²
Jules Pipe	Labour	20,830	46.9	3,403	?	24,233	73.4
Andrew Boff	Conservative	7,454	16.8	1,331	?	8,785	26.6
Matthew Penhaligon	Lib Dem	4,882	11.0	?	?	N/A	
Mima Bone	Green	4,683	10.5	?	?	N/A	
Hettie Peters	Independent	2,907	6.5	?	?	N/A	
Dean Ryan	RESPECT	2,800	6.3	?	?	N/A	
Monty Goldman	Communist	896	2.0	?	?	N/A	

¹Under the Supplementary Vote system, if no candidate receives 50% of 1st choice votes, 2nd choice votes are added to the result for the top two 1st choice candidates. If a ballot gives a first and second preference to the top two candidates in either order, then their second preference is not counted, so that a second preference cannot count against a first.

²Percentage figures are not officially used on the final votes, they are produced here for illustration and are calculated by the candidates final vote divided by the total of final votes.

Turnout for the Election of Mayor: 34.3% (26.34% in the previous election in 2002)

Mayor Jules Pipe's response to re-election

== Ward results ==
=== Brownswood ===
Brownswood (3)
Party	Candidate	Votes	%	±%
Labour	Brian Bell	977	41.7	
Labour	Darren Parker	824		
Labour	Feryat Demirci	808		
Green	Gordon Edge	561	23.9	
Green	Peter Lang	560		
Liberal Democrats	Rosemary Warner	469	20.0	
Liberal Democrats	Sheonaidh Cumming	410		
Liberal Democrats	Mark Smulian	378		
Conservative	Glenda Aussenberg	336	14.3	
Conservative	Christopher Mahon	324		
Conservative	Michael Donoghue	313		
Turnout			31.5	
Labour hold		Swing		
Labour hold		Swing		
Labour hold		Swing		

=== Cazenove ===
Cazenove (3)
Party	Candidate	Votes	%	±%
Liberal Democrats	Dawood Akhoon	1,198	38.8	
Liberal Democrats	Ian Sharer	1,113		
Liberal Democrats	Joseph Stauber	948		
Labour	Mohamed Zina	909	29.5	
Labour	Oliver De Botton	808		
Labour	Benjamin Plant	787		
Green	Mima Bone	477	15.5	
Green	Leo Beattie	367		
Green	Yen Chong	352		
Respect	Gillian George	330	10.7	
Respect	Kenneth Muller	238		
Conservative	Christopher Ballingall	172	5.6	
Conservative	Leonard Rees	154		
Conservative	Sheena Ballingall	150		
Turnout			39.9	
Liberal Democrats hold		Swing		
Liberal Democrats hold		Swing		
Liberal Democrats hold		Swing		

=== Chatham ===
Chatham (3)
Party	Candidate	Votes	%	±%
Labour	William Nicholson	1,108	45.8	
Labour	Sally Mulready	1,108		
Labour	Luke Akehurst	1,005		
Green	Mark Douglas	512	21.1	
Liberal Democrats	Glyn Green	402	16.6	
Liberal Democrats	Michael McCairn	323		
Conservative	Yann Leclercq	215	8.9	
Conservative	Harold Symons	213		
Conservative	Bixby Palmer	187		
Christian	Olumide Awobowale	184	7.6	
Christian	Coral Thompson	125		
Christian	William Thompson	98		
Turnout			29.7	
Labour hold		Swing		
Labour hold		Swing		
Labour hold		Swing		

=== Clissold ===
Clissold (3)
Party	Candidate	Votes	%	±%
Green	Mischa Borris	1,240	38.2	
Labour	Karen Alcock	1,175	36.2	
Labour	Linda Smith	1,127		
Green	Keith Magnum	1,066		
Labour	Thomas Fajana	1,050		
Green	Charlotte Woodworth	847		
Liberal Democrats	Sylvia Anderson	365	11.2	
Respect	Asli Demirel	262	8.1	
Liberal Democrats	Habiba Bham	245		
Respect	Sasha Simic	216		
Liberal Democrats	Abraham Jacobson	212		
Conservative	Martin Bakewell	208	6.4	
Conservative	Vanessa Ford	185		
Conservative	Irene Lewington	135		
Turnout			40.8	
Green gain from Labour		Swing		
Labour hold		Swing		
Labour hold		Swing		

=== Dalston ===
Dalston (3)
Party	Candidate	Votes	%	±%
Labour	Sophie Linden	1,046	43.5	
Labour	Nargis Khan	1,012		
Labour	Angus Mulready-Jones	1,005		
Green	Ann Squire	614	25.5	
Green	John Dixon	600		
Liberal Democrats	Charlotte Thrane	419	17.4	
Liberal Democrats	Jesper Mortensen	379		
Conservative	Ibrahim Erdogmus	327	13.6	
Liberal Democrats	Maria Zahle	325		
Conservative	Ann McGinley	284		
Conservative	Winifred Saunders	282		
Turnout			32.8	
Labour hold		Swing		
Labour hold		Swing		
Labour hold		Swing		

=== De Beauvoir ===
De Beauvoir (3)
Party	Candidate	Votes	%	±%
Labour	Robert Chapman	1,151	46.2	
Labour	Gulay Icoz	1,107		
Labour	Christopher McShane	1,100		
Conservative	Jonathan Bannister	490	19.6	
Green	Paul Ingram	436	17.5	
Liberal Democrats	Peter Friend	417	16.7	
Conservative	Russell Le Page	368		
Liberal Democrats	Patricia Holloway	359		
Conservative	Dominic Simler	353		
Liberal Democrats	Keith Steventon	186		
Turnout			30.1	
Labour hold		Swing		
Labour hold		Swing		
Labour hold		Swing		

=== Hackney Central ===
Hackney Central (3)
Party	Candidate	Votes	%	±%
Labour	Samantha Lloyd	1,259	43.3	
Labour	Alan Laing	1,233		
Labour	Vincent Stops	1,061		
Green	Terence Gallagher	598	20.6	
Liberal Democrats	Irene Fawkes	543	18.7	
Liberal Democrats	Shaun Sanders	343		
Liberal Democrats	Reuven Thompson-Wood	320		
Socialist Unity	Janine Booth	260	8.9	
Conservative	Jeanette Frost	246	8.5	
Conservative	Robert Kelsey	229		
Conservative	William Ledger	205		
Socialist Unity	Charles McDonald	161		
Turnout			32.8	
Labour hold		Swing		
Labour hold		Swing		
Labour hold		Swing		

=== Hackney Downs ===
Hackney Downs (3)
Party	Candidate	Votes	%	±%
Labour	Michael Desmond	1,054	46.3	
Labour	Faizullah Khan	1,048		
Labour	Semakaleng Moema	830		
Green	Michael Jefford	668	29.3	
Green	Joy MacKeith	661		
Liberal Democrats	Chaim Hochhauser	321	14.1	
Liberal Democrats	Nota Kreiman	290		
Liberal Democrats	Jeffrey Shenker	279		
Conservative	Peter Fazzani	234	10.3	
Conservative	Yvonne Kleinberg	185		
Conservative	Vera Landau	178		
Turnout			30.4	
Labour hold		Swing		
Labour hold		Swing		
Labour hold		Swing		

=== Haggerston ===
Haggerston (3)
Party	Candidate	Votes	%	±%
Labour	Afolasade Bright	1,034	39.5	
Labour	Jonathan McShane	990		
Labour	Barry Buitekant	935		
Hackney Independent	Arthur Shuter	616	23.5	
Hackney Independent	Peter Sutton	578		
Hackney Independent	Carl Taylor	541		
Green	Rajeev Thacker	375	14.3	
Liberal Democrats	Kay Ewen-Smith	283	10.8	
Conservative	Zeynep Karayilan	257	9.8	
Liberal Democrats	Steven Laing	248		
Liberal Democrats	Geoffrey Payne	247		
Conservative	Lisa Thomas	209		
Conservative	Lillian Odze	203		
Liberal	Benjamin Rae	51	1.9	
Turnout			31.6	
Labour hold		Swing		
Labour hold		Swing		
Labour hold		Swing		

=== Hoxton ===
Hoxton (3)
Party	Candidate	Votes	%	±%
Labour	Clayeon McKenzie	1,007	38.7	
Labour	Philip Glanville	996		
Labour	Carole Williams	916		
Liberal Democrats	David Phillips	627	24.1	
Liberal Democrats	Carl Nichols	623		
Liberal Democrats	Mahmood Bham	584		
Conservative	Christopher Lennon	540	20.7	
Conservative	Dean Lukeman	470		
Green	Polly Lane	431	16.5	
Conservative	Alexander van Terheyden	429		
Turnout			33.3	
Labour hold		Swing		
Labour hold		Swing		
Labour hold		Swing		

=== King's Park ===
King's Park (3)
Party	Candidate	Votes	%	±%
Labour	Sharon Patrick	1,305	56.9	
Labour	Julius Nkafu	1,159		
Labour	Mohammad Siddiqui	1,134		
Green	Peter Bloor	397	17.3	
Liberal Democrats	Bella Sharer	324	14.1	
Liberal Democrats	Joseph Horowitz	270		
Conservative	Paul Gray	267	11.6	
Conservative	Melanie Lukeman	258		
Liberal Democrats	Eva Stauber	241		
Conservative	Douglas McNaught	199		
Turnout			32.3	
Labour hold		Swing		
Labour hold		Swing		
Labour hold		Swing		

=== Leabridge ===
Leabridge (3)
Party	Candidate	Votes	%	±%
Labour	Linda Kelly	1,060	38.4	
Labour	Ian Rathbone	939		
Labour	Deniz Oguzkanli	803		
Green	Earl Douglas	642	23.3	
Green	Daisy Johnson	539		
Green	Bhavesh Hindocha	516		
Conservative	Mohamed Husain	393	14.3	
Respect	Michael Simons	382	13.9	
Respect	Fero Firat	324		
Conservative	Guy Humphreys	311		
Conservative	Mark Timmis	210		
Liberal Democrats	Judith Palmer	203	7.4	
Liberal Democrats	Anna Tan	199		
Liberal Democrats	Gita Jacobson	181		
Communist	James Beavis	77	2.8	
Turnout			38.8	
Labour hold		Swing		
Labour hold		Swing		
Labour hold		Swing		

=== Lordship ===
Lordship (3)
Party	Candidate	Votes	%	±%
Conservative	Bernard Aussenberg	1,053	39.9	
Conservative	Simon Tesler	997		
Conservative	Matthew Coggins	978		
Labour	Michael Harding	710	26.9	
Labour	Allan Hilton	573		
Green	Christopher Adair	546	20.7	
Green	Danny Bates	533		
Green	Margherita Martini-Brown	529		
Labour	Suraju-Deen Tiyamiyu	418		
Liberal Democrats	Richard Morgan-Ash	328	12.4	
Liberal Democrats	Anthony O'Brien	239		
Liberal Democrats	Mary O'Brien	239		
Turnout			39.1	
Conservative hold		Swing		
Conservative hold		Swing		
Conservative hold		Swing		

=== New River ===
New River (3)
Party	Candidate	Votes	%	±%
Conservative	Maureen Middleton	1,135	46.0	
Conservative	Simche Steinberger	1,099		
Conservative	Harvey Odze	1,080		
Labour	Mary Mulready-Jones	813	32.9	
Labour	Vincent La Placa	726		
Labour	Kevin Thompson	676		
Liberal Democrats	Amber Cobb	272	11.0	
Liberal Democrats	Nicholas Blane	259		
Green	Cedric Knight	250	10.1	
Liberal Democrats	Raoul Fishman	222		
Turnout			38.8	
Conservative hold		Swing		
Conservative hold		Swing		
Conservative hold		Swing		

=== Queensbridge ===
Queensbridge (3)
Party	Candidate	Votes	%	±%
Labour	Thomas Price	1,360	38.4	
Labour	Emma Plouviez	1,246		
Labour	Patrick Vernon	1,119		
Conservative	Andrew Boff	913	25.8	
Conservative	Alexander Ellis	632		
Conservative	Marcel Matthew	585		
Green	Ralph Smyth	544	15.4	
Liberal Democrats	Rosemary More	408	11.5	
Liberal Democrats	Monica Mattocks	367		
Respect	Diana Swingler	317	8.9	
Respect	George Solomou	310		
Liberal Democrats	Anthony Terrill	256		
Turnout			41.0	
Labour hold		Swing		
Labour hold		Swing		
Labour hold		Swing		

=== Springfield ===
Springfield (3)
Party	Candidate	Votes	%	±%
Conservative	Jacob Landau	836	42.9	
Conservative	Eric Ollerenshaw	794		
Conservative	Shuja Shaikh	724		
Labour	Nora Mulready	538	27.6	
Labour	Hugh Gouldbourne	531		
Labour	Florence Osaigbovo	503		
Green	Herbert Leonelli	264	13.5	
Liberal Democrats	Felicity Coffer	198	10.2	
Liberal Democrats	Dennis Donovan	188		
Liberal Democrats	Christopher O'Brien	163		
Communist	Monty Goldman	113	5.8	
Turnout			31.0	
Conservative hold		Swing		
Conservative hold		Swing		
Conservative hold		Swing		

=== Stoke Newington Central ===
Stoke Newington Central (3)
Party	Candidate	Votes	%	±%
Labour	James Carswell	1,207	45.3	
Labour	Rita Krishna	1,183		
Labour	Muttalip Unluer	913		
Green	Lack Lopez	769	28.9	
Green	Robert Lindsay	708		
Green	Gordon Hodgson	676		
Liberal Democrats	Victoria Lubbock	448	16.8	
Liberal Democrats	Steven Allen	411		
Liberal Democrats	Timothy Nichols	371		
Conservative	Joyce Palmer	239	9.0	
Conservative	Lillian Fazzani	223		
Conservative	Comfort Tawiah	176		
Turnout			35.9	
Labour hold		Swing		
Labour hold		Swing		
Labour hold		Swing		

=== Victoria ===
Victoria (3)
Party	Candidate	Votes	%	±%
Labour	Catherine Hanson	1,425	46.9	
Labour	Daniel Kemp	1,396		
Labour	Geoffrey Taylor	1,290		
Green	Tumble Bone	641	21.1	
Liberal Democrats	Susan Horowitz	555	18.3	
Liberal Democrats	Stephen Jackson	475		
Conservative	Graeme Archer	419	13.8	
Liberal Democrats	Stuart Round	415		
Conservative	Keith Pannell	376		
Conservative	Steven Farquhar	311		
Turnout			34.0	
Labour hold		Swing		
Labour hold		Swing		
Labour hold		Swing		

=== Wick ===
Wick (3)
Party	Candidate	Votes	%	±%
Labour	Christine Boyd	1,166	48.7	
Labour	Christopher Kennedy	1,108		
Labour	Jessica Webb	1,068		
Liberal Democrats	Peter Fuller	401	16.8	
Green	Francois Gemenne	375	15.7	
Liberal Democrats	Wanda Jarnecki	364		
Liberal Democrats	Brian Stone	296		
Conservative	David Dodkin	283	11.8	
Conservative	Rupert Selby	278		
Conservative	Stephen Selby	203		
Independent	Adrian Peacock	167	7.0	
Turnout			30.2	
Labour hold		Swing		
Labour hold		Swing		
Labour hold		Swing		

== See also ==
- 2006 United Kingdom local elections
