= 2010 Hackney London Borough Council election =

2010 local election in England

2010 Hackney Borough Council election
- 6 May 2010

All 57 seats to Hackney London Borough Council 29 seats needed for a majority
	First party	Second party	Third party
Party	Labour	Conservative	Liberal Democrats
Last election	44 seats, 40.5%	9 seats, 17.1%	3 seats, 16.3%
Seats won	50	4	3
Seat change	▲6	▼5	Steady
Popular vote	45,445	13,950	22,311
Percentage	45.9%	14.1%	22.6%
Swing	▲5.4%	▼3.0%	▲6.3%
- Map of the results of the 2010 Hackney council election. Conservatives in blue, Labour in red and Liberal Democrats in yellow.
Council control before election
Labour
Council control after election
Labour

Elections for London Borough of Hackney Council were held on Thursday 6 May 2010. The whole council was up for election. Hackney is divided into 19 wards, each electing 3 councillors, so a total of 57 seats were up for election.

== Summary results ==
At the 2010 council election, Labour won five seats from the Conservatives. These included two in New River; two in Lordship and one in Springfield. A former Green Party seat (in Clissold) was also lost to Labour. The Conservatives remain the largest opposition party with four seats (down from nine in 2006).

The election attracted national attention when, along with some other constituencies in the country, up to 270 people failed to be issued with ballot papers by the deadline of 10pm. This meant that they could not vote, and residents were angry when turned away from polling stations. The Council apologised unreservedly, blaming the high turnout for the problem.

Hackney local election result 2010
Party	Seats	Gains	Losses	Net gain/loss	Seats %	Votes %	Votes	+/−
Labour	50	6	0	▲6	87.7	45.9	45,445	▲5.4
Conservative	4	0	5	▼5	7.0	14.1	13,950	▼3.0
Liberal Democrats	3	0	0	Steady	5.3	22.6	22,311	▲6.3
Green	0	0	1	▼1	0.0	16.0	15,847	▼4.6
Independent	0	0	0	Steady	0.0	0.7	728	▲0.4
Christian	0	0	0	Steady	0.0	0.3	309	▼0.1
Communist	0	0	0	Steady	0.0	0.2	205	▼0.2
Liberal	0	0	0	Steady	0.0	0.1	135	0.0

== Election for Mayor ==
The incumbent, Jules Pipe was elected for his third term as elected mayor of the London Borough of Hackney, at the first ballot, with a majority of 32,545.

Results for each candidate

Hackney Mayoral Election Results 2010
Name	Party	1st Preference Votes	%	2nd Preference Votes¹	%	Final	%²
Jules Pipe	Labour	48,363	51.6				
Adrian Turner	Lib Dem	15,818	16.9				
Andrew Boff	Conservative	12,405	13.2				
Mischa Borris	Green	10,100	10.8				
Monty Goldman	Communist	2,033	2.2				
William Thompson	Christian	1,084	1.2				

- Votes cast: 93,770
- Overall Turnout for the Election of Mayor: 58% (34.3% in 2006, 26.34% in 2002)
- Result: Labour Hold

Under the Supplementary Vote system, if no candidate receives 50% of 1st choice votes, 2nd choice votes are added to the result for the top two 1st choice candidates. If a ballot gives a first and second preference to the top two candidates in either order, then their second preference is not counted, so that a second preference cannot count against a first.

== Ward results ==
The ward results were as follows:

=== Brownswood ===
Brownswood (3)
Party	Candidate	Votes	%	±%
Labour	Brian Bell	1,617	46.6	
Labour	Oli de Botton	1,448		
Labour	Feryal Demirci	1,225		
Liberal Democrats	Sarah Marsh	903	26.0	
Liberal Democrats	David Phillips	825		
Liberal Democrats	Bella Sharer	654		
Green	Peter Lang	534	15.4	
Green	Rebecca Redwood	506		
Green	Stuart Coggins	505		
Conservative	Ian Kleinberg	415	12.0	
Conservative	Yvonne Kleinberg	396		
Conservative	Andrew White	329		
Turnout		4,637	59.6	
Labour hold		Swing		
Labour hold		Swing		
Labour hold		Swing		

=== Cazenove ===
Cazenove (3)
Party	Candidate	Votes	%	±%
Liberal Democrats	Dawood Akhoon	2,212	44.1	
Liberal Democrats	Ian Sharer	1,966	39.2	
Liberal Democrats	Abraham Jacobson	1,900	37.9	
Labour	Daniel Carey-Dawes	1,860	37.1	
Labour	Kofoworola David	1,722	34.4	
Labour	Joko Macfoy	1,514	30.2	
Green	Danny Bates	996	19.9	
Conservative	Nailah Daley	414	8.3	
Conservative	Christopher Sills	334	6.7	
Conservative	Alina Nowobilska	281	5.6	
Turnout		5,013	60.7	
Liberal Democrats hold		Swing		
Liberal Democrats hold		Swing		
Liberal Democrats hold		Swing		

=== Chatham ===
Chatham (3)
Party	Candidate	Votes	%	±%
Labour	Guy Nicholson	2,738	57.4	
Labour	Sally Mulready	2,605	54.6	
Labour	Luke Akehurst	2,591	54.3	
Liberal Democrats	Mahfuzur Rahman	901	18.9	
Green	Polly Lane	799	16.7	
Liberal Democrats	Tim Seydali	789	16.5	
Conservative	Ben Mascall	539	11.3	
Green	Cedric Knight	518	10.9	
Green	John Devaney	495	10.4	
Conservative	Carl McClean	437	9.2	
Conservative	Lornette Spencer	357	7.5	
Turnout		4,771	54.3	
Labour hold		Swing		
Labour hold		Swing		
Labour hold		Swing		

=== Clissold ===
Clissold (3)
Party	Candidate	Votes	%	±%
Labour	Karen Alcock	2,979	53.2	
Labour	Wendy Mitchell	2,266	40.5	
Labour	Linda Smith	2,083	37.2	
Green	Pippa Lane	1,469	26.2	
Green	Peter Jones	1,425	25.4	
Green	Matthew Sellwood	1,291	23.1	
Liberal Democrats	Sylvia Anderson	1,290	23.0	
Liberal Democrats	Jan Morgan	796	14.2	
Liberal Democrats	Keren Kohn-Souza	683	12.2	
Conservative	Samuel Ibbott	509	9.1	
Conservative	Irene Lewington	369	6.6	
Conservative	Ita Steinberger	283	5.1	
Turnout		5,600	65.4	
Labour gain from Green		Swing		
Labour hold		Swing		
Labour hold		Swing		

=== Dalston ===
Dalston (3)
Party	Candidate	Votes	%	±%
Labour	Michelle Gregory	2,544	46.9	
Labour	Sophie Linden	2,369	43.6	
Labour	Angus Mulready-Jones	2,234	41.2	
Liberal Democrats	Roger Billins	1,308	24.1	
Liberal Democrats	Bernardo Elduayen	1,045	19.3	
Green	Anna Cogger	1,025	18.9	
Liberal Democrats	Simon Molloy	1,012	18.6	
Green	Raymond Lyons	639	11.8	
Green	Jonathan Theodosiou	627	11.6	
Conservative	William Ledger	582	10.7	
Conservative	Clark Vasey	320	5.9	
Conservative	Fadile Unek	318	5.9	
Independent	Sophie Nathan	131	2.4	
Turnout		5,428	57.3	
Labour hold		Swing		
Labour hold		Swing		
Labour hold		Swing		

=== De Beauvoir ===
De Beauvoir (3)
Party	Candidate	Votes	%	±%
Labour	Robert Chapman	2,528	46.3	
Labour	Tom Ebbutt	2,456	45.0	
Labour	Gulay Icoz	2,307	42.3	
Liberal Democrats	Peter Friend	1,513	27.7	
Liberal Democrats	Nicholas Macmillan	1,245	22.8	
Conservative	Andrew Brooke	1,073	19.7	
Conservative	David Beddington	1,017	18.6	
Conservative	Eleanor Price	993	18.2	
Liberal Democrats	Piers Stobbs	856	15.7	
Green	Dylan Hodgkiss	800	14.7	
Turnout		5,458	57.4	
Labour hold		Swing		
Labour hold		Swing		
Labour hold		Swing		

=== Hackney Central ===
Hackney Central (3)
Party	Candidate	Votes	%	±%
Labour	Alan Laing	2,757	53.8	
Labour	Samantha Lloyd	2,619	51.1	
Labour	Vincent Stops	2,201	42.9	
Liberal Democrats	Dave Raval	1,397	27.3	
Liberal Democrats	Julia Slay	978	19.1	
Liberal Democrats	Reuben Thompson	822	16.0	
Green	James Burgess	747	14.6	
Green	Nnamdi Oleforo	591	11.5	
Green	Paul Ingram	562	11.0	
Conservative	Christopher O'Leary	413	8.1	
Conservative	Jose Santiago	397	7.7	
Turnout		5,126	58.6	
Labour hold		Swing		
Labour hold		Swing		
Labour hold		Swing		

=== Hackney Downs ===
Hackney Downs (3)
Party	Candidate	Votes	%	±%
Labour	Michael Desmond	2,359	47.4	
Labour	Alex Russell	1,836	36.9	
Labour	Rick Muir	1,783	35.8	
Liberal Democrats	Susan Horowitz	982	19.7	
Liberal Democrats	Mozes Eckstein	908	18.2	
Green	Stefan Carlberg	906	18.2	
Liberal Democrats	Gita Jacobson	868	17.4	
Green	Kate McKeevor	818	16.4	
Green	Elise Pinder	709	14.2	
Conservative	Olive Rice	434	8.7	
Conservative	Pamela Sills	359	7.2	
Conservative	Mark Westcott	344	6.9	
Turnout		4,979	57.6	
Labour hold		Swing		
Labour hold		Swing		
Labour hold		Swing		

=== Haggerston ===
Haggerston (3)
Party	Candidate	Votes	%	±%
Labour	Jonathan McShane	2,380	47.5	
Labour	Barry Buitekant	2,237	44.7	
Labour	Ann Munn	2,198	43.9	
Liberal Democrats	Christian Arrowsmith	1,272	25.4	
Liberal Democrats	Geoffrey Payne	1,121	22.4	
Liberal Democrats	John Sloboda	808	16.1	
Conservative	Doreen Bullock	785	15.7	
Conservative	Geoffrey Beattie	764	15.3	
Conservative	Samantha Fontaine	756	15.1	
Green	Lucy Sommers	706	14.1	
Liberal	Ben Rae	135	2.7	
Turnout		5,006	54.1	
Labour hold		Swing		
Labour hold		Swing		
Labour hold		Swing		

=== Hoxton ===
Hoxton (3)
Party	Candidate	Votes	%	±%
Labour	Philip Glanville	2,464	47.8	
Labour	Clay McKenzie	2,354	45.7	
Labour	Carole Williams	2,152	41.8	
Liberal Democrats	Salil Bhalla	1,335	25.9	
Liberal Democrats	Koray Dogan	1,320	25.6	
Liberal Democrats	James Driver	1,314	25.5	
Conservative	Jacqueline Palmer	907	17.6	
Conservative	John Tinley	766	14.9	
Conservative	Jessica Wilson	679	13.2	
Green	Jenny Lack	659	12.8	
Turnout		5,150	51.5	
Labour hold		Swing		
Labour hold		Swing		
Labour hold		Swing		

=== King's Park ===
King's Park (3)
Party	Candidate	Votes	%	±%
Labour	Sharon Patrick	2,824	65.0	
Labour	Julius Nkafu	2,575	59.2	
Labour	Saleem Siddiqui	2,504	57.6	
Liberal Democrats	Mark Whyte	1,306	30.1	
Green	Christopher Heaton	534	12.3	
Conservative	David Dodkin	450	10.4	
Conservative	Henry de Zoete	381	8.8	
Conservative	Emeka Egbuonu	346	8.0	
Turnout		4,346	57.6	
Labour hold		Swing		
Labour hold		Swing		
Labour hold		Swing		

=== Leabridge ===
Leabridge (3)
Party	Candidate	Votes	%	±%
Labour	Linda Kelly	2,878	57.6	
Labour	Ian Rathbone	2,559	51.2	
Labour	Deniz Oguzkanli	2,495	49.9	
Liberal Democrats	Melissa Harflett	1,206	24.1	
Green	Ruth Jenkins	909	18.2	
Green	Douglas Earl	824	16.5	
Green	Fatemeh Beyad	780	15.6	
Liberal Democrats	Shaun Sanders	758	15.2	
Conservative	Andrzej Nowobilski	297	5.9	
Conservative	Mary-Joan Onyejiaku	245	4.9	
Conservative	Chaya Odze	239	4.8	
Communist	Mick Carty	205	4.1	
Turnout		4,999	55.4	
Labour hold		Swing		
Labour hold		Swing		
Labour hold		Swing		

=== Lordship ===
Lordship (3)
Party	Candidate	Votes	%	±%
Labour	Edward Brown	1,827	38.0	
Conservative	Bernard Aussenberg	1,401	29.2	
Labour	Daniel Stevens	1,378	28.7	
Labour	Lee Whitehill	1,334	27.8	
Conservative	Matthew Coggins	1,261	26.3	
Conservative	Alexander Ellis	1,079	22.5	
Liberal Democrats	Deborah Nichols	912	19.0	
Liberal Democrats	Tony Harms	849	17.7	
Liberal Democrats	Lee Stacy	677	14.1	
Independent	Simon Tesler	467	9.7	
Green	Bethan Cobley	426	8.9	
Green	Mark Douglas	352	7.3	
Green	Bianca Veloso	187	3.9	
Turnout		4,803	62.4	
Labour gain from Conservative		Swing		
Conservative hold		Swing		
Labour gain from Conservative		Swing		

=== New River ===
New River (3)
Party	Candidate	Votes	%	±%
Labour	Sean Mulready	1,659	41.9	
Labour	Michael Jones	1,574	39.8	
Conservative	Maureen Middleton	1,489	37.6	
Labour	Yusuf Kilinc	1,450	36.7	
Conservative	Harvey Odze	1,380	34.9	
Conservative	Benzion Papier	1,353	34.2	
Liberal Democrats	Martyn Sibley	693	17.5	
Green	Aled Fisher	584	14.8	
Liberal Democrats	Mark Smullian	456	11.5	
Turnout		3,956	56.4	
Labour gain from Conservative		Swing		
Labour gain from Conservative		Swing		
Conservative hold		Swing		

=== Queensbridge ===
Queensbridge (3)
Party	Candidate	Votes	%	±%
Labour	Emma Plouviez	2,688	50.1	
Labour	Tom Price	2,573	48.0	
Labour	Patrick Vernon	2,249	42.0	
Liberal Democrats	Ian Gaskin	1,314	24.5	
Liberal Democrats	Allum Bokhari	1,242	23.2	
Green	Ralph Smyth	1,121	20.9	
Conservative	Andrew Boff	941	17.6	
Conservative	Hettie Peters	646	12.1	
Conservative	Marcel Matthew	634	11.8	
Independent	Vernon Williams	130	2.4	
Turnout		5,360	58.5	
Labour hold		Swing		
Labour hold		Swing		
Labour hold		Swing		

=== Springfield ===
Springfield (3)
Party	Candidate	Votes	%	±%
Conservative	Michael Levy	1,687	42.2	
Labour	Margaret Gordon	1,660	41.6	
Conservative	Simche Steinberger	1,567	39.2	
Conservative	Patricia Napier	1,553	38.9	
Labour	Ben Hayhurst	1,353	33.9	
Labour	Ron Reid-Edwards	1,267	31.7	
Liberal Democrats	Lucy Coffer	470	11.8	
Liberal Democrats	Dennis Donovan	458	11.5	
Liberal Democrats	Felicity Coffer	416	10.4	
Green	Margherita Martini-Brown	334	8.4	
Turnout		3,993	56.8	
Conservative hold		Swing		
Labour gain from Conservative		Swing		
Conservative hold		Swing		

=== Stoke Newington Central ===
Stoke Newington Central (3)
Party	Candidate	Votes	%	±%
Labour	Susan Fajana-Thomas	2,471	43.5	
Labour	Louisa Thomson	2,367	41.7	
Labour	Rita Krishna	2,362	41.6	
Green	Anna Hughes	1,649	29.1	
Green	Matthew Hanley	1,641	28.9	
Green	Joe Hulm	1,262	22.2	
Liberal Democrats	John Hodgson	1,077	19.0	
Liberal Democrats	Carl Nichols	775	13.7	
Liberal Democrats	Simon Scott-Daniels	735	13.0	
Conservative	Richie Benson	379	6.7	
Conservative	Hannah Devoy	358	6.3	
Conservative	Zeynep Karayilan	68	1.2	
Turnout		5,674	64.8	
Labour hold		Swing		
Labour hold		Swing		
Labour hold		Swing		

=== Victoria ===
Victoria (3)
Party	Candidate	Votes	%	±%
Labour	Katie Hanson	2,873	53.6	
Labour	Daniel Kemp	2,641	49.3	
Labour	Geoff Taylor	2,305	43.0	
Liberal Democrats	Heather James	1,288	24.0	
Liberal Democrats	Joe Jordan	994	18.5	
Liberal Democrats	Geraint Rees	729	13.6	
Conservative	Graeme Archer	710	13.2	
Green	Kate Charteris	707	13.2	
Conservative	Tony Burkson	683	12.7	
Green	Paul Homer	533	9.9	
Conservative	Winifred Saunders	500	9.3	
Green	Morgan Phillips	453	8.4	
Turnout		5,362	57.2	
Labour hold		Swing		
Labour hold		Swing		
Labour hold		Swing		

=== Wick ===
Wick (3)
Party	Candidate	Votes	%	±%
Labour	Chris Kennedy	2,339	54.1	
Labour	Jessica Webb	2,243	51.9	
Labour	Anntoinette Bramble	2,186	50.6	
Green	Sally Zlotowitz	942	21.8	
Liberal Democrats	Ben See	932	21.6	
Liberal Democrats	Mustafa Korel	857	19.8	
Conservative	Stephen Selby	525	12.1	
Conservative	Sanjay Sasidharan	455	10.5	
Christian	John Williams	309	7.1	
Conservative	Matthew Woods	202	4.7	
Christian	Rosemary Noel	169	3.9	
Christian	William Thompson	160	3.7	
Turnout		4,324	54.6	
Labour hold		Swing		
Labour hold		Swing		
Labour hold		Swing		

== See also ==
- 2010 United Kingdom local elections
