= 2002 Hackney London Borough Council election =

2002 English local election

Elections for Hackney London Borough Council in London were held on 2 May 2002. It was part of the wider 2002 London local elections. The Labour Party successfully retained control of the council winning 45 seats compared to the Conservative Party who won 9 and the Liberal Democrats who won 3.

== Results summary ==
Hackney local election result 2002
| Party | Seats | Net change | Votes |
|---|---|---|---|
| Labour | 45 | ▲13 | 53,669 |
| Conservative | 9 | ▼3 | 21,203 |
| Liberal Democrats | 3 | ▼6 | 13,526 |
| Green | 0 | Steady | 9,109 |
| Others | 0 | ▼2 | 8,443 |
| Total | 69 | N/A | 105,947 |
Source: BBC, London Datastore

== Ward results ==
=== Brownswood ===
Brownswood (3)
| Party | Candidate | Votes | % | ±% |
|---|---|---|---|---|
| Labour | Ian Peacock | 917 | 43.4 | {{{change}}} |
| Labour | Eseoghene Okonedo | 796 | {{{percentage}}} | {{{change}}} |
| Labour | Benjamin Linsley | 754 | {{{percentage}}} | {{{change}}} |
| Green | David Phillips | 704 | 33.3 | |
| Green | Klaus Graichen | 674 | | |
| Green | Izzy Lane | 576 | | |
| Conservative | Irene Lewington | 268 | 12.7 | |
| Conservative | Pamela Sills | 251 | | |
| socialist alliance | Thomas Rubens | 162 | 7.7 | |
| CPA | Jane Hogge | 61 | 2.9 | |
| Turnout | | | | |
