= 1964 Hackney London Borough Council election =

The 1964 Hackney Council election took place on 7 May 1964 to elect members of Hackney London Borough Council in London, England. The whole council was up for election and the Labour party gained control of the council.

== Background ==
These elections were the first to the newly formed borough. Previously elections had taken place in the Metropolitan Borough of Hackney, Metropolitan Borough of Shoreditch and Metropolitan Borough of Stoke Newington. These boroughs were joined to form the new London Borough of Hackney by the London Government Act 1963.

A total of 137 candidates stood in the election for the 60 seats being contested across 20 wards. 9 seats in three wards went unopposed. These included a full slate from the Labour party, while the Conservative and Liberal parties stood 36 and 32 respectively. Other candidates included 8 from the Communist party and 1 Independent Labour. There were 11 three-seat wards, 5 two-seat wards, 3 four-seat wards and 1 five-seat ward.

This election had aldermen as well as directly elected councillors. Labour got all 10 aldermen.

The Council was elected in 1964 as a "shadow authority" but did not start operations until 1 April 1965.

== Election result ==
The results saw Labour gain the new council after winning all 60 seats. Overall turnout in the election was 16.3%. This turnout included 243 postal votes.

== Ward results ==
Brownswood (2)
Party	Candidate	Votes	%	±%
Labour	M. M. Feldman	721		
Labour	D. Bright	718		
Conservative	A. J. Binyon	382		
Conservative	H. E. Phipp	377		
Turnout		1,132	20.1	
Labour win (new seat)				
Labour win (new seat)				

Chatham (3)
Party	Candidate	Votes	%	±%
Labour	E. G. H. Millen	Uncontested		
Labour	R. E. Owen	Uncontested		
Labour	P. G. Sylvester	Uncontested		
Turnout		n/a	n/a	
Labour win (new seat)				
Labour win (new seat)				
Labour win (new seat)				

Clissold (3)
Party	Candidate	Votes	%	±%
Labour	E. L. Edwards	847		
Labour	J. Stanton	834		
Labour	S. S. Cohen	824		
Conservative	D. A. Evans	399		
Conservative	W. J. Hawkins	389		
Conservative	C. H. E. Bird	342		
Communist	J. R. Bird	122		
Turnout		1,318	14.6	
Labour win (new seat)				
Labour win (new seat)				
Labour win (new seat)				

Dalston (3)
Party	Candidate	Votes	%	±%
Labour	D. West	834		
Labour	G. E. Silver	829		
Labour	D. McCarthy	815		
Conservative	C. D. Sills	424		
Conservative	R. Golland	398		
Conservative	K. S. Lightwood	315		
Turnout		1,238	15.6	
Labour win (new seat)				
Labour win (new seat)				
Labour win (new seat)				

De Beauvoir (3)
Party	Candidate	Votes	%	±%
Labour	A. P. Rose	837		
Labour	Miss J. G. Jepson	833		
Labour	A. Samuels	822		
Liberal	H. J. Newbrook	286		
Liberal	Mrs. E. A. Newbrook	283		
Liberal	R. W. Walker	281		
Conservative	W. J. Haste	196		
Conservative	O. T. Kenway	192		
Conservative	W. Sandler	189		
Independent Labour	E. J. Scott	26		
Turnout		1,364	17.8	
Labour win (new seat)				
Labour win (new seat)				
Labour win (new seat)				

Defoe (4)
Party	Candidate	Votes	%	±%
Labour	J. W. Cox	1,169		
Labour	B. Franks	1,144		
Labour	S. J. Lee	1,136		
Labour	A. Alexander	1,131		
Liberal	Miss P. S. Bradshaw	573		
Liberal	W. G. Webster	562		
Liberal	A. H. Waller	556		
Liberal	F. W. Maw	554		
Conservative	G. W. Allnutt	349		
Conservative	Mrs. M. C. Victor	338		
Conservative	G. F. Mills	337		
Conservative	W. Whitaker	330		
Turnout		2,122	20.0	
Labour win (new seat)				
Labour win (new seat)				
Labour win (new seat)				
Labour win (new seat)				

Downs (5)
Party	Candidate	Votes	%	±%
Labour	Mrs. O. Wagner	1,460		
Labour	J. C. Wobey	1,453		
Labour	A. Shekora	1,449		
Labour	S. A. Warne	1,446		
Labour	M. Ottolangui	1,435		
Conservative	G. H. Reeve	458		
Conservative	A. H. Sherman	455		
Conservative	A. Scutchings	444		
Conservative	R. Symons	435		
Conservative	W. W. Symons	423		
Communist	M. Goldman	205		
Turnout		2,088	14.2	
Labour win (new seat)				
Labour win (new seat)				
Labour win (new seat)				
Labour win (new seat)				
Labour win (new seat)				

Haggerston (2)
Party	Candidate	Votes	%	±%
Labour	K. G. Wilson	599		
Labour	R. J. Tallantire	594		
Liberal	T. Keen	179		
Liberal	J. R. Bugg	162		
Turnout		800	15.7	
Labour win (new seat)				
Labour win (new seat)				

Kingsmead (4)
Party	Candidate	Votes	%	±%
Labour	S. C. Davis	Uncontested		
Labour	Mrs. I. Foster	Uncontested		
Labour	S. W. Foster	Uncontested		
Labour	Mrs. M. Owen	Uncontested		
Turnout		n/a	n/a	
Labour win (new seat)				
Labour win (new seat)				
Labour win (new seat)				
Labour win (new seat)				

Leabridge (3)
Party	Candidate	Votes	%	±%
Labour	A. C. Harrison	922		
Labour	R. A. Spong	916		
Labour	R. Heisler	904		
Conservative	P. J. Bowyer	390		
Conservative	C. H. Hegerty	347		
Liberal	A. W. F. Evans	322		
Conservative	R. R. Atkins	315		
Liberal	A. W. Hurd	232		
Liberal	G. A. Watts	221		
Turnout		1,518	17.4	
Labour win (new seat)				
Labour win (new seat)				
Labour win (new seat)				

Moorfields (2)
Party	Candidate	Votes	%	±%
Labour	Mrs. G. M. Wright	521		
Labour	F. G. Aldred	504		
Liberal	A. D. Fowler	206		
Liberal	W. Stevenson	194		
Communist	T. Rampling	29		
Turnout		755	13.1	
Labour win (new seat)				
Labour win (new seat)				

New River (3)
Party	Candidate	Votes	%	±%
Labour	Mrs. O. Cox	1,471		
Labour	S. Mather	1,436		
Labour	C. E. Medhurst	1,406		
Liberal	H. J. Lobenstein	604		
Liberal	Jack Bright	536		
Liberal	R. B. James	502		
Conservative	J. Miller	309		
Conservative	P. A. J. Galbraith	297		
Conservative	J. S. Shepherd	287		
Communist	G. F. Anthony	144		
Turnout		2,439	29.9	
Labour win (new seat)				
Labour win (new seat)				
Labour win (new seat)				

Northfield (3)
Party	Candidate	Votes	%	±%
Labour	M. Blitz	978		
Labour	Mrs. C. Gordon	936		
Labour	Mrs. L. Karpin	909		
Liberal	A. H. Bloch	243		
Liberal	L. Black	227		
Liberal	I. Michaels	222		
Communist	M. Levy	91		
Turnout		1,322	16.3	
Labour win (new seat)				
Labour win (new seat)				
Labour win (new seat)				

Northwold (2)
Party	Candidate	Votes	%	±%
Labour	A. J. Cohen	Uncontested		
Labour	R. Lipman	Uncontested		
Turnout		n/a	n/a	
Labour win (new seat)				
Labour win (new seat)				

Queensbridge (4)
Party	Candidate	Votes	%	±%
Labour	G. W. Haynes	1,018		
Labour	E. H. Claridge	1,013		
Labour	C. F. Allman	1,007		
Labour	J. Hulstrom	1,001		
Conservative	V. A. French	288		
Conservative	D. N. Comber	285		
Conservative	L. H. Smith	282		
Conservative	D. A. McCann	280		
Liberal	S. F. Augar	170		
Liberal	F. Chambers	149		
Liberal	E. Marlow	149		
Liberal	S. W. Broder	146		
Communist	J. J. Bailey	102		
Turnout		1,555	13.6	
Labour win (new seat)				
Labour win (new seat)				
Labour win (new seat)				
Labour win (new seat)				

Rectory (2)
Party	Candidate	Votes	%	±%
Labour	C. W. Hilliard	632		
Labour	Mrs. S. Sherman	627		
Communist	J. Broaders	73		
Turnout		715	9.6	
Labour win (new seat)				
Labour win (new seat)				

Springfield (3)
Party	Candidate	Votes	%	±%
Labour	H. Freeman	1,154		
Labour	A. Super	1,141		
Labour	B. Feldman	1,120		
Liberal	C. Pater	326		
Liberal	D. Shap	309		
Liberal	S. Leff	303		
Turnout		1,518	18.7	
Labour win (new seat)				
Labour win (new seat)				
Labour win (new seat)				

Victoria (3)
Party	Candidate	Votes	%	±%
Labour	F. S. Shipp	873		
Labour	D. E. Ward	859		
Labour	A. J. Pedrick	847		
Conservative	A. R. A. Seaman	188		
Conservative	W. E. Fairman	168		
Conservative	S. H. Blanchflower	158		
Liberal	M. J. Fisher	139		
Liberal	T. D. Gates	132		
Liberal	G. A. McConnell	120		
Communist	M. Kolander	83		
Turnout		1,257	14.5	
Labour win (new seat)				
Labour win (new seat)				
Labour win (new seat)				

Wenlock (3)
Party	Candidate	Votes	%	±%
Labour	A. S. Simmonds	894		
Labour	C. H. Turner	887		
Labour	J. D. Welch	886		
Liberal	Miss J. A. Norman-Aylmer	146		
Liberal	Mrs. E. M. Norman-Aylmer	137		
Turnout		1,057	12.9	
Labour win (new seat)				
Labour win (new seat)				
Labour win (new seat)				

Wick (3)
Party	Candidate	Votes	%	±%
Labour	A. Heath	900		
Labour	Mrs. J. Heath	874		
Labour	S. F. Hand	869		
Conservative	J. W. Oakeley	260		
Conservative	R. E. Randall	258		
Conservative	J. S. Deathridge	236		
Turnout		1,175	14.1	
Labour win (new seat)				
Labour win (new seat)				
Labour win (new seat)				
