= Philip Glanville =

British Labour Party politician

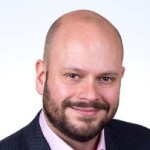
- Official portrait, c. 2022

Mayor of Hackney
- In office 19 September 2016 – 22 September 2023
- Preceded by: Jules Pipe
- Succeeded by: Caroline Woodley

Hackney Borough Councillor for Hoxton West Hoxton (2006–2014)
- In office 4 May 2006 – 19 September 2016
- Preceded by: Jonathan McShane
- Succeeded by: Yvonne Maxwell

Personal details
- Born: Philip Maurice Glanville; February 1980 (age 46) Uxbridge, London, England
- Party: Labour and Co-operative (suspended)
- Spouse: Giles McCrary (m. 2014)
- Education: London School of Economics (BSc)

Philip Maurice Glanville (born February 1980) is a British former Labour and Co-operative politician who served as Mayor of Hackney from 2016 to 2023, when he resigned following a scandal.

== Early life ==
Philip Maurice Glanville was born in February 1980.

== Hackney councillor ==
Glanville was elected as a councillor for the Hackney London Borough Council ward of Hoxton at the 2006 election. He was re-elected in 2010. At the 2014 election he was elected from the new Hoxton West ward. He spent three years as cabinet member for housing before briefly becoming deputy mayor in 2016.

== Mayor of Hackney ==
Glanville was elected Mayor of Hackney in a by-election held on 15 September 2016, becoming the borough's second directly elected mayor following the resignation of the incumbent, Jules Pipe. He supported several local community and trade union movements, joining lecturers at Loughborough University London on the picket line to protest changes in a university pension scheme. Glanville said that more housing should be built to tackle London's growing housing crisis.

Glanville lobbied to introduce 'curfews' for new nightlife venues, to manage the impact of late-night opening on local communities. This initiative was launched in an attempt to "encourage new pubs and clubs to consider hard-working neighbours trying to get a good night's sleep", while also encouraging new business development in Hackney.

In August 2023, Glanville was suspended by the Labour Party after it emerged he had attended a party with convicted paedophile and former Hackney councillor Tom Dewey after the latter's arrest, despite having been informed about it. He had previously claimed to have had no further contact with Dewey following the Council being notified of his arrest shortly after the 2022 local elections. On 16 September 2023, following condemnation from the local Green Party as well as from residents, Glanville resigned citing an "error in judgment" for trusting Dewey.

== Personal life ==
He entered a civil partnership with his husband Giles McCrary III, a native of Texas, in February 2011. The couple were then one of the first in the United Kingdom to convert their civil partnership into a marriage at a midnight ceremony on 10 December 2014.

Political offices
Preceded by Jules Pipe	Mayor of Hackney; 2016–2023	Succeeded by Caroline Woodley
Preceded by Jonathan McShane	Hackney Borough Councillor for Hoxton West; 2006–2016	Succeeded by Yvonne Maxwell
