= Monty Goldman =

Monty Goldman (born 1931) is an activist in the Communist Party of Britain and former Communist Party of Great Britain member who was expelled in the 1980s during that party's factional conflicts. Goldman has stood in elections for more than forty years.

Goldman, whose father Sidney participated in the Battle of Cable Street against Oswald Mosley's blackshirts, himself has a long record of campaigning against racism and fascism, having been a scout for the 43 Group in the late 1940s and having taken part in the protest against the appearance of the then British National Party (BNP) leader Nick Griffin on the BBC's Question Time television programme in October 2009.

Goldman stood for election for Mayor of Hackney in 2002 and 2010 and for Parliament for Hackney South and Shoreditch in 1997 and 2005. His latest electoral candidacy was on 6 May 2010, securing 2033 votes in the contest for mayor of Hackney, which he said was the highest Communist vote ever achieved in his lifetime as a candidate in Hackney.
