= Hackney London Borough Council =

Local authority for the London Borough of Hackney, England

Type
- Type: London borough council of the London Borough of Hackney
- Houses: Unicameral

Leadership
- Speaker: Antoinette Fernandez, Green since 28 May 2026
- Mayor: Zoë Garbett, Green since 11 May 2026
- Chief Executive: Dawn Carter-McDonald since August 2023

Structure
- Seats: 57 councillors plus elected mayor
- Political groups: Administration (42) Green (42) Other parties (15) Labour (9) Conservative (6)
- Length of term: Whole council elected every four years

Elections
- Voting system: Plurality at-large (FPTP)
- Last election: 7 May 2026
- Next election: 2 May 2030

Meeting place
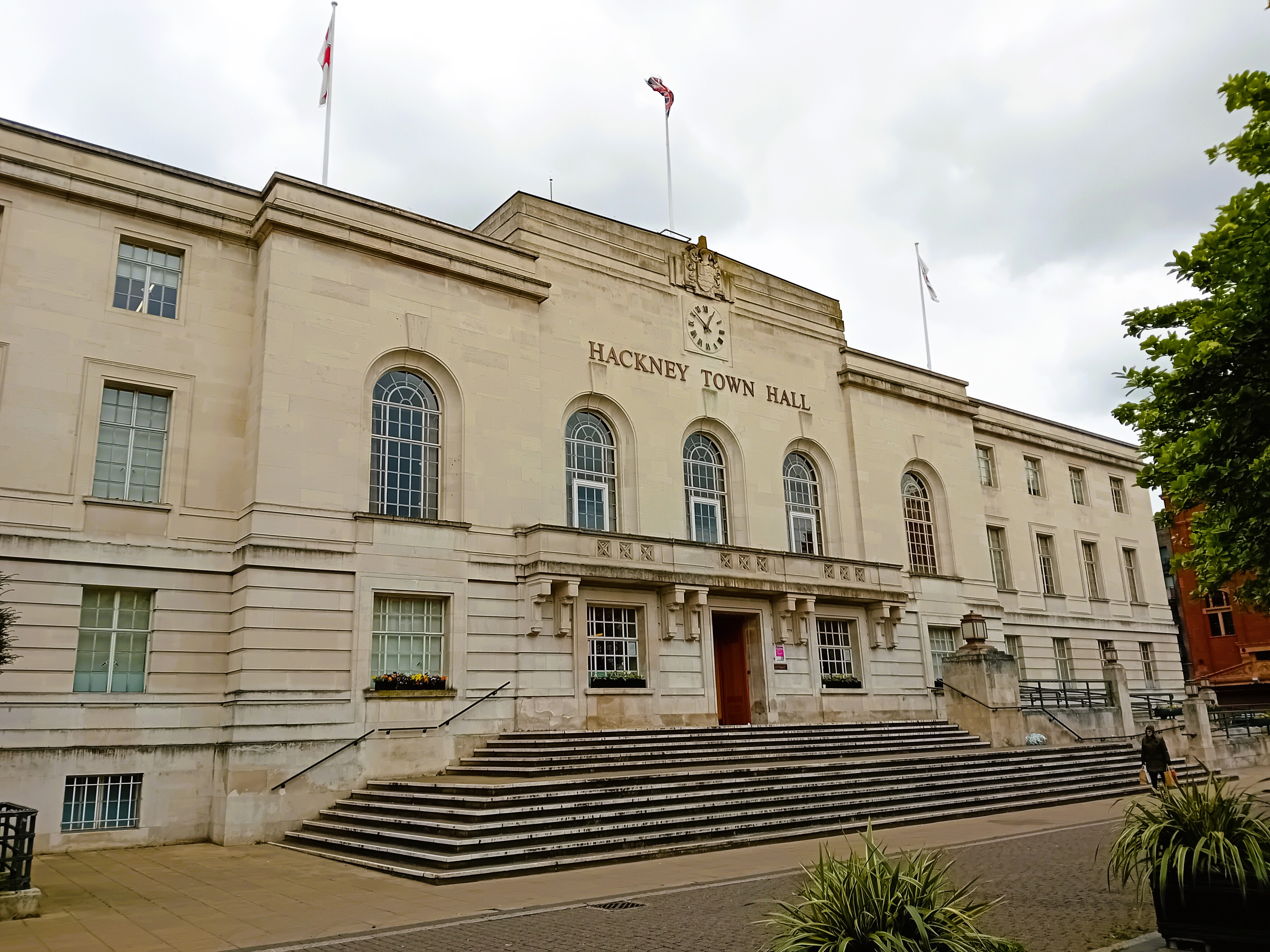
- Town Hall, Mare Street, Hackney, London, E8 1EA

Website
- hackney.gov.uk

Hackney London Borough Council, also known as Hackney Council, is the local authority for the London Borough of Hackney, in Greater London, England. The council is responsible for the provision of a range of services within the borough of Hackney. The council has been under Green Party majority control since 2026. Since 2002 the council has been led by a directly elected mayor. The council meets at Hackney Town Hall and has its main offices in the adjoining Hackney Service Centre.

== History ==
There has been a Hackney local authority since 1856 when the Hackney District was created covering the two ancient parishes of Hackney and Stoke Newington, governed by an elected board. It was one of the lower tier authorities within the area of the Metropolitan Board of Works, which was established to provide services across the metropolis of London. In 1889 the Metropolitan Board of Works' area was made the County of London. The Hackney District was dissolved in 1894 and the vestries of each parish took on the functions previously exercised by the district board. In 1900 the lower tier of local government across London was reorganised into metropolitan boroughs, each with a borough council, including Hackney, Shoreditch and Stoke Newington.

The London Borough of Hackney and its council were created under the London Government Act 1963, with the first election held in 1964. For its first year the council acted as a shadow authority alongside the area's outgoing authorities, being the councils of the three metropolitan boroughs of Hackney, Shoreditch and Stoke Newington. The new council formally came into its powers on 1 April 1965, at which point the old boroughs and their councils were abolished. The council's full legal name is "The Mayor and Burgesses of the London Borough of Hackney".

From 1965 until 1986 the council was a lower-tier authority, with upper-tier functions provided by the Greater London Council. The split of powers and functions meant that the Greater London Council was responsible for "wide area" services such as fire, ambulance, flood prevention, and refuse disposal; with the boroughs (including Hackney) responsible for "personal" services such as social care, libraries, cemeteries and refuse collection. The Greater London Council was abolished in 1986 and its functions passed to the London Boroughs, with some services provided through joint committees. Hackney became a local education authority in 1990 when the Inner London Education Authority was dissolved.

In the 1980s and early 1990s the left-wing Labour council clashed with the Conservative government on numerous occasions, notably during the rate-capping rebellion in 1985 and over the poll tax in 1990, with Hackney being one of the centres of the poll tax riots.

An independent inquiry in 1998 was highly critical of the council's investigations into one of its social workers, employed between 1981 and 1993, against whom a number of complaints of child sexual abuse had been made. He had been allowed to continue working. His position as a Labour activist and trade union official was said to have hindered the investigations. The social worker himself was never convicted, having died of an AIDS-related illness in 1995, but the police subsequently reported that they had been about to arrest him at the time of his death. The local Labour party split when the allegations were made public, which was a contributory factor to the council going under no overall control for a number of years in the late 1990s and early 2000s.

Since 2000 the Greater London Authority has taken some responsibility for highways and planning control from the council, but within the English local government system the council remains a "most purpose" authority in terms of the available range of powers and functions.

Former mayor Philip Glanville stood down in September 2023 after being suspended by the Labour Party when a photo emerged of him at a social event with an ex-councillor who had been convicted of possessing images sexual abuse of young children. Tom Dewey, the councillor involved, had been elected in 2022 and resigned after six days, due to his arrest. Caroline Woodley was subsequently elected in the resulting mayoral by-election in November 2023.

== Powers and functions ==
The local authority derives its powers and functions from the London Government Act 1963 and subsequent legislation, and has the powers and functions of a London borough council. It sets council tax and as a billing authority it also collects precepts for Greater London Authority functions and business rates. It sets planning policies which complement Greater London Authority and national policies, and decides on almost all planning applications accordingly. It is also the local education authority.

== Political control ==
The council has been under Green majority control since 2026.

The first election was held in 1964, initially operating as a shadow authority alongside the outgoing authorities until it came into its powers on 1 April 1965. Political control of the council since 1965 has been as follows:

Party in control	Years
Labour	1965–1968
Conservative	1968–1971
Labour	1971–1998
No overall control	1998–2002
Labour	2002–2026
Green	2026–

=== Leadership ===
Prior to 2002, political leadership was provided by the leader of the council and the mayor was a ceremonial role. The leaders from 1965 to 2002 were:

Councillor	Party	From	To
Martin Ottolangui	Labour	1965	1968
Charles Hegerty	Conservative	1968	1970
Don Bridgehouse	Conservative	1970	1971
Martin Ottolangui	Labour	1971	1981
John Kotz	Labour	1981	1982
Anthony Kendall	Labour	1982	1984
Hilda Kean	Labour	1984	1985
Tony Milwood	Labour	1985	1986
Andrew Puddephat	Labour	1986	1990
John McCafferty	Labour	1990	1995
Nick Tallentire	Labour	1995	1996
No leader (committees chaired by rotation)		1996	2001
Jules Pipe	Labour	Jun 2001	20 Oct 2002

In 2002 the council changed to having a directly elected Mayor of Hackney with executive powers. The ceremonial functions previously exercised by the mayor are now undertaken by a speaker instead. The mayors since 2002 have been: (Note: Mayoral terms of office run from the fourth day after polling day.)

Mayor	Party	From	To
Jules Pipe	Labour	21 Oct 2002	20 Jul 2016
Philip Glanville	Labour Co-op	19 Sept 2016	22 Sept 2023
Caroline Woodley	Labour	10 Nov 2023	10 May 2026
Zoë Garbett	Green	11 May 2026	

== Elections ==
Since the last boundary changes in 2014 the council has comprised the elected mayor plus 57 councillors representing 21 wards, with each ward electing two or three councillors. Elections are held every four years.

Following the 2026 election, and subsequent changes the composition of the council (excluding the elected mayor's seat) was:

Party	Councillors
Green	42
Labour	9
Conservative	6
Total	57

The next full council election is due in May 2030.

== Premises ==
The council meets at Hackney Town Hall on Mare Street, which was completed in 1937 for the old Hackney Borough Council.

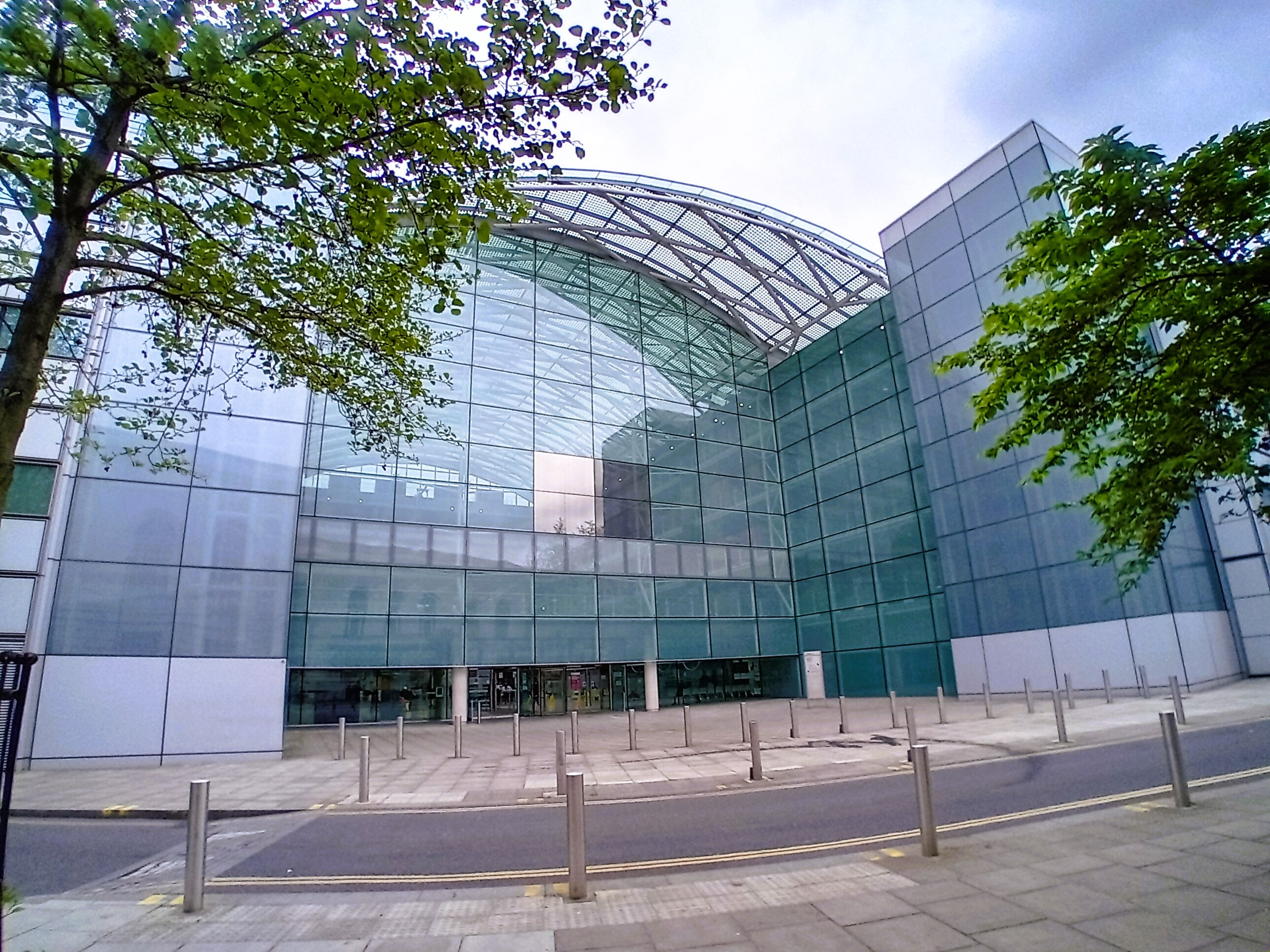
Hackney Service Centre, 1 Hillman Street, Hackney, London, E8 1DY: Council's main offices since 2010

The council has its main offices at the Hackney Service Centre at 1 Hillman Street, immediately west of the Town Hall. The Service Centre was completed for the council in 2010.
