= 2026 Hackney London Borough Council election =

2026 UK local government election

2026 Hackney Council election
- 7 May 2026

All 57 seats on Hackney London Borough Council 29 seats needed for a majority
	First party	Second party	Third party
Party	Green	Labour	Conservative
Last election	2 seats, 23.0%	50 seats, 58.9%	5 seats, 10.5%
Seats before	4	44	6
Seats won	42	9	6
Seat change	▲40	▼41	▲1
Popular vote	84,172	69,676	21,748
Percentage	43.1%	35.7%	11.1%
Swing	▲20.1pp	▼23.2pp	▲0.6pp
- Map of the results of the 2026 Hackney London Borough council election. Labour in red, Green in green and Conservatives in blue. Striped wards have mixed representation.
Council control before election
Labour
Council control after election
Green

The 2026 Hackney London Borough Council election took place on 7 May 2026, as part of the 2026 United Kingdom local elections. All 57 members of Hackney London Borough Council were elected, with 2026 Hackney mayoral election happening at the same time to determine the council's leader. The election took place alongside the local elections in the other London boroughs.

Prior to the election, the council was under Labour majority control. The election saw Labour lose most of its seats. The Green Party won a majority on the council for the first time, taking 42 of the 57 seats. As well as the Greens winning a majority of the seats, their candidate Zoë Garbett also won the associated mayoral election.

== Background ==
=== History ===
Result of the 2022 council election

The thirty-two London boroughs were established in 1965 by the London Government Act 1963. They are the principal authorities in Greater London and have responsibilities including education, housing, planning, highways, social services, libraries, recreation, waste, environmental health and revenue collection. Some of the powers are shared with the Greater London Authority, which also manages passenger transport, police and fire.

Since its formation, Hackney has usually been under Labour control except for a period from 1968 to 1971 when it was under Conservative control and from 1998 to 2002 when it was under no overall control. Councillors have mostly been elected from the Labour Party, Conservative Party and Liberal Democrats, and Green Party councillors, but the Liberal Democrats have not had any councillors since 2018. The council is run under a mayoral system, so its leader is the directly elected mayor of Hackney.

=== Preceding council term ===
At the 2022 elections, Labour's Philip Glanville had won the mayoralty and the party had also won 50 of the 57 seats on the council. Glanville subsequently resigned as mayor in September 2023 after a photo emerged of him at a social event with an ex-councillor who had been convicted of possessing images of sexual abuse of young children. A by-election for the mayoralty was held in November 2023, which was won by Labour's Caroline Woodley. Ian Sharer gained Woodley's council seat for the Conservatives at the subsequent by-election.

In May 2024, three Labour councillors left the party to form the Hackney Independent Socialist Group, or Hackney Independent Socialist Collective. Liam Davis (Green) gained Stoke Newington from Labour in a September 2024 by-election. M Can Ozsen became an independent in January 2026.

== Electoral process ==
Hackney, as is the case all other London borough councils, elects all of its councillors at once every four years, with the previous election having taken place in 2022. The election takes place by multi-member first-past-the-post voting, with each ward being represented by two or three councillors. Electors will have as many votes as there are councillors to be elected in their ward, with the top two or three being elected.

Hackney is one of five London councils led by a directly elected mayor; all voters across the borough vote to elect a mayor by first past the post system in addition to voting for their local councillor.

All registered electors (British, Irish, Commonwealth and European Union citizens) living in London aged 18 or over are entitled to vote in the election. People who live at two addresses in different councils, such as university students with different term-time and holiday addresses, are entitled to be registered for and vote in elections in both local authorities. Voting in-person at polling stations takes place from 07:00 to 22:00 on election day, and voters are able to apply for postal votes or proxy votes in advance of the election. Hackney is reportedly a top target for the Green Party of England and Wales.

== Previous council composition ==
After 2022 election		Before 2026 election		After 2026 election	
Party	Seats	Party	Seats	Party	Seats
Labour	50	Labour	43	Green	42
Conservative	5	Conservative	6	Labour	9
Green	2	Green	4	Conservative	6
—N/a		Hackney Independent Socialist	3		
—N/a		Independent	1		

== Results summary ==
Council composition after the 2022 election

Council composition after the 2026 election

2026 Hackney London Borough Council election
Party	Candidates	Seats	Gains	Losses	Net gain/loss	Seats %	Votes %	Votes	+/−
Green	50	42	40	-	▲40	73.68	43.09	84,172	▲20.09
Labour	57	9	-	41	▼41	15.79	35.67	69,676	▼23.23
Conservative	57	5	1	-	▲1	10.53	11.13	21,746	▲0.63
Liberal Democrats	38	0	-	-	Steady	-	3.73	7,295	▼1.77
Hackney Independent Socialist	6	0	-	-	Steady	-	2.89	5,649	NEW
Reform	24	0	-	-	Steady	-	2.57	5,025	NEW
Independent	8	0	-	-	Steady	-	0.78	1,527	▲0.77
TUSC	5	0	-	-	Steady	-	0.14	272	▼0.36

== Ward results ==
=== Brownswood ===
Brownswood (2)
Party	Candidate	Votes	%	±%
Green	Soraya Adejare	1,554		
Green	Florence Schechter	1,370		
Labour	Clare Potter	1152		
Labour	Mayiata Lahai	896		
Liberal Democrats	Mark Smulian	170		
Conservative	Pearce Branigan	160		
Reform	Michelle Tabone	144		
Conservative	Weronika Wojciechowska	108		
Majority		402		
Majority		218		
Turnout		6020	45.0	▲9.7
Green gain from Labour		Swing		
Green gain from Labour		Swing		

=== Cazenove ===
Cazenove (3)
Party	Candidate	Votes	%	±%
Green	Charlie Lawrie	1,462	40.2	
Conservative	Ian David Sharer*	1,409	38.8	
Green	Emma Neath	1,405	38.6	
Conservative	Simche Feldman	1,400	38.5	
Conservative	Hershi Moskovits	1,366	37.5	
Labour	Rida Oyebade	1,120	30.8	
Labour	Patrick Pinkerton*	1,036	28.5	
Labour	Stephen Sartain	817	22.4	
Independent	Ceren Sagir	389	10.7	
Independent	Des Barrow	269	7.4	
Liberal Democrats	Lorraine Shears	148	4.1	
Reform	Leo Castano	138	3.8	
Liberal Democrats	Rebekah Muinde	135	3.7	
Majority		289		
Majority		342		
Majority		285		
Turnout			41.7	▼10.5
Green gain from Labour		Swing		
Conservative hold		Swing		
Green gain from Labour		Swing		

=== Clissold ===
Clissold (3)
Party	Candidate	Votes	%	±%
Green	Sam Mathys	2,479		
Green	George Grün	2,185		
Labour	Rachel Maguire	1,747		
Labour	Sade Etti*	1,711		
Labour	Frank Baffour*	1,574		
Hackney Independent Socialist	Fliss Premru*	1,008		
Liberal Democrats	Joseph Bell	333		
Liberal Democrats	Andrew Neadley	264		
Conservative	Tareke Gregg	245		
Conservative	Agnieszka Machalewska	207		
Reform	Shae Cole	181		
Conservative	Nikodem Mikolajewski	166		
Green gain from Labour		Swing		
Green gain from Labour		Swing		
Labour gain from Hackney Independent Socialist		Swing		

=== Dalston ===
Dalston (2)
Party	Candidate	Votes	%	±%
Green	Zoë Garbett*	1,862		
Green	Rachel Nkiessu-Guifo	1,394		
Labour	Grace Adebayo*	897		
Labour	John McAreavey	635		
Liberal Democrats	Brandon Hadwin	140		
Conservative	Brandon Hullett	102		
Reform	Uzo Owoh	87		
Conservative	Jerry Sulaiman	72		
Majority		965		
Majority		497		
Turnout			40.6	▲2.8
Green hold		Swing		
Green gain from Labour		Swing		

=== De Beauvoir ===
De Beauvoir (2)
Party	Candidate	Votes	%	±%
Green	Gemma Per-Bo	1,198	49.8	
Green	Paul Anderson	1,157	48.1	
Labour	Jasmine Martins*	1,055	43.9	
Labour	Joe Walker*	971	40.4	
Reform	Emma Hulse	201	8.4	
Conservative	Million Joseph	201	8.4	
Liberal Democrats	Shelaine Mitchell	195	8.1	
Conservative	Shalom Nove	145	6.0	
Majority		143		
Majority		102		
Turnout			42.3	▼0.7
Green gain from Labour		Swing		
Green gain from Labour		Swing		

=== Hackney Central ===
Hackney Central (3)
Party	Candidate	Votes	%	±%
Green	Izzy Castello-Cortes	2,061	53.5	
Green	Pascale Frazer-Carroll	1,818	47.2	
Green	James Tilden	1,681	43.7	
Labour	Anna-Joy Rickard	1,295	33.6	
Labour	Zak Davies-Khan	1,237	32.1	
Labour	Sheila Suso-Runge*	1,176	30.5	
Liberal Democrats	Ken Gabbott-Rolph	317	8.2	
Liberal Democrats	Peter Kellett	294	7.6	
Independent	Clair Battaglino	242	6.3	
Reform	Abel Olasunbo	203	5.3	
Conservative	Ken Brownell	202	5.2	
Conservative	Eva Feldman	174	4.5	
Conservative	Joanna Wojciechowska	127	3.3	
TUSC	Margaret Trotter	73	1.9	
TUSC	Brian Debus	59	1.5	
Majority		766		
Majority		581		
Majority		444		
Turnout			39.5	▲6.1
Green gain from Labour		Swing		
Green gain from Labour		Swing		
Green gain from Labour		Swing		

=== Hackney Downs ===
Hackney Downs (3)
Party	Candidate	Votes	%	±%
Green	Alastair Binnie-Lubbock*	2,668	63.7	
Green	Laura-Louise Fairley	2,574	61.4	
Green	Dylan Law	2,499	59.6	
Labour	Michael Desmond*	1,220	29.1	
Labour	Michael Gribben	1,016	24.3	
Labour	Sudenaz Top	995	23.7	
Conservative	Serhan Bay	200	4.8	
Reform	Bibi Subratie	176	4.2	
Conservative	Judith Lisser	173	4.1	
Liberal Democrats	Les Kelly	168	4.0	
Liberal Democrats	Mohammed Sadiq	162	3.9	
Conservative	Keith Smeaton	139	3.3	
Majority		1,448		
Majority		1,558		
Majority		1,504		
Turnout			43.7	▲3.7
Green hold		Swing		
Green gain from Labour		Swing		
Green gain from Labour		Swing		

=== Hackney Wick ===
Hackney Wick (3)
Party	Candidate	Votes	%	±%
Green	Aaron Briddon	1,750	47.7	
Green	Tyrone Scott	1,727	47.1	
Green	Jam Anker	1,636	44.6	
Labour Co-op	Jessica Webb*	1,406	38.3	
Labour Co-op	Chris Kennedy*	1,369	37.3	
Labour Co-op	Joseph Ogundemuren*	1,236	33.7	
Reform	Syed Muzaffar	228	6.2	
Reform	Ionica Pop	206	5.6	
Liberal Democrats	Elechi Mbonye	190	5.2	
Conservative	Shirin Aiyubi	176	4.8	
Conservative	Philip Resnick	173	4.7	
Liberal Democrats	Matthew Wenban-Smith	161	4.4	
Conservative	Paulina Mierzejewska	149	4.1	
Majority		344		
Majority		358		
Majority		230		
Turnout			37.6	▲7.6
Green gain from Labour		Swing		
Green gain from Labour		Swing		
Green gain from Labour		Swing		

=== Haggerston ===
Haggerston (3)
Party	Candidate	Votes	%	±%
Green	Siobhan MacMahon	1,775	46.1	
Green	Charlene Concepcion	1,772	46.0	
Green	Nisa Sharif	1,615	41.9	
Labour	Femi Adekoya	1,467	38.1	
Labour	Midnight Ross*	1,317	34.2	
Labour	Jon Narcross*	1,238	32.2	
Reform	Christine Ball	300	7.8	
Liberal Democrats	Jonathan Munro	287	7.5	
Conservative	Monika Mierzejewska	262	6.8	
Conservative	Nosson Negin	220	5.7	
Liberal Democrats	Dave Raval	195	5.1	
Conservative	Bartosz Skonieczny	173	4.5	
Majority		308		
Majority		455		
Majority		377		
Turnout			36.6	▲7.7
Green gain from Labour		Swing		
Green gain from Labour		Swing		
Green gain from Labour		Swing		

=== Homerton ===
Homerton (3)
Party	Candidate	Votes	%	±%
Green	Zoe Holman	2,141	59.4	
Labour	Anna Lynch*	1,592	44.2	
Labour	Robert Chapman*	1,472	40.9	
Labour	Guy Nicholson*	1,287	35.7	
Hackney Independent Socialist	Alana Heaney	893	24.8	
Hackney Independent Socialist	Heather Mendick	873	24.2	
Liberal Democrats	Altan Hassan	301	8.4	
Liberal Democrats	Peter Mance	252	7.0	
Conservative	Milton Morris	209	5.8	
Conservative	Obinna Okeke	181	5.0	
Reform	Anthony Greatorex	143	4.0	
Conservative	Hristo Todorov	139	3.9	
Majority		549		
Majority		305		
Majority		185		
Turnout			40.0	▲9
Green gain from Labour		Swing		
Labour hold		Swing		
Labour hold		Swing		

=== Hoxton East and Shoreditch ===
Hoxton East and Shoreditch (3)
Party	Candidate	Votes	%	±%
Labour	Kam Adams*	1,286	45.4	
Green	Janet Lee	1,176	41.5	
Green	Mihai Chereji	1,118	39.4	
Labour	Anya Sizer*	1,103	38.9	
Labour	Faruk Tinaz	996	35.1	
Green	Romain Muhammad	969	34.2	
Reform	Vahid Almasi	225	7.9	
Liberal Democrats	Cimeon Ellerton-Kay	201	7.1	
Liberal Democrats	Peter Ivor Friend	178	6.3	
Conservative	Farhan Jaisin	164	5.8	
Conservative	Sandy Nkolomoni Mulamba	157	5.5	
Conservative	Christopher Okocha	154	5.4	
TUSC	Chris Newby	57	2.0	
Majority		110		
Majority		122		
Majority		149		
Turnout			33.6	+9.1
Labour hold		Swing		
Green gain from Labour		Swing		
Green gain from Labour		Swing		

=== Hoxton West ===
Hoxton West (3)
Party	Candidate	Votes	%	±%
Green	Nicholas Blincoe	1,207	38.6	
Labour	Ben Lucas*	1,200	38.4	
Green	Jas Zavar Crowe	1,187	38.0	
Green	Dave Carr	1,157	37.0	
Labour	Carole Williams*	1,169	37.4	
Labour	Clayeon McKenzie*	1,082	34.6	
Reform	Paul Kennedy	355	11.4	
Conservative	Mark Beckett	324	10.4	
Conservative	Bella Sharer	252	8.1	
Liberal Democrats	Thierry Levenq	251	8.0	
Conservative	Miroslawa Dabrowska	242	7.7	
Liberal Democrats	Geoffrey Payne	225	7.2	
Majority		7		
Majority		18		
Majority		5		
Turnout			31.8	▲5.2
Green gain from Labour		Swing		
Labour hold		Swing		
Green gain from Labour		Swing		

=== King's Park ===
King's Park (3)
Party	Candidate	Votes	%	±%
Green	Abi Kingston	2,166	53.1	
Green	Jasmine O'Connor	2,068	50.7	
Green	Emmanuel Onapa	1,941	47.6	
Labour	Baran Bayir	1,525	37.4	
Labour	Sharon Patrick*	1,444	35.4	
Labour	Lynne Troughton*	1,402	34.4	
Reform	Paul Clay	217	5.3	
Conservative	Annette Simpson	203	5.0	
Conservative	Katarzyna Czyynska	201	4.9	
Liberal Democrats	Juliette Heather Bigley	151	3.7	
Conservative	Agnieszka Iwinska	151	3.7	
Liberal Democrats	Peter Munro	106	2.6	
Majority		641		
Majority		624		
Majority		416		
Turnout			42.9	▲11
Green gain from Labour		Swing		
Green gain from Labour		Swing		
Green gain from Labour		Swing		

=== Lea Bridge ===
Lea Bridge (3)
Party	Candidate	Votes	%	±%
Green	Antoinette Fernandez	2,684	60.2	
Green	Bettina Maidment	2,461	55.2	
Green	Sally Zlotowitz	2,342	52.6	
Labour	Margaret Gordon*	1,414	31.7	
Labour	Ian Rathbone*	1,370	30.7	
Labour	Jennifer Parrillon	1,295	29.0	
Conservative	Beata Skonieczna	192	4.3	
Reform	Yehoshua Cymerman	173	3.9	
Conservative	Bella Weil	174	3.9	
Conservative	Marcin Skonieczny	154	3.5	
Liberal Democrats	Lars Wilmar	152	3.4	
Liberal Democrats	Tony Harms	148	3.3	
TUSC	James Ivens	83	1.9	
Majority		928		
Majority		1,091		
Majority		928		
Turnout			43.5	▲11.9
Green gain from Labour		Swing		
Green gain from Labour		Swing		
Green gain from Labour		Swing		

=== London Fields ===
London Fields (3)
Party	Candidate	Votes	%	±%
Green	Brenda Puech	1,872	47.2	
Labour Co-op	Antoinette Bramble*	1,849	46.6	
Green	Kwame Otiende	1,756	44.3	
Labour Co-op	George Gooch	1,362	34.3	
Labour Co-op	Owen Ramsay	1,287	32.5	
Hackney Independent Socialist	Sarah Byrne	868	21.9	
Independent	M Can Ozsen*	422	10.6	
Liberal Democrats	James Couceiro	256	6.5	
Reform	Anna Bevan	229	5.8	
Conservative	Meyer Rapaport	215	5.4	
Liberal Democrats	Jeff Gabbott-Rolph	183	4.6	
Conservative	Andrzej Zolnierzak	169	4.3	
Conservative	Iwona Zolnierzak	137	3.5	
Independent	Rafie Faruq	130	3.3	
Majority		585		
Majority		487		
Majority		394		
Turnout			41.5	▲8.1
Green gain from Labour		Swing		
Labour Co-op hold		Swing		
Green gain from Labour		Swing		

=== Shacklewell ===
Shacklewell (2)
Party	Candidate	Votes	%	±%
Green	Ülgen Semerci	1,479	52.5	
Green	Cathy Troupp	1,361	48.3	
Labour	Richard Lufkin*	986	35.0	
Labour	Arzu Demir	936	33.2	
Liberal Democrats	Mirza Malik	137	4.9	
Conservative	Christopher Sills	123	4.4	
Reform	Alex Mak	105	3.7	
Conservative	Pamela Sills	83	2.9	
Majority		493		
Majority		375		
Turnout			44.0	▲10
Green gain from Labour		Swing		
Green gain from Labour		Swing		

=== Springfield ===
Springfield (3)
Party	Candidate	Votes	%	±%
Conservative	Simche Steinberger*	1,971	51.8	
Conservative	Michael Levy*	1,932	50.8	
Conservative	Shaul Krautwirt	1,858	48.8	
Green	Anne Whitehead	926	24.3	
Green	Chaim Babad	908	23.9	
Green	Boris Knezevic	853	22.4	
Labour	Bartholomeusz James	569	15.0	
Labour	Funmi Oni	550	14.5	
Labour	Russell Foster	541	14.2	
Reform	Yisroel Leibowitz	249	6.5	
Reform	Ivon Fleming	183	4.8	
Liberal Democrats	Jemima Davis	129	3.4	
Liberal Democrats	Eva Steinhardt	116	3.0	
Majority		1,045		
Majority		1,024		
Majority		932		
Turnout			38.0	−2.2
Conservative hold		Swing		
Conservative hold		Swing		
Conservative hold		Swing		

=== Stamford Hill West ===
Stamford Hill West (2)
Party	Candidate	Votes	%	±%
Conservative	Benzion Papier	1,550	52.1	
Conservative	Hershy Lisser	1,428	48.0	
Green	Joe Cush	626	21.0	
Green	Greg Houston	571	19.2	
Labour	Jonathan England	529	17.8	
Labour	Adam Tyndall	467	15.7	
Reform	Aharon Klein	355	11.9	
Liberal Democrats	John Hodgson	62	2.1	
Liberal Democrats	Neel Kulkarni	44	1.5	
Independent	Khuram Hussain	24	0.8	
Independent	Yousaf Khan Hussain	23	0.8	

=== Stoke Newington ===
Stoke Newington (3)
Party	Candidate	Votes	%	±%
Green	Jacob Cable	2,644	53.8	
Green	Ifhat Shaheen	2,351	47.8	
Green	Reiner Tegtmeyer	2,286	46.5	
Labour	Susan Fajana-Thomas*	1,859	37.8	
Labour	Louis Burg	1,823	37.1	
Labour	Gilbert Smyth*	1,784	36.3	
Liberal Democrats	Simon De Deney	239	4.9	
Conservative	Pauline Levy	238	4.8	
Conservative	Oliver Middleton	202	4.1	
Liberal Democrats	Thrusie Maurseth-Cahill	188	3.8	
Reform	Charlton Richard Otto	181	3.7	
Conservative	Agnieszka Wypych	150	3.1	
Majority		785		
Majority		528		
Majority		427		
Turnout			48.1	▲9.5
Green hold		Swing		
Green gain from Labour		Swing		
Green gain from Labour		Swing		

=== Victoria ===
Victoria (3)
Party	Candidate	Votes	%	±%
Green	Rolf Dekker	2,090	61.0	
Labour	Joanna Sumner	1,696	49.5	
Labour	Daniel Rea	1,493	43.6	
Labour	Andy Farrell	1,446	42.2	
Hackney Independent Socialist	Penny Wrout*	1,010	29.5	
Hackney Independent Socialist	Claudia Turbet-Delof*	997	29.1	
Liberal Democrats	Heather James	290	8.5	
Reform	Chloe Edwards	287	8.4	
Conservative	Alison Brownell	279	8.1	
Liberal Democrats	Frederick Gotts	253	7.4	
Conservative	Alexander Dawson	247	7.2	
Conservative	Almog Adir	186	5.4	
Majority		594		
Majority		203		
Majority		47		
Turnout			42.3	+9.3
Green gain from Labour		Swing		
Labour gain from Hackney Independent Socialist		Swing		
Labour gain from Hackney Independent Socialist		Swing		

=== Woodberry Down ===
Woodberry Down (2)
Party	Candidate	Votes	%	±%
Labour	Sarah Young*	1,170	40.2	▼18.7
Green	Florence Cullen Davies	1,128	38.7	▲16.3
Labour	Sam Pallis	1,109	38.1	▼33.3
Green	Esther Jones Russell	1,062	36.5	▲14.8
Reform	David Grosz	251	8.6	N/A
Reform	Moty Moskovitz	208	7.1	N/A
Conservative	Harry Thomas	183	6.3	▼7.4
Liberal Democrats	Andrew Hubert Chojnicki	154	5.3	N/A
Conservative	Katarzyna Wanat	151	5.2	▼6.6
Liberal Democrats	Georgy Mordokhov	120	4.1	N/A
Independent	Senthil Kumar Thangavelu	28	1.0	N/A
Majority		42		
Majority		19		
Turnout			38.0	▲8
Labour hold		Swing	17.4	
Green gain from Labour		Swing	17.4	

== By-elections ==
=== Dalston ===
Following her election as Mayor of Hackney in the 2026 mayoral election, Zoë Garbett did not take up her seat as councillor for Dalston ward. Under section 71 of the Local Government Act 2000, a person may not simultaneously hold the offices of elected mayor and councillor within the same local authority, resulting in a vacancy in the ward and the triggering of a by-election.

Dalston
Party	Candidate	Votes	%	±%
Green	Manal Massalha	549	57.7	+21.8
Labour	Grace Adebayo	342	36.0	+18.7
Reform	Ivon Fleming	26	2.7	+1.0
Liberal Democrats	Peter Munro	24	2.5	−0.2
Conservative	Jerry Sulaiman	10	1.1	−0.9
Majority		207	21.8	−758
Turnout		951	13.81	−26.79
Green hold		Swing		

=== Hackney Central ===
James Tilden, elected as a Green councillor for Hackney Central in 2026, did not take up his seat after it emerged that he was employed as a teacher at a Hackney community school, making him legally an employee of Hackney Council and therefore disqualified from serving as a councillor for the same authority under section 80(1)(b) of the Local Government Act 1972.

Hackney Central
Party	Candidate	Votes	%	±%
Green	Noah Birkstead-Breen	676	45.2	+1.0
Labour	Sheila Suso-Runge	624	41.8	+11.3
Liberal Democrats	Ken Gabbott-Rolph	83	5.6	−2.6
Reform	Vahid Almasi	59	3.9	N/A
Conservative	Serhan Bay	49	3.3	−1.9
Majority		52	3.5	−762
Turnout		1,496	15.16	−24.34
Green hold		Swing		
