= London Fields (ward) =

Electoral ward in London, England

- Electoral ward for the Hackney London Borough Council
- London Fields ward boundaries since 2014
- Borough: Hackney
- County: Greater London
- Population: 12,682 (2021)
- Electorate: 9,144 (2022)
- Area: 1.055 square kilometres (0.407 sq mi)

Current electoral ward
- Created: 2014
- Number of members: 3
- Councillors: Anntoinette Bramble; M Can Ozsen; George Gooch
- Created from: Dalston, Hackney Central, Queensbridge
- GSS code: E05009381

London Fields is an electoral ward in the London Borough of Hackney. The ward was first used in the 2014 elections. It returns three councillors to Hackney London Borough Council.

== List of councillors ==
Term	Councillor	Party
2014–present	Anntoinette Bramble	Labour
2014–present	M Can Ozsen	Labour
2014–2022	Emma Plouviez	Labour
2022–2024	Lee Laudat-Scott	Labour
2024–present	George Gooch	Labour

== Hackney council elections ==
=== 2024 by-election ===
The by-election took place on 12 September 2024, following the resignation of Lee Laudat-Scott.

2024 London Fields by-election
Party	Candidate	Votes	%	±%
Labour	George Gooch	746	54.1	▼6.9
Independent	Sarah Byrne (Note: Sarah Byrne ran with support from Green Party and Hackney Socialist Independent Group)	437	31.7	New
Conservative	Diana Mikolajewska	72	5.2	New
Liberal Democrats	Peter Friend	71	5.2	▼8.0
Workers Party	Olivia Amber Taylor	52	3.8	New
Majority		309	22.4	
Turnout		1,378	14.49	
Labour hold		Swing		

=== 2022 election ===
The election took place on 5 May 2022.

2022 Hackney London Borough Council election: London Fields
Party	Candidate	Votes	%	±%
Labour	Anntoinette Bramble	2,156	81.5	
Labour	M Can Ozsen	1,741	65.8	
Labour	Lee Laudat-Scott	1,685	63.7	
Green	Carrie Hamilton	915	34.6	
Green	Graham Woodruff	498	18.8	
Green	Paul Urwin	474	17.9	
Liberal Democrats	Les Kelly	464	17.5	
Majority				
Turnout			33.4	
Labour hold		Swing		
Labour hold		Swing		
Labour hold		Swing		

=== 2018 election ===
The election took place on 3 May 2018.

2018 Hackney London Borough Council election: London Fields
Party	Candidate	Votes	%	±%
Labour	Anntoinette Bramble	2,378	71.1	
Labour	Emma Plouviez	1,972	59.0	
Labour	M Can Ozsen	1,933	57.8	
Green	Kim Cutler	587	17.5	
Green	Nicholas Lee	527	15.8	
Green	Catherine O'Shea	475	14.2	
Liberal Democrats	Silvia Mendonca	303	9.1	
Liberal Democrats	Tom Osborn	280	8.4	
Conservative	Tahmid Chowdhury	257	7.7	
Conservative	Marcel Matthew	231	6.9	
Liberal Democrats	Bill Upex	208	6.2	
Conservative	Alistair Richardson	202	6.0	
Majority				
Turnout			37.0	
Labour hold		Swing		
Labour hold		Swing		
Labour hold		Swing		

=== 2014 election ===
The election took place on 22 May 2014.

2014 Hackney London Borough Council election: London Fields
Party	Candidate	Votes	%	±%
Labour	Anntoinette Bramble	2,153		
Labour	M Can Ozsen	1,915		
Labour	Emma Plouviez	1,891		
Green	Fatemeh Beyad	857		
Green	Alexandra Olive	761		
Green	Daniel Theophanous	625		
Liberal Democrats	Sandra Driver	331		
Conservative	David Dodkin	321		
Conservative	Alexander Ellis	313		
Conservative	Michael Doudeskos	297		
TUSC	Fero Firat	188		
Liberal Democrats	Tom Osborn	180		
Liberal Democrats	Charles Jacobson	138		
TUSC	Diana Swingler	120		
Majority				
Turnout				
Labour win (new seat)				
Labour win (new seat)				
Labour win (new seat)				
