= Brownswood =

Brownswood may refer to:

- Brownswood (ward), Hackney, London, England
- Browns Wood, Walton, Milton Keynes, England
- Brownswood Recordings, record label
