= Dylan Law =

British politician

Deputy Mayor of Hackney
- Incumbent
- Assumed office 11 May 2026
- Preceded by: Guy Nicholson

Hackney Cabinet Member for Safer Homes and Housing Services
- Incumbent
- Assumed office 11 May 2026

Hackney Borough Councillor for Hackney Downs ward
- Incumbent
- Assumed office 11 May 2026
- Preceded by: Michael Desmond

Personal details
- Born: 2006 (age 20) Hackney, London, England
- Party: Green Party of England and Wales

Dylan Law (born 2006) is a British politician who has served as the Deputy Mayor of Hackney for the Green Party since 2026, and as a Hackney Councillor for Hackney Downs ward.

== Early life ==
Law was born in Hackney, and has three siblings. His mother is a primary school teacher and his father is from Guyana, Dylan went to City Academy where he was Head Boy.

He spent five years in Hackney Youth Parliament.

== Political career ==
Law joined the Green Party in 2025, after meeting local councillor Liam Davis. He cites Napoleon Bonaparte and Franklin D. Roosevelt as political inspirations, and also Zack Polanski and Zohran Mamdani.

Law was elected as a councillor in the 2026 Hackney London Borough Council election, and was subsequently appointed by Mayor Zoë Garbett as Deputy Mayor on 11 May 2026, also being given responsibilities for council housing management and repairs, the private rented sector, and housing affordability.

Political offices
Preceded by Guy Nicholson	Deputy Mayor of Hackney; 2026–present	Incumbent
Preceded by Michael Desmond	Hackney Borough Councillor for Hackney Downs; 2026–present	Incumbent
