= Shacklewell (ward) =

Electoral ward in London, England

- Electoral ward for the Hackney London Borough Council
- Shacklewell ward boundaries since 2014
- Borough: Hackney
- County: Greater London
- Population: 9,127 (2021)
- Electorate: 6,280 (2022)
- Major settlements: Shacklewell
- Area: 0.4578 square kilometres (0.1768 sq mi)

Current electoral ward
- Created: 2014
- Number of members: 2
- Councillors: Richard Lufkin; Ifraah Samatar
- Created from: Dalston, Stoke Newington Central
- GSS code: E05009382

Shacklewell is an electoral ward in the London Borough of Hackney. The ward was first used in the 2014 elections. It returns two councillors to Hackney London Borough Council.

== List of councillors ==
Term	Councillor	Party
2014–2022	Michelle Gregory	Labour
2014–present	Richard Lufkin	Labour
2022–present	Ifraah Samatar	Labour

== Hackney council elections ==
=== 2022 election ===
The election took place on 5 May 2022.

2022 Hackney London Borough Council election: Shacklewell
Party	Candidate	Votes	%	±%
Labour	Richard Lufkin	1,269	71.8	
Labour	Ifraah Samatar	969	54.8	
Green	Benjamin Hughes	458	25.9	
Green	Felix Thomson	314	17.8	
Liberal Democrats	Christian Adams	202	11.4	
Conservative	Andrzej Krajewski	163	9.2	
Ind. Network	Romaine Murray	160	9.1	
Turnout			34.0	
Labour hold		Swing		
Labour hold		Swing		

=== 2018 election ===
The election took place on 3 May 2018.

2018 Hackney London Borough Council election: Shacklewell
Party	Candidate	Votes	%	±%
Labour	Michelle Gregory	1,363	59.9	
Labour	Richard Lufkin	1,304	57.3	
Green	Stefan Liberadzki	339	14.9	
Green	James McDonald	313	13.7	
Liberal Democrats	Teresa Clark	165	7.2	
Liberal Democrats	Victor De Almeida Alberto	119	5.2	
Conservative	Andrzej Krajewski	96	4.2	
Conservative	Agnieszka Wypych	65	2.9	
Majority				
Turnout			36.2	
Labour hold		Swing		
Labour hold		Swing		

=== 2014 election ===
The election took place on 22 May 2014.

2014 Hackney London Borough Council election: Shacklewell
Party	Candidate	Votes	%	±%
Majority				
Turnout				
	Labour win (new seat)			
	Labour win (new seat)			
