= Hoxton East and Shoreditch =

- Electoral ward for the Hackney London Borough Council
- Hoxton East and Shoreditch ward boundaries since 2014
- Borough: Hackney
- County: Greater London
- Population: 11,768 (2021)
- Electorate: 8,444 (2022)
- Major settlements: Hoxton and Shoreditch
- Area: 0.9231 square kilometres (0.3564 sq mi)

Current electoral ward
- Created: 2014
- Number of members: 3
- Councillors: Kam Adams; Anya Sizer; Faruk Tinaz
- Created from: De Beauvoir, Haggerston, Hoxton
- GSS code: E05009377

Hoxton East and Shoreditch is an electoral ward in the London Borough of Hackney. The ward was first used in the 2014 elections. It returns three councillors to Hackney London Borough Council.

== List of councillors ==
Term	Councillor	Party
2014–2018	Tom Ebbutt	Labour
2014–2021	Feryal Clark	Labour
2014–present	Kam Adams	Labour
2018–2024	Steve Race	Labour
2021–present	Anya Sizer	Labour
2024–present	Faruk Tinaz	Labour

== Hackney council elections ==
=== 2024 by-election ===
The by-election was held on 2 May 2024. It took place on the same day as the 2024 London mayoral election, the 2024 London Assembly election and 14 other borough council by-elections across London.

2024 Hoxton East and Shoreditch by-election
Party	Candidate	Votes	%	±%
Labour	Faruk Tinaz	1,587		
Green	Liam Davis	560		
Conservative	Samuel Adele	318		
Liberal Democrats	Becket McGrath	217		
Turnout				
Labour hold		Swing		

=== 2022 election ===
The election took place on 5 May 2022.

2022 Hackney London Borough Council election: Hoxton East and Shoreditch (3)
Party	Candidate	Votes	%	±%
Labour	Kam Adams	1,354	74.4	
Labour	Anya Sizer	1,175	64.5	
Labour	Steve Race	1,081	59.4	
Green	Conan Cook	374	20.5	
Green	Chesca Walton	367	20.2	
Green	Nicholas Thorp	278	15.3	
Liberal Democrats	John Clinch	277	15.2	
Ind. Network	Peter Smorthit	234	12.9	
Conservative	Sandy Nkolomoni	230	12.6	
TUSC	Chris Newby	93	5.1	
Majority				
Turnout			24.5	
Labour hold		Swing		
Labour hold		Swing		
Labour hold		Swing		

=== 2021 by-election ===
The by-election took place on 6 May 2021, following the resignation of Feryal Clark. It was held on the same day as the 2021 London mayoral election and 2021 London Assembly election.

2021 Hoxton East and Shoreditch by-election
Party	Candidate	Votes	%	±%
Labour	Anya Sizer	1,504	54.0	−10.8
Green	Charlotte Owusu-Allen	454	16.3	+1.3
Conservative	Jasmine Cannon-Ikurusi	307	11.0	+2.8
Liberal Democrats	Helen Baxter	253	9.1	+0.9
Independent	Niall Crowley	222	8.0	+8.0
TUSC	Chris Newby	47	1.7	−2.0
Majority		1,050	37.7	
Turnout		2,787		
Labour hold		Swing		

=== 2018 election ===
The election took place on 3 May 2018.

2018 Hackney London Borough Council election: Hoxton East and Shoreditch (3)
Party	Candidate	Votes	%	±%
Labour	Kam Adams	1,530	67.5	
Labour	Feryal Demirci	1,411	62.2	
Labour	Steve Race	1,230	54.2	
Green	Scott Elliott	355	15.7	
Green	Florence Wedmore	298	13.1	
Green	Samir Jeraj	233	10.3	
Liberal Democrats	Peter Friend	194	8.6	
Liberal Democrats	John Clinch	193	8.5	
Conservative	Philip Kenyon	193	8.5	
Liberal Democrats	Lorraine Shears	191	8.4	
Conservative	John Tinley	174	7.7	
Conservative	Louis Mosley	153	6.7	
TUSC	Chris Newby	88	3.9	
Majority				
Turnout			28.9	
Labour hold		Swing		
Labour hold		Swing		
Labour hold		Swing		

=== 2014 election ===
The election took place on 22 May 2014.

2014 Hackney London Borough Council election: Hoxton East and Shoreditch (3)
Party	Candidate	Votes	%	±%
Labour	Kam Adams	1,588		
Labour	Feryal Demirci	1,421		
Labour	Tom Ebbutt	1,385		
Green	Thomas Bailey	444		
Green	Rachel Chance	392		
Green	Jonathan Cowdrill	358		
Conservative	Christopher Darlington Sills	356		
Conservative	Thomas Harvey Spiller	355		
Conservative	Jack Tinley	323		
Liberal Democrats	John Clinch	185		
Liberal Democrats	Peter Friend	185		
Liberal Democrats	Kat Bavage	172		
TUSC	Judith Beishon	126		
TUSC	Paul Mattsson	77		
Majority				
Turnout				
Labour win (new seat)				
Labour win (new seat)				
Labour win (new seat)				
