= Hackney Downs (ward) =

Ward in Hackney, London

- Electoral ward for the Hackney London Borough Council
- Hackney Downs boundaries since 2014
- Borough: Hackney
- County: Greater London
- Population: 12,998 (2021)
- Electorate: 9,469 (2022)
- Area: 1.019 square kilometres (0.393 sq mi)

Current electoral ward
- Created: 2002
- Number of members: 3
- Councillors: Michael Desmond; Sem Moema; Alastair Binnie-Lubbock
- ONS code: 00AMGH (2002–2014)
- GSS code: E05000238 (2002–2014); E05009373 (2014–present)

Hackney Downs is an electoral ward in the London Borough of Hackney, corresponding roughly to the Hackney Downs area of London, UK and forms part of the Hackney North and Stoke Newington constituency. It was created for the May, 2002 local election. There was previously a Downs ward from 1965 to 1978. The ward returns three councillors every four years to Hackney Borough Council.

== Hackney council elections since 2014 ==
There was a revision of ward boundaries in Hackney in 2014.

=== 2026 ===
2026 Hackney London Borough Council election: Hackney Downs
| Party | Candidate | Votes | % | ±% |
|---|---|---|---|---|
| Green | Alastair Binnie-Lubbock* | 2,668 | 63.7 | |
| Green | Laura-Louise Fairley | 2,574 | 61.4 | |
| Green | Dylan Law | 2,499 | 59.6 | |
| Labour | Michael Desmond* | 1,220 | 29.1 | |
| Labour | Michael Gribben | 1,016 | 24.3 | |
| Labour | Sudenaz Top | 995 | 23.7 | |
| Conservative | Serhan Bay | 200 | 4.8 | |
| Reform | Bibi Subratie | 176 | 4.2 | |
| Conservative | Judith Lisser | 173 | 4.1 | |
| Liberal Democrats | Les Kelly | 168 | 4.0 | |
| Liberal Democrats | Mohammed Sadiq | 162 | 3.9 | |
| Conservative | Keith Smeaton | 139 | 3.3 | |
| Turnout | | | 43.7 | ▲3.7 |
| Green hold | | Swing | | |
| Green gain from Labour | | Swing | | |
| Green gain from Labour | | Swing | | |

=== 2022 election ===
The election took place on 5 May 2022.

2022 Hackney London Borough Council election: Hackney Downs
| Party | Candidate | Votes | % | ±% |
|---|---|---|---|---|
| Labour | Michael Desmond | 1,823 | 51.3 | |
| Labour | Sem Moema | 1,748 | 49.2 | |
| Green | Alastair Binnie-Lubbock | 1,667 | 46.9 | |
| Labour | Anna-Joy Rickard | 1,636 | 46.1 | |
| Green | Bettina Maidment | 1,573 | 44.3 | |
| Green | Charlie Norman | 1,316 | 37.0 | |
| Conservative | Agnieszka Cuellar-Bridy | 194 | 5.5 | |
| Liberal Democrats | Erika Merguigi | 184 | 5.2 | |
| Conservative | Joanna Wojciechowska | 161 | 4.5 | |
| Conservative | Nikodem Mikolajewski | 155 | 4.4 | |
| Ind. Network | Ruth Parkinson | 101 | 2.8 | |
| TUSC | Clare Doyle | 99 | 2.8 | |
| Turnout | | | 40.0 | |
| Labour hold | | Swing | | |
| Labour hold | | Swing | | |
| Green gain from Labour | | Swing | | |

=== 2018 election ===
The election took place on 3 May 2018.

2018 Hackney London Borough Council election: Hackney Downs
| Party | Candidate | Votes | % | ±% |
|---|---|---|---|---|
| Labour | Michael Desmond | 2,076 | 56.7 | −0.6 |
| Labour | Anna-Joy Rickard | 1,852 | 50.6 | −6.3 |
| Labour | Sem Moema | 1,687 | 46.1 | −8.6 |
| Green | Alastair Binnie-Lubbock | 1,597 | 43.6 | +20.8 |
| Green | Sheila Menon | 1,134 | 31.0 | +8.4 |
| Green | Sally Zlotowitz | 1,074 | 29.3 | +9.8 |
| Conservative | Mohammed Lunat | 229 | 6.3 | +0.5 |
| Conservative | Yasmin Lunat | 214 | 5.8 | ±0.0 |
| Conservative | Agnieszka Rolkiewicz | 122 | 3.3 | −0.7 |
| Majority | | | | |
| Turnout | | | 39.7 | |
| Labour hold | | Swing | | |
| Labour hold | | Swing | | |
| Labour hold | | Swing | | |

=== 2016 by-election ===
The by-election took place on 5 May 2016.

2016 Hackney Downs by-election
| Party | Candidate | Votes | % | ±% |
|---|---|---|---|---|
| Labour | Sem Moema | 2,614 | 59.8 | −0.4 |
| Green | Alastair Binnie-Lubbock | 1,067 | 24.4 | +0.4 |
| Conservative | Nicola Benjamin | 350 | 8.0 | +1.9 |
| Liberal Democrats | Mohammed Sadiq | 338 | 7.7 | −2.0 |
| Majority | | 1,547 | | |
| Turnout | | 4,369 | 58% | |
| Labour hold | | Swing | | |

=== 2014 election ===
The election took place on 22 May 2014.

2014 Hackney London Borough Council election: Hackney Downs
| Party | Candidate | Votes | % | ±% |
|---|---|---|---|---|
| Labour | Michael Desmond | 2,115 | 57.3 | |
| Labour | Anna-Joy Rickard | 2,100 | 56.9 | |
| Labour | Rick Muir | 2,020 | 54.7 | |
| Green | Alexander Brown | 843 | 22.8 | |
| Green | Stuart Coggins | 834 | 22.6 | |
| Green | Andrew Guise | 719 | 19.5 | |
| Liberal Democrats | Teena Lashmore | 342 | 9.3 | |
| Liberal Democrats | Mohammed Sadiq | 293 | 7.9 | |
| Liberal Democrats | Garry Malcolm | 249 | 6.7 | |
| Conservative | Amy Gray | 214 | 5.8 | |
| Conservative | Duncan Gray | 214 | 5.8 | |
| Conservative | Izabel Leosz | 149 | 4.0 | |
| Majority | | | | |
| Turnout | | 3,691 | 39.8 | |
| Labour win (new boundaries) | | | | |
| Labour win (new boundaries) | | | | |
| Labour win (new boundaries) | | | | |

== 2002–2014 Hackney council elections ==
=== 2010 election ===
The election on 6 May 2010 took place on the same day as the United Kingdom general election.

2010 Hackney London Borough Council election: Hackney Downs
| Party | Candidate | Votes | % | ±% |
|---|---|---|---|---|
| Labour | Michael Desmond | 2,359 | 50.4 | |
| Labour | Alex Russell | 1,836 | | |
| Labour | Rick Muir | 1,783 | | |
| Liberal Democrats | Susan Horowitz | 982 | 21.0 | |
| Liberal Democrats | Mozes Eckstein | 908 | | |
| Green | Stefan Carlberg | 906 | 19.4 | |
| Liberal Democrats | Gita Jacobson | 868 | | |
| Green | Kate McKeevor | 818 | | |
| Green | Elise Pinder | 709 | | |
| Conservative | Olive Rice | 434 | 9.3 | |
| Conservative | Pamela Sills | 359 | | |
| Conservative | Mark Westcott | 344 | | |
| Turnout | | 4,979 | 58 | |
| Labour hold | | Swing | | |
| Labour hold | | Swing | | |
| Labour hold | | Swing | | |

=== 2006 election ===
The election took place on 4 May 2006.

2006 Hackney London Borough Council election: Hackney Downs
| Party | Candidate | Votes | % | ±% |
|---|---|---|---|---|
| Labour | Michael Desmond | 1,054 | 46.3 | |
| Labour | Faizullah Khan | 1,048 | | |
| Labour | Sem Moema | 830 | | |
| Green | Michael Jefford | 668 | 29.3 | |
| Green | Joy MacKeith | 661 | | |
| Liberal Democrats | Chaim Hochhauser | 321 | 14.1 | |
| Liberal Democrats | Nota Kreiman | 290 | | |
| Liberal Democrats | Jeffrey Shenker | 279 | | |
| Conservative | Peter Fazzani | 234 | 10.3 | |
| Conservative | Yvonne Kleinberg | 185 | | |
| Conservative | Vera Landau | 178 | | |
| Turnout | | | 30.4 | |
| Labour hold | | Swing | | |
| Labour hold | | Swing | | |
| Labour hold | | Swing | | |

=== 2002 election ===
The election took place on 2 May 2002.

2002 Hackney London Borough Council election: Hackney Downs
| Party | Candidate | Votes | % | ±% |
|---|---|---|---|---|
| Labour | Jessica Crowe | 1,152 | | |
| Labour | Michael Desmond | 1,011 | | |
| Labour | Faizullah Khan | 972 | | |
| Green | Christopher Dixon | 685 | | |
| Socialist Alliance | Helen Matcham | 356 | | |
| Conservative | Lilian Lonsdale | 207 | | |
| Conservative | Peter Lonsdale | 201 | | |
| Conservative | Halide Mehmet | 201 | | |
| CPA | Glorya Sealy | 98 | | |
| Majority | | | | |
| Turnout | | | | |
| Labour win (new seat) | | | | |
| Labour win (new seat) | | | | |
| Labour win (new seat) | | | | |

== Demography ==
In 2001, Hackney Downs ward had a total population of 10,294. This compares with the average ward population within the borough of 10,674. At the 2011 Census, the population of the ward had increased to 12,921.
