= Hackney Central (ward) =

- Electoral ward for the Hackney London Borough Council
- Hackney Central boundaries since 2014
- Borough: Hackney
- County: Greater London
- Population: 12,719 (2021)
- Electorate: 9,492 (2022)
- Area: 0.7600 square kilometres (0.2934 sq mi)

Current electoral ward
- Created: 2002
- Number of members: 3
- Councillors: Izzy Castello-Cortes; Pascale Frazer-Carroll; Noah Birksted-Breen
- ONS code: 00AMGG (2002–2014)
- GSS code: E05000237 (2002–2014); E05009372 (2014–present)

Hackney Central is an electoral ward in the London Borough of Hackney. It returns three councillors to Hackney London Borough Council, with an election every four years.

== List of councillors ==
Term	Councillor	Party
2002–2014	Samantha Lloyd	Labour
2002–2012	Alan Laing	Labour
2002–2022	Vincent Stops	Labour
2012–2026	Ben Hayhurst	Labour
2014–2016	Sophie Linden	Labour
2016–2026	Sophie Conway	Labour
2022–2026	Sheila Suso-Runge	Labour
2026–present	Izzy Castello-Cortes	Green
2026–present	Pascale Frazer-Carroll	Green
2026–2026	James Tilden	Green
2026–present	Noah Birksted-Breen	Green

== Hackney council elections since 2014 ==
There was a revision of ward boundaries in Hackney in 2014.

=== 2026 by-election ===
The by-election took place on 25 June 2026, following the disqualification of James Tilden.

2026 Hackney Central by-election
Party	Candidate	Votes	%	±%
Green	Noah Birksted-Breen	676	45.3	−1.6
Labour	Sheila Suso-Runge	624	41.9	+12.4
Liberal Democrats	Ken Gabbott-Rolph	83	5.6	−1.6
Reform	Vahid Almasi	59	4.0	−0.7
Conservative	Serhan Bay	49	3.3	−1.3
Turnout			15.6	
Green hold		Swing		

=== 2026 election ===
The election took place on 7 May 2026.

2026 Hackney London Borough Council election: Hackney Central
Party	Candidate	Votes	%	±%
Green	Izzy Castello-Cortes	2,061	53.5	
Green	Pascale Frazer-Carroll	1,818	47.2	
Green	James Tilden	1,681	43.7	
Labour	Anna-Joy Rickard	1,295	33.6	
Labour	Zak Davies-Khan	1,237	32.1	
Labour	Sheila Suso-Runge	1,176	30.5	
Liberal Democrats	Ken Gabbott-Rolph	317	8.2	
Liberal Democrats	Peter Kellett	294	7.6	
Independent	Clair Battaglino	242	6.3	
Reform	Abel Olasunbo	203	5.3	
Conservative	Ken Brownell	202	5.2	
Conservative	Eva Feldman	174	4.5	
Conservative	Joanna Wojciechowska	127	3.3	
TUSC	Margaret Trotter	73	1.9	
TUSC	Brian Debus	59	1.5	
Majority		766		
Majority		581		
Majority		444		
Turnout			39.5	▲6.1
Green gain from Labour		Swing		
Green gain from Labour		Swing		
Green gain from Labour		Swing		

=== 2022 election ===
The election took place on 5 May 2022.

2022 Hackney London Borough Council election: Hackney Central
Party	Candidate	Votes	%	±%
Labour	Sophie Conway	2,214	73.9	
Labour	Sheila Suso-Runge	1,994	66.6	
Labour	Ben Hayhurst	1,877	62.7	
Green	Florence Wedmore	651	21.7	
Green	Nicholas Costley-White	561	18.7	
Green	Stefan Liberadzki	519	17.3	
Liberal Democrats	Patricia Holloway	268	8.9	
Ind. Network	Clair Battaglino	214	7.1	
Ind. Network	Imogen O'Rorke	189	6.3	
Ind. Network	Desmond Kirby	173	5.8	
Liberal Democrats	Dave Raval	170	5.7	
Liberal Democrats	Peter Kellett	158	5.3	
Turnout			33.4	
Labour hold		Swing		
Labour hold		Swing		
Labour hold		Swing		

=== 2018 election ===
The election took place on 3 May 2018.

2018 Hackney London Borough Council election: Hackney Central
Party	Candidate	Votes	%	±%
Labour	Sophie Conway	2,475	74.3	
Labour	Ben Hayhurst	2,142	64.3	
Labour	Vincent Stops	1,917	57.5	
Green	Charlene Concepcion	629	18.9	
Green	Siobhan MacMahon	576	17.3	
Green	Alec Rossiter	438	13.1	
Liberal Democrats	Dave Raval	256	7.7	
Liberal Democrats	Jamie Chamberlain	215	6.5	
Liberal Democrats	Joseph Richards	190	5.7	
Conservative	Stephanie Schwarz	186	5.6	
Conservative	Sampson Ewurum	177	5.3	
Conservative	Heather Whitelaw	139	4.2	
Majority				
Turnout			35.4	
Labour hold		Swing		
Labour hold		Swing		
Labour hold		Swing		

=== 2016 by-election ===
The by-election took place on 21 July 2016, following the resignation of Sophie Linden.

2016 Hackney Central by-election
Party	Candidate	Votes	%	±%
Labour	Sophie Conway	1,354	75.2	+11.2
Green	Siobhan MacMahon	178	9.9	−13.0
Liberal Democrats	Russell French	113	6.3	−1.1
Conservative	Christopher Sills	101	5.6	−0.2
Independent	Mustafa Korel	55	3.1	N/A
Majority		1,176	65.3	+24.2
Turnout		1,801	18.6	−18.5
Labour hold		Swing		

=== 2014 election ===
The election took place on 22 May 2014.

2014 Hackney London Borough Council election: Hackney Central
Party	Candidate	Votes	%	±%
Labour	Sophie Linden	2,094		
Labour	Ben Hayhurst	2,082		
Labour	Vincent Stops	1,916		
Green	Christopher Venables	751		
Green	George Graham	738		
Green	Alec Rossiter	717		
Liberal Democrats	Reuben Thompson-Wood	240		
Liberal Democrats	James Lyons	202		
Conservative	Heather Whitelaw	190		
Conservative	Fadile Unek	184		
Conservative	Elzbieta Wancowicz	167		
Turnout				
Labour win (new boundaries)				
Labour win (new boundaries)				
Labour win (new boundaries)				

== 2002–2014 Hackney council elections ==
Hackney Central ward boundaries from 2002 to 2014

=== 2012 by-election ===
The by-election took place on 3 May 2012, following the resignation of Alan Laing.

2012 Hackney Central by-election
Party	Candidate	Votes	%	±%
Labour	Ben Hayhurst	2,438		
Green	Mustafa Korel	545		
Liberal Democrats	Pauline Pearce	394		
Conservative	Andrew Boff	296		
Turnout			41.5	
Labour hold		Swing		

=== 2010 election ===
The election on 6 May 2010 took place on the same day as the United Kingdom general election.

2010 Hackney London Borough Council election: Hackney Central
Party	Candidate	Votes	%	±%
Labour	Alan Laing	2,757	51.9	
Labour	Samantha Lloyd	2,619		
Labour	Vincent Stops	2,201		
Liberal Democrats	Dave Raval	1,397	26.3	
Liberal Democrats	Julia Slay	978		
Liberal Democrats	Reuben Thompson	822		
Green	James Burgess	747	14.1	
Green	Nnamdi Oleforo	591		
Green	Paul Ingram	562		
Conservative	Christopher O'Leary	413	7.8	
Conservative	Jose Santiago	397		
Turnout		5,126	59	
Labour hold		Swing		
Labour hold		Swing		
Labour hold		Swing		

=== 2006 election ===
The election took place on 4 May 2006.

2006 Hackney London Borough Council election: Hackney Central
Party	Candidate	Votes	%	±%
Labour	Samantha Lloyd	1,259	43.3	
Labour	Alan Laing	1,233		
Labour	Vincent Stops	1,061		
Green	Terence Gallagher	598	20.6	
Liberal Democrats	Irene Fawkes	543	18.7	
Liberal Democrats	Shaun Sanders	343		
Liberal Democrats	Reuven Thompson-Wood	320		
Socialist Unity	Janine Booth	260	8.9	
Conservative	Jeanette Frost	246	8.5	
Conservative	Robert Kelsey	229		
Conservative	William Ledger	205		
Socialist Unity	Charles McDonald	161		
Turnout			32.8	
Labour hold		Swing		
Labour hold		Swing		
Labour hold		Swing		

=== 2002 election ===
The election took place on 2 May 2002.

2002 Hackney London Borough Council election: Hackney Central
Party	Candidate	Votes	%	±%
Labour	Samantha Lloyd	1,327		
Labour	Alan Laing	1,149		
Labour	Vincent Stops	1,042		
Green	Simon Grover	415		
Liberal Democrats	John Bird	386		
Liberal Democrats	Derek Smith	379		
Liberal Democrats	Peter Friend	341		
Socialist Alliance	Janine Booth	271		
Conservative	Yosef Potash	127		
CPA	Zola Hargreaves	118		
Conservative	Chaim Vogel	106		
Conservative	Menachem Schtroks	103		
Turnout				
Labour win (new seat)				
Labour win (new seat)				
Labour win (new seat)				
