= Brownswood (ward) =

Ward in the London Borough of Hackney

- Electoral ward for the Hackney London Borough Council
- Brownswood ward boundaries since 2014
- Borough: Hackney
- County: Greater London
- Population: 9,013 (2021)
- Electorate: 6,573 (2022)
- Major settlements: Brownswood Park
- Area: 0.5066 square kilometres (0.1956 sq mi)

Current electoral ward
- Created: 1965
- Number of members: 2
- Councillors: Florence Schechter; Soraya Adejare
- ONS code: 00AMGA (2002–2014)
- GSS code: E05000231 (2002–2014); E05009367 (2014–present)

Brownswood is a ward in the London Borough of Hackney and forms part of the Hackney North and Stoke Newington constituency. The ward has existed since the creation of the borough on 1 April 1965 and was first used in the 1964 elections. The population of the ward in 2011 was 11,091. The boundaries of the ward from May 2014 are revised.

== Hackney council elections since 2014 ==
The ward was reduced in size for the May 2014 election with the eastern section becoming part of the new ward of Woodberry Down. The number of councillors elected for the revised Brownswood ward was reduced from three to two.

=== 2026 ===
2026 Hackney London Borough Council election: Brownswood
Party	Candidate	Votes	%	±%
Green	Soraya Adejare	1,554		
Green	Florence Schechter	1,370		
Labour	Clare Potter	1152		
Labour	Mayiata Lahai	896		
Liberal Democrats	Mark Smulian	170		
Conservative	Pearce Branigan	160		
Reform	Michelle Tabone	144		
Conservative	Weronika Wojciechowska	108		
Majority		402		
Majority		218		
Turnout		6020	45.0	
Green gain from Labour		Swing		
Green gain from Labour		Swing		

=== 2022 election ===
The election took place on 5 May 2022.

2022 Hackney London Borough Council election: Brownswood
Party	Candidate	Votes	%	±%
Labour	Soraya Adejare	1,323	63.0	
Labour	Clare Potter	1,315	62.6	
Green	Mark Douglas	553	26.3	
Green	Gitta Wigro	499	23.8	
Liberal Democrats	Andrew Neadley	232	11.1	
Conservative	Pearce Branigan	162	7.7	
Conservative	Joanna Zolnierzak	115	5.5	
Turnout			35.3	
Labour hold		Swing		
Labour hold		Swing		

=== 2018 election ===
The election took place on 3 May 2018.

2018 Hackney London Borough Council election: Brownswood
Party	Candidate	Votes	%	±%
Labour	Brian Bell	1,465	57.3	
Labour	Clare Potter	1,399	54.8	
Green	Anne Byrne	423	16.6	
Liberal Democrats	Pauline Pearce	409	16.0	
Green	Duncan Appleby	375	14.7	
Liberal Democrats	Les Kelly	303	11.9	
Conservative	Robert Kaye	199	7.8	
Conservative	Bella Weil	134	5.2	
Majority		976	38.2	
Turnout			39.4	
Labour hold		Swing		
Labour hold		Swing		

=== 2014 election ===
Returning Labour Party candidates Clare Potter and Brian Bell.

== 2002–2014 Hackney council elections ==
Brownswood ward boundaries from 2002 to 2014

There was a revision of ward boundaries in Hackney in 2002. The ward returns three councillors to the Hackney London Borough Council holding an election every four years.

=== 2010 election ===
At the previous election on 6 May 2010 Brian Bell, Feryat Demirci, and Oli de Botton; all Labour Party candidates, were returned. The turnout was 60%, with 4,637 votes cast.

== 1978–2002 Hackney council elections ==
There was a revision of ward boundaries in Hackney in 1978. The ward returned two councillors. In 2001 Brownswood ward had a total population of 11,315. This compared with the average ward population within the borough at the time of 10,674.

=== 1986 election ===
At the election on 8 May 1986 two Labour Party members were returned with a turnout of 40%.

=== 1982 election ===
For the election on 6 May 1982 the ward elected two Labour Party members, with a turnout of 34%

=== 1978 election ===
The ward elected two Labour Party members at the election on 4 May 1978 with a turnout of 34.5% and an electorate of 5,592.

== 1964–1978 Hackney council elections ==
=== 1974 election ===
The election on 2 May 1974 had a turnout of 26.6% and returned two Labour Party members. The term length was changed by the Local Government Act 1972 and the councillors were elected for a four-year term at this and all subsequent elections.

=== 1971 election ===
For 13 May 1971 election there was a turnout of 30.6% and two Labour Party members were elected. The councillors served for a three-year term.

=== 1968 election ===
At 9 May 1968 election there was a turnout of 25.9% and both councillors elected were Conservative Party members. The councillors served for a three-year term.

=== 1964 election ===
Brownswood ward has existed since the creation of the London Borough of Hackney on 1 April 1965. It was first used in the 1964 election to Hackney London Borough Council, with an electorate of 5,629, returning two councillors. On 7 May 1964 election there was a turnout of 20.1% and both councillors elected were Labour Party members. The councillors did not formally take up office until 1 April 1965, for a three-year term.

1964 Hackney London Borough Council election: Brownswood
Party	Candidate	Votes	%	±%
Labour	M. Feldman	721		
Labour	D. Bright	718		
Conservative	A. Binyon	382		
Conservative	H. Phipp	377		
Turnout		1,132	20.1	
Labour win (new seat)				
Labour win (new seat)				
