= Stamford Hill West =

Electoral ward in London, England

- Electoral ward for the Hackney London Borough Council
- Stamford Hill West ward boundaries since 2014
- Borough: Hackney
- County: Greater London
- Population: 10,344 (2021)
- Electorate: 6,485 (2022)
- Area: 0.7949 square kilometres (0.3069 sq mi)

Current electoral ward
- Created: 2014
- Number of members: 2
- Councillors: Benzion Papier; Hershy Lisser
- Created from: Lordship, New River
- GSS code: E05009384

Stamford Hill West is an electoral ward in the London Borough of Hackney. The ward was first used in the 2014 elections. It returns two councillors to Hackney London Borough Council.

== List of councillors ==
Term	Councillor	Party
2014–2018	Rosemary Sales	Labour
2014–present	Benzion Papier	Conservative
2018–2021	Aron Klein	Conservative
2021–present	Hershy Lisser	Conservative

== Hackney council elections ==
=== 2022 election ===
The election took place on 5 May 2022.

2022 Hackney London Borough Council election: Stamford Hill West
Party	Candidate	Votes	%	±%
Conservative	Hershy Lisser	1,795	59.2	
Conservative	Benzion Papier	1,782	58.8	
Labour	Ahmad Bismillah	1,105	36.5	
Labour	Faruk Tinaz	972	32.1	
Green	Johnny Dixon	170	5.6	
Green	Lewis Garland	130	4.3	
Liberal Democrats	Tony Harms	55	1.8	
Liberal Democrats	Peter Friend	52	1.7	
Majority		690		
Majority		677		
Turnout			49.2	
Conservative hold		Swing		
Conservative hold		Swing		

=== 2021 by-election ===
The by-election took place on 6 May 2021, following the resignation of Aron Klein. It was held on the same day as the 2021 London mayoral election and 2021 London Assembly election.

2021 Stamford Hill West by-election
Party	Candidate	Votes	%	±%
Conservative	Hershy Lisser	1,456	50.3	−1.4
Labour	Rosemary Sales	1,192	41.2	+1.3
Green	Johnny Dixon	189	6.5	+0.9
Liberal Democrats	Anthony Harms	59	2.0	−0.7
Majority		264	9.1	
Turnout		2,896		
Conservative hold		Swing	▼1.4	

=== 2018 election ===
The election took place on 3 May 2018.

2018 Hackney London Borough Council election: Stamford Hill West
Party	Candidate	Votes	%	±%
Conservative	Benzion Papier	1,469	49.2	
Conservative	Aron Klein	1,468	49.2	
Labour	Simon Dixon	1,133	38.0	
Labour	Rosemary Sales	1,013	34.0	
Green	Bronwen Jones	160	5.4	
Green	Charles Dreyer	155	5.2	
Liberal Democrats	Anthony Harms	78	2.6	
Liberal Democrats	Andrew Neadley	50	1.7	
Majority				
Turnout			49.5	
Conservative gain from Labour		Swing		
Conservative hold		Swing		

=== 2014 election ===
The election took place on 22 May 2014.

2014 Hackney London Borough Council election: Stamford Hill West
Party	Candidate	Votes	%	±%
Majority				
Turnout				
	Labour win (new seat)			
	Conservative win (new seat)			
