= Hackney Wick (ward) =

Electoral ward in London, England

- Electoral ward for the Hackney London Borough Council
- Hackney Wick ward boundaries since 2014
- Borough: Hackney
- County: Greater London
- Population: 12,308 (2021)
- Electorate: 9,125 (2022)
- Major settlements: Hackney Wick
- Area: 1.633 square kilometres (0.631 sq mi)

Current electoral ward
- Created: 2014
- Number of members: 3
- Councillors: Jess Webb; Nick Sharman; Joseph Ogundemuren
- Created from: Victoria, Wick
- GSS code: E05009374

Hackney Wick is an electoral ward in the London Borough of Hackney. The ward was first used in the 2014 elections. It returns three councillors to Hackney London Borough Council.

== List of councillors ==
Term	Councillor	Party
2014–present	Chris Kennedy	Labour
2014–present	Jess Webb	Labour
2014–2022	Nick Sharman	Labour
2022–present	Joseph Ogundemuren	Labour

== Hackney council elections ==
=== 2022 election ===
The election took place on 5 May 2022.

2022 Hackney London Borough Council election: Hackney Wick
Party	Candidate	Votes	%	±%
Labour	Jessica Webb	1,729	72.8	
Labour	Chris Kennedy	1,675	70.5	
Labour	Joseph Ogundemuren	1,603	67.5	
Green	Laura Salisbury	654	27.5	
Green	Clive Ardagh	439	18.5	
Green	Stuart Coggins	407	17.1	
Conservative	Anna Socha	190	8.0	
Conservative	Piotr Lipinski	185	7.8	
Conservative	Piotr Pietrzyk	172	7.2	
Independent	Vernon Williams	70	2.9	
Turnout			30.0	
Labour hold		Swing		
Labour hold		Swing		
Labour hold		Swing		

=== 2018 election ===
The election took place on 3 May 2018.

2018 Hackney London Borough Council election: Hackney Wick
Party	Candidate	Votes	%	±%
Labour	Chris Kennedy	1,941	71.7	
Labour	Jessica Webb	1,756	64.9	
Labour	Nick Sharman	1,612	59.6	
Green	Joe Garbett	390	14.4	
Green	Laura Salisbury	390	14.4	
Green	Ruth Sharpe	343	12.7	
Liberal Democrats	Andreea Deac	176	6.5	
Conservative	Thomas Stancliffe	153	5.7	
Conservative	Marzena Kwasnik	148	5.5	
Liberal Democrats	James Lyons	148	5.5	
Conservative	Yehoshua Heschel Bernstein	137	5.1	
Liberal Democrats	Ken Rolph	124	4.6	
Majority				
Turnout			31.2	
Labour hold		Swing		
Labour hold		Swing		
Labour hold		Swing		

=== 2014 election ===
The election took place on 22 May 2014.

2014 Hackney London Borough Council election: Hackney Wick
Party	Candidate	Votes	%	±%
Majority				
Turnout				
	Labour win (new seat)			
	Labour win (new seat)			
	Labour win (new seat)			
