= Sem Moema =

British politician (born 1984)

Sem Moema AM
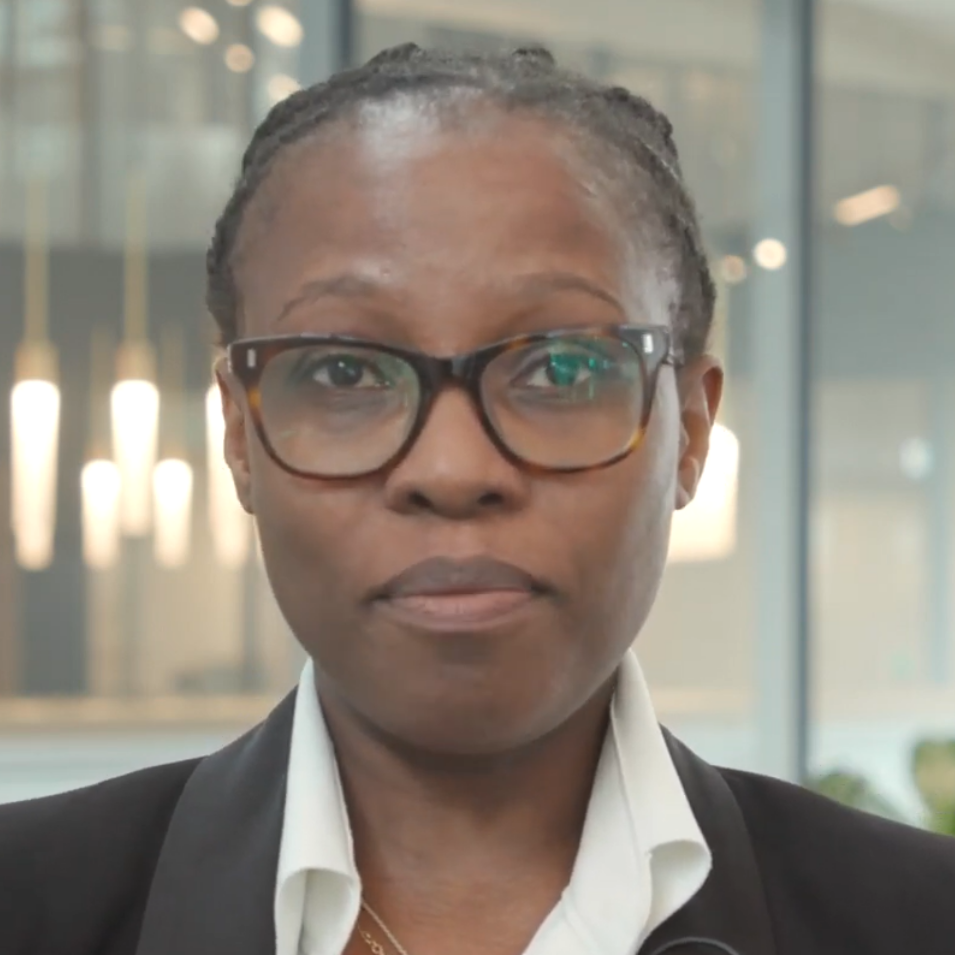
- Moema in 2025

Member of the London Assembly for North East
- Incumbent
- Assumed office 8 May 2021
- Preceded by: Jennette Arnold
- Majority: 59,746 (28.8%)

Hackney London Borough Councillor for Hackney Downs
- Incumbent
- Assumed office 3 May 2018

Personal details
- Born: Semakaleng Mokgadi Moema; 4 November 1984 (age 41) Islington, London, England
- Party: Labour
- Education: Keele University; Birkbeck, University of London
- Website: www.semmoema.london

Semakaleng Mokgadi Moema (born 4 November 1984) is a British Labour Party politician who has been the London Assembly Member for North East since 2021.

== Early life ==
Moema was born in Islington to South African parents who had fled Apartheid in the 1970s. She attended St Michael's Catholic Grammar School and Mahindra United World College. She graduated with a Bachelor of Arts from Keele University and a Master of Science in Public Policy and Management from Birkbeck, University of London.

== Political career ==
She was first elected as a councillor on Hackney Council for Hackney Downs ward in 2006. She did not stand for re-election in the 2010 local government elections but returned to Hackney Council in a by-election 2016, again representing Hackney Downs ward. Moema was re-elected in the 2018 Hackney London Borough Council election and in the 2022 Hackney Borough Council election.

Moema is a mayoral adviser for private rented sector and housing affordability on Hackney Council, in which role she introduced a licensing scheme for privately rented housing in Hackney.

Following her election to the London Assembly in May 2021 she was elected to serve on the Assembly's Housing, Police and Crime and Confirmation Hearings Committees. Moema is also the chair of the London Assembly's housing committee.

Moema has campaigned on London's housing crisis, campaigning for a lift in Local Housing Allowance following rising rents in the Capital. This campaign was successful, with the Government enacting her ask at the next Autumn Statement.

She has successfully campaigned against Section 21 "no fault" evictions, with the Labour Government formed following the 2024 General Election including a ban in their first King's Speech.
