= New River (ward) =

Electoral ward in the London Borough of Hackney

- Former electoral ward for the Hackney London Borough Council
- New River ward boundaries from 2002 to 2014
- Borough: Hackney
- County: Greater London
- Population: 12,551 (2011)
- Electorate: 7,016 (2010)
- Area: 1.213 square kilometres (0.468 sq mi)

Former electoral ward
- Created: 1965
- Abolished: 2014
- Councillors: 3
- Replaced by: Springfield, Stamford Hill West, Woodberry Down
- ONS code: 00AMGP (2002–2014)
- GSS code: E05000244 (2002–2014)

New River was a ward in the London Borough of Hackney and forms part of the Hackney North and Stoke Newington constituency. Consisting of an area of Stamford Hill the ward also incorporated the large council estate of Woodberry Down. The ward took its name from the New River, built to supply London with drinking water in the early 17th century.

The ward returned three councillors to the Hackney London Borough Council, with elections every four years. At the previous election on 6 May 2010 Maureen Middleton (Conservative Party); and Labour Party candidates Michael Jones and Sean Mulready were returned. Turnout was 56%; with 3,956 votes cast.

In 2011 New River ward had a total population of 12,551. This compared with the average ward population within the borough of 12,962.

== 2002–2014 Hackney council elections ==
There was a revision of ward boundaries in Hackney in 2002.

== 1978–2002 Hackney council elections ==
There was a revision of ward boundaries in Hackney in 1978.
