= Homerton (ward) =

Electoral ward in London, England

- Electoral ward for the Hackney London Borough Council
- Homerton ward boundaries since 2014
- Borough: Hackney
- County: Greater London
- Population: 13,884 (2021)
- Electorate: 9,054 (2022)
- Area: 0.8316 square kilometres (0.3211 sq mi)

Current electoral ward
- Created: 1978–2002 (first creation); 2014–present (second creation)
- Number of members: 1978–2002: 2; 2014–present: 3
- Councillors: Robert Chapman; Guy Nicholson; Anna Lynch
- GSS code: E05009376

Homerton is an electoral ward in the London Borough of Hackney. The ward was originally created in 1978 with two councillors and abolished in 2002. It was created again in 2014, returning three councillors to Hackney London Borough Council.

== List of councillors ==
Term	Councillor	Party
2014–present	Robert Chapman	Labour
2014–present	Guy Nicholson	Labour
2014–2018	Sally Mulready	Labour
2018–present	Anna Lynch	Labour

== Hackney council elections ==
=== 2022 election ===
The election took place on 5 May 2022.

2022 Hackney London Borough Council election: Homerton
Party	Candidate	Votes	%	±%
Labour	Anna Lynch	1,922	78.4	
Labour	Robert Chapman	1,720	70.2	
Labour	Guy Nicholson	1,616	66.0	
Green	Brenda Puech	700	28.6	
Green	Benjamin Newman	623	25.4	
Green	Thomas Richardson	503	20.5	
Conservative	Milton Morris	267	10.9	
Turnout			31.0	
Labour hold		Swing		
Labour hold		Swing		
Labour hold		Swing		

=== 2018 election ===
The election took place on 3 May 2018.

2018 Hackney London Borough Council election: Homerton
Party	Candidate	Votes	%	±%
Labour	Robert Chapman	2,243	73.2	
Labour	Anna Lynch	2,147	70.0	
Labour	Guy Nicholson	1,982	64.6	
Green	Rachel Baker	587	19.1	
Green	Tamlyn Rhodes	361	11.8	
Green	John Devaney	326	10.6	
Conservative	Milton Morris	163	5.3	
Conservative	Samson Adeyemo	159	5.2	
Conservative	Edilia Emordi	144	4.7	
Liberal Democrats	Neil Jacobson	144	4.7	
Liberal Democrats	Jeffery Shenker	119	3.9	
Liberal Democrats	Mark Smulian	78	2.5	
Majority				
Turnout			34.2	
Labour hold		Swing		
Labour hold		Swing		
Labour hold		Swing		

=== 2014 election ===
The election took place on 22 May 2014.

2014 Hackney London Borough Council election: Homerton
Party	Candidate	Votes	%	±%
Labour	Robert Chapman	2,120	65.8	
Labour	Guy Nicholson	2,029	63.0	
Labour	Sally Mulready	1,993	61.9	
Green	Kevin Clark	548	17.0	
Green	John Devaney	527	16.4	
Green	Virginia Calvo	507	15.7	
Conservative	Stephen Selby	231	7.2	
Liberal Democrats	Melissa Harflett	216	6.7	
Conservative	Oluwagbemiro Igunnubole	201	6.2	
Independent	Shuruj Miah	194	6.0	
Conservative	Alina Nowobilski	187	5.8	
Liberal Democrats	Charlie Harris	183	5.7	
Liberal Democrats	Susan Horowitz	126	3.9	
Majority		1,445		
Turnout		3,222	37.5	
Labour win (new seat)				
Labour win (new seat)				
Labour win (new seat)				
