= Woodberry Down (ward) =

Electoral ward in London, England

- Electoral ward for the Hackney London Borough Council
- Woodberry Down ward boundaries since 2014
- Borough: Hackney
- County: Greater London
- Population: 12,113 (2021)
- Electorate: 7,649 (2022)
- Area: 0.7527 square kilometres (0.2906 sq mi)

Current electoral ward
- Created: 2014
- Number of members: 2
- Councillors: Caroline Selman; Sarah Young
- Created from: Brownswood, New River
- GSS code: E05009387

Woodberry Down is an electoral ward in the London Borough of Hackney. The ward was first used in the 2014 elections. It returns two councillors to Hackney London Borough Council.

== List of councillors ==
Term	Councillor	Party
2014–2021	Jon Burke	Labour
2014–present	Caroline Selman	Labour
2021–present	Sarah Young	Labour

== Hackney council elections ==
=== 2022 election ===
The election took place on 5 May 2022.

2022 Hackney London Borough Council election: Woodberry Down
Party	Candidate	Votes	%	±%
Labour	Caroline Selman	1,441	71.4	
Labour	Sarah Young	1,189	58.9	
Green	Catherine O'Shea	452	22.4	
Green	Anthony Rose	438	21.7	
Conservative	Yisroel Cik	276	13.7	
Conservative	Agnieszka Wypych	238	11.8	
Turnout			30.0	
Labour hold		Swing		
Labour hold		Swing		

=== 2021 by-election ===
The by-election took place on 6 May 2021, following the resignation of Jon Burke. It was held on the same day as the 2021 London mayoral election and 2021 London Assembly election.

2021 Woodberry Down by-election
Party	Candidate	Votes	%	±%
Labour	Sarah Young	1,680	57.7	−13.9
Green	Alice Bennett	535	18.4	+7.2
Conservative	Ari Feferkorn	530	18.2	+8.3
Liberal Democrats	Alton Hassan	167	5.7	−1.6
Majority		1,145	39.3	
Turnout		2,912		
Labour hold		Swing	▼10.6	

=== 2018 election ===
The election took place on 3 May 2018.

2018 Hackney London Borough Council election: Woodberry Down
Party	Candidate	Votes	%	±%
Labour	Jon Burke	1,668	68.2	
Labour	Caroline Selman	1,508	61.7	
Green	James Pike	260	10.6	
Green	Daniel Alexander	252	10.3	
Conservative	Debbie Seepersad	231	9.5	
Liberal Democrats	Carol Chan	170	7.0	
Conservative	Christopher Sills	151	6.2	
Liberal Democrats	Myall Hornsby	123	5.0	
Majority				
Turnout			34.8	
Labour hold		Swing		
Labour hold		Swing		

=== 2014 election ===
The election took place on 22 May 2014.

2014 Hackney London Borough Council election: Woodberry Down
Party	Candidate	Votes	%	±%
Majority				
Turnout				
	Labour win (new seat)			
	Labour win (new seat)			
	Labour win (new seat)			
