= North East (London Assembly constituency) =

- Territorial constituency for the London Assembly
- North East shown within London
- Created: 2000
- Number of members: One
- Member: Sem Moema
- Party: Labour Co-op
- Last election: 2024
- Next election: 2028

North East is a constituency of the London Assembly. It is represented by Sem Moema, of the Labour Party.

It encompasses the London Boroughs of Hackney, Islington and Waltham Forest.

== Assembly members ==
Election	Member	Party
2000	Meg Hillier	Labour
2004	Jennette Arnold	Labour
2021	Sem Moema	Labour

== Assembly election results ==
=== 2020s ===
2024 London Assembly election: North East
Party	Candidate	Constituency			List		
Party	Candidate	Votes	%	±%	Votes	%	±%
Labour	Sem Moema	104,088	50.2	▼1.0	105,270	51.1	▲3.0
Green	Antoinette Fernandez	44,342	21.4	▲1.6	39,046	18.9	▲1.9
Conservative	Pearce Branigan	27,769	13.4	▼5.4	26,162	12.7	▼4.1
Liberal Democrats	Rebecca Jones	12,920	6.2	▼0.5	10,828	5.3	▲0.2
Reform	Tony Glover	9,086	4.4	▲2.5	7,187	3.5	▲2.8
TUSC	Nancy Taaffe	5,595	2.7	▲1.2			
Rejoin EU					5,113	2.5	New
Animal Welfare					3,251	1.6	0.0
SDP					1,877	0.9	▲0.6
Independent	Tan Bui	1,804	0.9	New			
Britain First					1,803	0.9	New
CPA					1,761	0.9	0.0
Communist					1,322	0.6	▲0.1
Independent	Farah London				1,190	0.6	New
Independent	Laurence Fox				846	0.4	New
Heritage					291	0.1	▼0.4
Independent	Gabe Romualdo				143	0.1	New
Majority		59,746	28.8	▼2.6			
Valid votes		205,604			206,090		
Invalid votes		1,891			1,485		
Turnout		207,495	39.5		207,575	39.5	
Labour hold		Swing		▼1.3			

2021 London Assembly election: North East
Party	Candidate	Constituency			List		
Party	Candidate	Votes	%	±%	Votes	%	±%
Labour Co-op	Sem Moema	112,739	51.2	-7.5	105,520	48.1	
Green	Caroline Russell (Note: Incumbent member on the party list, or for another constituency)	43,601	19.8	+7.0	37,353	17.0	
Conservative	Emma Best	41,398	18.8	+4.6	36,853	16.8	
Liberal Democrats	Kate Pothalingham	14,827	6.7	+0.4	11,091	5.1	
Women's Equality					7,849	3.6	New
Animal Welfare					3,493	1.6	New
CPA					1,958	0.9	New
UKIP					1,683	0.8	New
London Real					1,630	0.7	New
Reform	Alex Wilson	4,251	1.9	New	1,614	0.7	
TUSC	Nancy Taaffe	3,236	1.5	New	1,559	0.7	
Let London Live					1,455	0.7	New
Heritage					1,062	0.5	New
Communist					1,006	0.5	New
SDP					667	0.3	New
Londependence					608	0.3	New
National Liberal					199	0.1	New
Majority		69,138	31.4	-13.1			
Valid votes		220,052			219,250		
Invalid votes		3.555			4,556		
Turnout		223,607	42.3	-3.7	223,786	42.3	-3.7
Labour win (new seat)							

=== 2010s ===
2016 London Assembly election: North East
Party	Candidate	Votes	%	±%
Labour	Jennette Arnold	134,307	58.7	+5.6
Conservative	Sam Malik	32,565	14.2	−4.4
Green	Samir Jeraj	29,401	12.8	−2.7
Liberal Democrats	Terry Stacy	14,312	6.3	−0.6
UKIP	Freddy Vachha	11,315	5.0	+1.6
Respect	Tim Allen	5,068	2.2	New
Socialist (GB)	Bill Martin	1,293	0.6	New
Communist League	Jonathan Silberman	536	0.2	New
Majority		101,742	44.5	+10.0
Total formal votes		228,797	98.8	+0.5
Informal votes		2,734	1.2	−0.5
Turnout		231,531	46.0	+6.9
Labour hold		Swing		

2012 London Assembly election: North East
Party	Candidate	Votes	%	±%
Labour	Jennette Arnold	101,902	53.1	+15.1
Conservative	Naomi Newstead	35,714	18.6	−4.7
Green	Caroline Allen	29,677	15.5	+2.1
Liberal Democrats	Farooq Qureshi	13,237	6.9	−8.1
UKIP	Paul Wiffen	6,623	3.4	+0.7
Independent	Ijaz Hayat	4,842	2.5	+2.5
Majority		66,188	34.5	+19.4
Total formal votes		191,995	98.3	+0.4
Informal votes		3,326	1.7	−0.4
Turnout		195,321	39.1	−4.7
Labour hold		Swing		

2008 London Assembly election: North East
Party	Candidate	Votes	%	±%
Labour	Jennette Arnold	73,551	37.2	+8.2
Conservative	Alexander Ellis	45,114	22.8	+4.7
Liberal Democrats	Meral Ece	28,973	14.6	–4.1
Green	Aled Fisher	25,845	13.1	+0.1
Left List	Unjum Mirza	6,019	3.0	New
UKIP	Nicholas Jones	5,349	2.7	–6.2
Christian (CPA)	Maxine Hargreaves	5,323	2.7	New
English Democrat	John Dodds	3,637	1.8	New
Majority		28,437	14.4	+4.1
Total formal votes		193,811	97.9	
Informal votes		4,082	2.1	
Turnout		197,893	43.8	+12.5
Labour hold		Swing		

2004 London Assembly election: North East
Party	Candidate	Votes	%	±%
Labour	Jennette Arnold	37,380	29.0	–7.1
Liberal Democrats	Terry Stacy	24,042	18.7	–2.4
Conservative	Andrew Boff	23,264	18.1	0.0
Green	Jon Nott	16,739	13.0	–2.6
UKIP	R. J. Selby	11,459	8.9	New
Respect	D. R. E. Ryan	11,184	8.7	New
CPA	A. A. Otchie	3,219	2.5	New
Communist	J. I. Beavis	1,378	1.1	New
Majority		13,338	10.3	−4.7
Total formal votes		128,665	31.3	+2.6
Turnout		128,665		
Labour hold		Swing		

2000 London Assembly election: North East
Party	Candidate	Votes	%	±%
Labour	Meg Hillier	42,459	36.1	N/A
Liberal Democrats	Paul Fox	24,856	21.1	N/A
Conservative	Eric Ollerenshaw	20,975	18.1	N/A
Green	Yen Chit Chong	18,382	15.6	N/A
London Socialist	Cecelia Prosper	8,269	7.0	N/A
Independent	Paul Shaer	1,501	1.3	N/A
Reform 2000	Erol Basarik	1,144	1.0	N/A
Majority		17,603	15.0	N/A
Total formal votes		117,586	28.7	N/A
Turnout		117,586		
Labour win (new seat)				

== Mayoral election results ==
Below are the results for the candidate which received the highest share of the popular vote in the constituency at each mayoral election.

Year	Party	Candidate
2000	Independent	Ken Livingstone
2004	Labour	Ken Livingstone
2008	Labour	Ken Livingstone
2012	Labour	Ken Livingstone
2016	Labour	Sadiq Khan
2021	Labour	Sadiq Khan
2024	Labour	Sadiq Khan

2024 London mayoral election (North East)
Party	Candidate	Votes	%	±%
Labour	Sadiq Khan	127,455	61.7	N/A
Conservative	Susan Hall	34,099	16.5	N/A
Green	Zoë Garbett	17,907	8.66	N/A
Liberal Democrats	Rob Blackie	7,399	3.58	N/A
Reform	Howard Cox	4,485	2.17	N/A
Independent	Natalie Campbell	3,804	1.84	N/A
SDP	Amy Gallagher	2,423	1.17	N/A
Animal Welfare	Femy Amin	2,134	1.03	N/A
Independent	Andreas Michli	2,087	1.01	N/A
Count Binface for Mayor of London	Count Binface	1,929	0.933	N/A
Britain First	Nick Scanlon	1095	0.53	N/A
London Real	Brian Rose	955	0.462	N/A
Independent	Tarun Ghulati	922	0.446	N/A
Turnout		207,722	39.6%	−2.72%
Rejected ballots		1028		
Registered electors		524,885		+0.821%

2021 London mayoral election (North East)
Party	Candidate	1st round		2nd round			1st round votesTransfer votes, 2nd round
Party	Candidate	Total	Of round	Transfers	Total	Of round	1st round votesTransfer votes, 2nd round
Labour	Sadiq Khan	111,359	52%				
Conservative	Shaun Bailey	44,233	20.7%				
Green	Siân Berry	24,257	11.3%				
Liberal Democrats	Luisa Porritt	6,931	3.24%				
Independent	Niko Omilana	4,137	1.93%				
Reclaim	Laurence Fox	3,147	1.47%				
Women's Equality	Mandu Reid	2,784	1.3%				
London Real	Brian Rose	2,715	1.27%				
Count Binface for Mayor of London	Count Binface	2,576	1.2%				
Let London Live	Piers Corbyn	2,332	1.09%				
Rejoin EU	Richard Hewison	1,948	0.91%				
Independent	Farah London	1,545	0.722%				
Animal Welfare	Vanessa Hudson	1,311	0.613%				
Heritage	David Kurten	839	0.392%				
Independent	Nims Obunge	831	0.388%				
UKIP	Peter John Gammons	808	0.378%				
SDP	Steve Kelleher	696	0.325%				
Burning Pink	Valerie Brown	575	0.269%				
Renew	Kam Balayev	570	0.266%				
Independent	Max Fosh	440	0.206%				
Turnout		223,834	42.3%				
Registered electors		529,229					

2016 London mayoral election (North East)
Party	Candidate	1st round		2nd round			1st round votesTransfer votes, 2nd round
Party	Candidate	Total	Of round	Transfers	Total	Of round	1st round votesTransfer votes, 2nd round
Labour	Sadiq Khan	136,848	60.1%				
Conservative	Zac Goldsmith	40,341	17.7%				
Green	Siân Berry	20,014	8.79%				
Liberal Democrats	Caroline Pidgeon	8,576	3.77%				
Women's Equality	Sophie Walker	6,499	2.85%				
UKIP	Peter Whittle	5,384	2.36%				
Respect	George Galloway	3,772	1.66%				
Britain First	Paul Golding	2,090	0.918%				
Cannabis is Safer than Alcohol	Lee Eli Harris	1,968	0.864%				
Independent	Prince Zylinski	910	0.4%				
BNP	David Furness	899	0.395%				
One Love	Ankit Love	373	0.164%				
Turnout		231,531	46.1%				
Registered electors		501,906					

2012 London mayoral election (North East)
Party	Candidate	1st round		2nd round			1st round votesTransfer votes, 2nd round
Party	Candidate	Total	Of round	Transfers	Total	Of round	1st round votesTransfer votes, 2nd round
Labour	Ken Livingstone	102,934	53.5%				
Conservative	Boris Johnson	54,302	28.2%				
Green	Jenny Jones	14,498	7.53%				
Liberal Democrats	Brian Paddick	8,462	4.4%				
Independent	Siobhan Benita	7,723	4.01%				
UKIP	Lawrence Webb	2,634	1.37%				
BNP	Carlos Cortiglia	1,887	0.981%				
Turnout		195,847	39.2%				
Registered electors		499,418					

2008 London mayoral election (North East)
Party	Candidate	1st round		2nd round			1st round votesTransfer votes, 2nd round
Party	Candidate	Total	Of round	Transfers	Total	Of round	1st round votesTransfer votes, 2nd round
Labour	Ken Livingstone	96,402	49.4%				
Conservative	Boris Johnson	57,394	29.4%				
Liberal Democrats	Brian Paddick	19,641	10.1%				
Green	Siân Berry	9,790	5.02%				
BNP	Richard Barnbrook	3,776	1.94%				
Christian Choice	Alan Craig	3,067	1.57%				
Left List	Lindsey German	2,310	1.18%				
UKIP	Gerard Batten	1,396	0.716%				
English Democrat	Matt O'Connor	820	0.42%				
Independent	Winston McKenzie	482	0.247%				
Turnout		198,349	43.9%				
Registered electors		451,787					

2004 London mayoral election (North East)
Party	Candidate	1st round		2nd round			1st round votesTransfer votes, 2nd round
Party	Candidate	Total	Of round	Transfers	Total	Of round	1st round votesTransfer votes, 2nd round
Labour	Ken Livingstone	60,988	45.2%				
Conservative	Steve Norris	26,415	19.6%				
Liberal Democrats	Simon Hughes	18,635	13.8%				
Respect	Lindsey German	8,149	6.04%				
UKIP	Frank Maloney	6,777	5.02%				
Green	Darren Johnson	6,094	4.52%				
BNP	Julian Leppert	3,531	2.62%				
CPA	Ram Gidoomal	2,894	2.14%				
Independent Working Class Action	Lorna Reid	1,103	0.817%				
Independent	Tammy Nagalingam	345	0.256%				
Turnout		139,306	33.9%				
Registered electors		410,719					

2000 London mayoral election (North East)
Party	Candidate	1st round		2nd round			1st round votesTransfer votes, 2nd round
Party	Candidate	Total	Of round	Transfers	Total	Of round	1st round votesTransfer votes, 2nd round
Independent	Ken Livingstone	63,333	48%				
Conservative	Steve Norris	21,676	16.4%				
Labour	Frank Dobson	20,075	15.2%				
Liberal Democrats	Susan Kramer	14,731	11.2%				
Green	Darren Johnson	4,253	3.22%				
CPA	Ram Gidoomal	2,791	2.11%				
BNP	Michael Newland	2,454	1.86%				
UKIP	Damian Hockney	986	0.747%				
Pro-Motorist Small Shop	Geoffrey Ben-Nathan	720	0.546%				
Natural Law	Geoffrey Clements	494	0.374%				
Independent	Ashwin Kumar	463	0.351%				
Turnout		135,372	33.1%				
Registered electors		409,172					
