= 2022 Hackney London Borough Council election =

2022 local election in Hackney

2022 Hackney Council election
- 5 May 2022

All 57 council seats and Mayor of Hackney
- Turnout: 34.06%
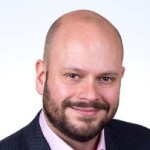

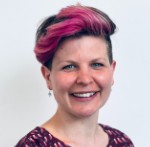
	First party	Second party	Third party
Leader	Philip Glanville	Oliver Hall	Zoë Garbett
Party	Labour	Conservative	Green
Last election	52 seats, 63.0%, and Mayor	5 seats, 11.1%	0 seats, 16.9%
Seats won	50, and Mayor	5	2
Seat change	▼2	0	▲2
Popular vote	90,574	16,173	35,419
Percentage	58.9%	10.5%	23.0%
Swing	▼4.1%	▼0.6%	▲6.1%
Mayoral votes	36,049, 59%	8,160, 13%	10,373, 17%
- Results by Ward. Red for Labour, Green for the Greens and Blue for the Conservatives.
Council control before election
Labour
Labour
Subsequent council control
Labour
Labour

The 2022 Hackney London Borough Council election took place on 5 May 2022. All 57 members of Hackney London Borough Council were up for election. The elections took place alongside the election for the mayor of Hackney, local elections in the other London boroughs, and elections to local authorities across the United Kingdom.

The Labour Party retained overall control of the council. It won 50 of the 57 seats, losing two seats to the Green Party. The Conservative Party held the five seats that they had had before the election, remaining the official opposition.

== Background ==
=== History ===
Result of the 2018 borough election

The thirty-two London boroughs were established in 1965 by the London Government Act 1963. They are the principal authorities in Greater London and have responsibilities including education, housing, planning, highways, social services, libraries, recreation, waste, environmental health and revenue collection. Some of the powers are shared with the Greater London Authority, which also manages passenger transport, police and fire.

Since its formation, Hackney has usually been under Labour control except for a period from 1968 to 1971 when it was under Conservative control and from 1998 to 2002 when it was under no overall control. Councillors have mostly been elected from the Labour Party, Conservative Party and Liberal Democrats, with some Green Party councillors being elected in 1998 and 2006. In the most recent election in 2018, the Liberal Democrats lost their three seats in the Cazenove ward with Labour winning 52 seats with 63.0% of the vote across the borough and the Conservatives winning the remaining 5 seats with 11.1% of the vote across the borough. The Green Party won 16.9% of the vote across the borough without winning any seats, performing best in the Dalston and Hackney Downs wards. The Liberal Democrats won 8.6% of the vote without winning any seats, performing best in Cazenove ward. The council is run under a mayoral system, so its leader is the directly elected mayor of Hackney. The incumbent mayor of Hackney was Labour's Philip Glanville, who had held that role since a 2016 by-election.

The local Conservative Party in Hackney selected Oliver Hall as their candidate for Mayor. At nineteen years old, he was thought to have been the youngest ever major-party candidate for a directly elected mayoralty in England and Wales.

=== Council term ===
A Labour councillor for Victoria ward, Alex Kuye, resigned in September 2018 for health reasons. A by-election to replace him was held in October 2018, which was won by the Labour candidate Penny Wrout with 58% of the vote against a swing to the Liberal Democrats. Wrout taught journalism at the University of Essex. In November 2019, a Labour councillor for Clissold ward, Ned Hercock, resigned for personal reasons. A by-election was held on 12 December 2019 on the same date as the 2019 general election, which was won by the Labour candidate Kofo David. David was an activist training to be a barrister. His selection as the Labour candidate was criticised by opposing candidates who pointed to his unsuccessful court action against a former colleague who had accused him of sexual harassment and bullying.

Feryal Clark, a Labour councillor for Hoxton East and Shoreditch, resigned after being elected as Member of Parliament (MP) for Enfield North. A Labour councillor for King's Park, Tom Rahilly, resigned in March 2020 due to taking a politically restricted job. A Conservative councillor for Stamford Hill West, Aron Klein, resigned in July 2020 due to ill health. Jon Burke, a Labour councillor for Woodberry Down, resigned in January 2021 due to plans to move out of London. Due to the COVID-19 pandemic, all four by-elections were not held until May 2021 alongside the 2021 London mayoral election and London Assembly election. The candidates for the incumbent party won in all four seats. The Labour candidate Anya Sizer won in Hoxton East and Shoreditch, with the Green Party coming second. The Labour candidate Lynne Troughton won in King's Park, with the Greens again coming second. The Conservative candidate Stephen Lisser won the Stamford Hill West by-election, with Labour coming a closer second. The Labour candidate Sarah Young won the Woodberry Down by-election with the Green Party coming in second place.

Unlike most London boroughs, Hackney kept its existing ward boundaries, as they were last reviewed in 2013.

== Electoral process ==
Hackney, like other London borough councils, elects all of its councillors at once every four years. The previous election took place in 2018. The election took place by multi-member first-past-the-post voting, with each ward being represented by two or three councillors. Electors had as many votes as there were councillors to be elected in their ward, with the top two or three being elected.

All registered electors (British, Irish, Commonwealth and European Union citizens) living in London aged 18 or over were entitled to vote in the election. People who lived at two addresses in different councils, such as university students with different term-time and holiday addresses, were entitled to be registered for and vote in elections in both local authorities. Voting in-person at polling stations took place from 7:00 to 22:00 on election day, and voters were able to apply for postal votes or proxy votes in advance of the election.

== Campaign ==
=== Mayoral election ===
The Conservatives selected the nineteen-year-old law student, Oliver Hall, as their mayoral candidate. Hall said he would stop any new Low Traffic Neighbourhood schemes and consult on removing existing ones. He also promised to build more affordable housing. Gwenton Sloley, an anti-gang activist, stood as an independent candidate under the slogan "Hackney People Before Profit". He said that the proceeds of the crime fund should be spent on "talking therapy and drop-in services" to "help people whose mental health has deteriorated during successive lockdowns". He said he would work to stop children from being excluded from school, and provide mentoring to young people after they are arrested, to prevent them from getting involved in gangs and criminal activity.

== Previous council composition ==
Council composition after the 2018 election

Council composition ahead of the 2022 election

After 2018 election		Before 2022 election	
Party	Seats	Party	Seats
Labour	52	Labour	52
Conservative	5	Conservative	5

== Results summary ==
=== Mayoral election ===
Mayor of Hackney
Party	Candidate	Votes	%	±%
Labour Co-op	Philip Glanville	36,049	59	
Green	Zoë Garbett	10,373	17	
Conservative	Oliver Hall	8,160	13	
Liberal Democrats	Helen Baxter	4,320	7	
Hackney People Before Profit	Gwenton Sloley	2,105	3	
Majority		25,676	42.1	
Rejected ballots		1,036	1.7	
Turnout		62,043	34.06	
Registered electors		182,136		
Labour hold		Swing		

=== Council election ===
Hackney Council election result 2022
Party	Seats	Gains	Losses	Net gain/loss	Seats %	Votes %	Votes	+/−
Labour	50	0	2	-2	87.7	58.9	90,574	-4.1
Green	2	2	0	+2	3.5	23.0	35,419	+6.1
Conservative	5	0	0	0	8.8	10.5	16,173	-0.6
Liberal Democrats	0	0	0	0	0.0	5.5	8,455	-3.1
Ind. Network	0	0	0	0	0.0	1.2	1,912	New
TUSC	0	0	0	0	0.0	0.5	694	+0.4
Women's Equality	0	0	0	0	0.0	0.3	489	+0.1
Independent	0	0	0	0	0.0	0.0	70	0.0

== Ward results ==
Asterisks (*) denote sitting councillors

=== Brownswood ===
Brownswood (2)
Party	Candidate	Votes	%	±%
Labour	Soraya Adejare	1,323	63.0	
Labour	Clare Potter*	1,315	62.6	
Green	Mark Douglas	553	26.3	
Green	Gitta Wigro	499	23.8	
Liberal Democrats	Andrew Neadley	232	11.1	
Conservative	Pearce Branigan	162	7.7	
Conservative	Joanna Zolnierzak	115	5.5	
Majority		770	36.7	
Majority		762	36.3	
Turnout		2,320	35.30	
Rejected ballots		22	0.9	
Registered electors		6,573		
Labour hold		Swing		
Labour hold		Swing		

=== Cazenove ===
Cazenove (3)
Party	Candidate	Votes	%	±%
Labour	Caroline Woodley*	1,724	50.0	
Labour	Eluzer Goldberg	1,709	49.6	
Labour	Sam Pallis*	1,582	45.9	
Liberal Democrats	Ian Sharer	1,471	42.7	
Liberal Democrats	Javed Isrolia	1,233	35.8	
Liberal Democrats	Darren Martin	1,121	32.5	
Green	Maria Garcia	463	13.4	
Green	Daniel Alexander	433	12.6	
Green	Stephen Fielder	277	8.0	
Conservative	Rishiduth Bootna	251	7.3	
TUSC	Naomi Byron	81	2.3	
Majority		253	7.3	
Majority		238	6.9	
Majority		111	3.2	
Turnout		3,669	39.22	
Rejected ballots		18	0.5	
Registered electors		9,354		
Labour hold		Swing		
Labour hold		Swing		
Labour hold		Swing		

=== Clissold ===
Clissold (3)
Party	Candidate	Votes	%	±%
Labour	Sade Etti*	2,188	65.9	
Labour	Frank Baffour	1,869	56.3	
Labour	Fliss Premru	1,740	52.4	
Green	Feodora Rayner	1,120	33.7	
Green	Marie Remy	793	23.9	
Green	Reiner Tegtmeyer	564	17.0	
Women's Equality	Tabitha Morton	489	14.7	
Liberal Democrats	Heather James	392	11.8	
Conservative	Diana Mikolajewska	232	7.0	
Ind. Network	Kelly Reid	220	6.6	
Conservative	Monika Nierzejewski	181	5.4	
Conservative	Julia Zolnierzak	179	5.4	
Majority		1,068	32.1	
Majority		749	22.5	
Majority		620	18.7	
Turnout		3,589	38.06	
Rejected ballots		19	0.5	
Registered electors		9,430		
Labour hold		Swing		
Labour hold		Swing		
Labour hold		Swing		

=== Dalston ===
Dalston (2)
Party	Candidate	Votes	%	±%
Green	Zoë Garbett	1,446	62.8	
Labour	Grace Adebayo	1,199	52.1	
Green	Tyrone Scott	920	39.9	
Labour	Peter Snell*	727	31.6	
Liberal Democrats	Alton Hassan	138	6.0	
Ind. Network	Olu Adesanu	89	3.9	
Ind. Network	Esther Petrou	87	3.8	
Majority		526	22.8	
Majority		179	7.8	
Turnout		2,591	37.77	
Rejected ballots		26	1.0	
Registered electors		6,860		
Green gain from Labour		Swing		
Labour hold		Swing		

=== De Beauvoir ===
De Beauvoir (2)
Party	Candidate	Votes	%	±%
Labour	Polly Billington*	1,400	73.0	
Labour	Tom Dewey	1,102	57.5	
Green	Heather Finlay	538	28.1	
Liberal Democrats	John Hodgson	302	15.7	
Green	Nicholas Lee	288	15.0	
Ind. Network	Samantha May	205	10.7	
Majority		862	45.0	
Majority		564	29.4	
Turnout		2,213	33.36	
Rejected ballots		25	1.1	
Registered electors		6,634		
Labour hold		Swing		
Labour hold		Swing		

=== Hackney Central ===
Hackney Central (3)
Party	Candidate	Votes	%	±%
Labour	Sophie Conway*	2,214	73.9	
Labour	Sheila Suso-Runge	1,994	66.6	
Labour	Benjamin Hayhurst*	1,877	62.7	
Green	Florence Wedmore	651	21.7	
Green	Nicholas Costley-White	561	18.7	
Green	Stefan Liberadzki	519	17.3	
Liberal Democrats	Patricia Holloway	268	8.9	
Ind. Network	Clair Battaglino	214	7.1	
Ind. Network	Imogen O'Rorke	189	6.3	
Ind. Network	Desmond Kirby	173	5.8	
Liberal Democrats	Dave Raval	170	5.7	
Liberal Democrats	Peter Kellett	158	5.3	
Majority		1,563	52.2	
Majority		1,343	44.8	
Majority		1,226	40.9	
Turnout		3,169	33.39	
Rejected ballots		32	1.0	
Registered electors		9,492		
Labour hold		Swing		
Labour hold		Swing		
Labour hold		Swing		

=== Hackney Downs ===
Hackney Downs (3)
Party	Candidate	Votes	%	±%
Labour	Michael Desmond*	1,823	51.3	
Labour	Sem Moema*	1,748	49.2	
Green	Alastair Binnie-Lubbock	1,667	46.9	
Labour	Anna-Joy Rickard*	1,636	46.1	
Green	Bettina Maidment	1,573	44.3	
Green	Charlie Norman	1,316	37.0	
Conservative	Agnieszka Cuellar-Bridy	194	5.5	
Liberal Democrats	Erika Merguigi	184	5.2	
Conservative	Joanna Wojciechowska	161	4.5	
Conservative	Nikodem Mikolajewski	155	4.4	
Ind. Network	Ruth Parkinson	101	2.8	
TUSC	Clare Doyle	99	2.8	
Majority		187	5.3	
Majority		112	3.2	
Majority		31	0.9	
Turnout		3,783	39.95	
Rejected ballots		16	0.4	
Registered electors		9,469		
Labour hold		Swing		
Labour hold		Swing		
Green gain from Labour		Swing		

=== Hackney Wick ===
Hackney Wick (3)
Party	Candidate	Votes	%	±%
Labour	Jessica Webb*	1,729	72.8	
Labour	Chris Kennedy*	1,675	70.5	
Labour	Joseph Ogundemuren	1,603	67.5	
Green	Laura Salisbury	654	27.5	
Green	Clive Ardagh	439	18.5	
Green	Stuart Coggins	407	17.1	
Conservative	Anna Socha	190	8.0	
Conservative	Piotr Lipinski	185	7.8	
Conservative	Piotr Pietrzyk	172	7.2	
Independent	Vernon Williams	70	2.9	
Majority		1,075	45.3	
Majority		1,021	43.0	
Majority		949	40.0	
Turnout		2,740	30.03	
Rejected ballots		24	0.9	
Registered electors		9,125		
Labour hold		Swing		
Labour hold		Swing		
Labour hold		Swing		

=== Haggerston ===
Haggerston (3)
Party	Candidate	Votes	%	±%
Labour	Humaira Garasia*	1,786	73.8	
Labour	Midnight Ross	1,604	66.2	
Labour	Jon Narcross	1,503	62.1	
Green	Kathryne Chalker	711	29.4	
Green	Alice Spendley	643	26.6	
Green	Maxime Vers	453	18.7	
Conservative	Karolina Bugaric	325	13.4	
Ind. Network	Niall Crowley	240	9.9	
Majority		1,075	44.4	
Majority		993	41.0	
Majority		892	36.8	
Turnout		2,902	28.88	
Rejected ballots		22	0.8	
Registered electors		10,049		
Labour hold		Swing		
Labour hold		Swing		
Labour hold		Swing		

=== Homerton ===
Homerton (3)
Party	Candidate	Votes	%	±%
Labour	Anna Lynch*	1,922	78.4	
Labour	Robert Chapman*	1,720	70.2	
Labour	Guy Nicholson*	1,616	66.0	
Green	Brenda Puech	700	28.6	
Green	Benjamin Newman	623	25.4	
Green	Thomas Richardson	503	20.5	
Conservative	Milton Morris	267	10.9	
Majority		1,222	49.9	
Majority		1,020	41.6	
Majority		916	37.4	
Turnout		2,803	30.96	
Rejected ballots		25	0.9	
Registered electors		9,054		
Labour hold		Swing		
Labour hold		Swing		
Labour hold		Swing		

=== Hoxton East & Shoreditch ===
Hoxton East and Shoreditch (3)
Party	Candidate	Votes	%	±%
Labour	Kam Adams*	1,354	74.4	
Labour	Anya Sizer*	1,175	64.5	
Labour	Steve Race*	1,081	59.4	
Green	Conan Cook	374	20.5	
Green	Chesca Walton	367	20.2	
Green	Nicholas Thorp	278	15.3	
Liberal Democrats	John Clinch	277	15.2	
Ind. Network	Peter Smorthit	234	12.9	
Conservative	Sandy Nkolomoni	230	12.6	
TUSC	Chris Newby	93	5.1	
Majority		980	53.8	
Majority		801	44.0	
Majority		707	38.8	
Turnout		2,068	24.49	
Rejected ballots		12	0.6	
Registered electors		8,444		
Labour hold		Swing		
Labour hold		Swing		
Labour hold		Swing		

=== Hoxton West ===
Hoxton West (3)
Party	Candidate	Votes	%	±%
Labour	Yvonne Maxwell*	1,574	73.4	
Labour	Clayeon McKenzie*	1,308	61.0	
Labour	Carole Williams*	1,308	61.0	
Conservative	Oliver Hall	452	21.1	
Green	Cheuk Ho	449	20.9	
Green	Daniel Enzer	447	20.8	
Green	Kit McCarthy	423	19.7	
Liberal Democrats	Geoffrey Payne	365	17.0	
TUSC	Robert Williams	108	5.0	
Majority		1,122	52.3	
Majority		856	39.9	
Majority		856	39.9	
Turnout		2,599	26.57	
Rejected ballots		24	0.9	
Registered electors		9,781		
Labour hold		Swing		
Labour hold		Swing		
Labour hold		Swing		

=== King's Park ===
King's Park (3)
Party	Candidate	Votes	%	±%
Labour	Sharon Patrick*	1,948	76.6	
Labour	Lynne Troughton*	1,739	68.4	
Labour	Ali Sadek	1,726	67.9	
Green	Josephine Wilby	931	36.6	
Green	Peter Jones	682	26.8	
Green	Donell Walter	604	23.7	
Majority		1,017	40.0	
Majority		808	31.8	
Majority		795	31.3	
Turnout		2,973	31.89	
Rejected ballots		45	1.5	
Registered electors		9,322		
Labour hold		Swing		
Labour hold		Swing		
Labour hold		Swing		

=== Lea Bridge ===
Lea Bridge (3)
Party	Candidate	Votes	%	±%
Labour	Margaret Gordon*	2,080	70.3	
Labour	Ian Rathbone*	1,802	60.9	
Labour	Deniz Oguzkanli*	1,732	58.6	
Green	Ruth Jenkins	881	29.8	
Green	Douglas Earl	716	24.2	
Green	Sally Zlotowitz	692	23.4	
Liberal Democrats	Juliette Bigley	322	10.9	
Conservative	Yaakov Lauer	224	7.6	
Conservative	Marzena Sterner	218	7.4	
Conservative	Yeshoah Leibowitz	204	6.9	
Majority		1,199	40.5	
Majority		921	31.1	
Majority		851	28.8	
Turnout		3,212	31.62	
Rejected ballots		18	0.6	
Registered electors		10,158		
Labour hold		Swing		
Labour hold		Swing		
Labour hold		Swing		

=== London Fields ===
London Fields (3)
Party	Candidate	Votes	%	±%
Labour	Anntoinette Bramble*	2,156	81.5	
Labour	M Can Ozsen*	1,741	65.8	
Labour	Lee Laudat-Scott	1,685	63.7	
Green	Carrie Hamilton	915	34.6	
Green	Graham Woodruff	498	18.8	
Green	Paul Urwin	474	17.9	
Liberal Democrats	Les Kelly	464	17.5	
Majority		1,241	46.9	
Majority		826	31.2	
Majority		770	29.1	
Turnout		3,052	33.38	
Rejected ballots		59	1.9	
Registered electors		9,144		
Labour hold		Swing		
Labour hold		Swing		
Labour hold		Swing		

=== Shacklewell ===
Shacklewell (2)
Party	Candidate	Votes	%	±%
Labour	Richard Lufkin*	1,269	71.8	
Labour	Ifraah Samatar	969	54.8	
Green	Benjamin Hughes	458	25.9	
Green	Felix Thomson	314	17.8	
Liberal Democrats	Christian Adams	202	11.4	
Conservative	Andrzej Krajewski	163	9.2	
Ind. Network	Romaine Murray	160	9.1	
Majority		811	45.9	
Majority		511	28.9	
Turnout		2,137	34.03	
Rejected ballots		17	0.8	
Registered electors		6,280		
Labour hold		Swing		
Labour hold		Swing		

=== Springfield ===
Springfield (3)
Party	Candidate	Votes	%	±%
Conservative	Simche Steinberger*	2,273	61.4	
Conservative	Shaul Krautwirt	2,144	57.9	
Conservative	Michael Levy*	2,102	56.8	
Labour	Christiana Ajiginni	1,269	34.3	
Labour	Michael Jones	1,179	31.9	
Labour	Laura Pascal	1,156	31.2	
Green	Celia Coram	272	7.3	
Green	Julie-Anne Hogbin	259	7.0	
Green	Noah Birksted-Breen	254	6.9	
Liberal Democrats	Sean Boylan	76	2.1	
Liberal Democrats	Clifford Gully	73	2.0	
Liberal Democrats	Mark Smulian	46	1.2	
Majority		1,004	27.1	
Majority		875	23.6	
Majority		833	22.5	
Turnout		3,957	40.20	
Rejected ballots		17	0.4	
Registered electors		9,843		
Conservative hold		Swing		
Conservative hold		Swing		
Conservative hold		Swing		

=== Stamford Hill West ===
Stamford Hill West (2)
Party	Candidate	Votes	%	±%
Conservative	Hershy Lisser*	1,795	59.2	
Conservative	Benzion Papier*	1,782	58.8	
Labour	Ahmad Bismillah	1,105	36.5	
Labour	Faruk Tinaz	972	32.1	
Green	Johnny Dixon	170	5.6	
Green	Lewis Garland	130	4.3	
Liberal Democrats	Tony Harms	55	1.8	
Liberal Democrats	Peter Friend	52	1.7	
Majority		690	22.8	
Majority		677	22.3	
Turnout		3,193	49.24	
Rejected ballots		11	0.3	
Registered electors		6,485		
Conservative hold		Swing		
Conservative hold		Swing		

=== Stoke Newington ===
Stoke Newington (3)
Party	Candidate	Votes	%	±%
Labour	Mete Coban*	2,350	66.3	
Labour	Susan Fajana-Thomas*	2,221	62.6	
Labour	Gilbert Smyth*	1,831	51.6	
Green	Charlene Concepcion	1,332	37.6	
Green	Siobhan MacMahon	1,015	28.6	
Green	Richard Scarborough	580	16.4	
Liberal Democrats	Thrusie Maurseth-Cahill	407	11.5	
Conservative	Anna Chomicz	289	8.1	
Conservative	Pauline Levy	260	7.3	
Conservative	Weronika Zolnierzak	234	6.6	
TUSC	Robert Thomas	120	3.4	
Majority		1,018	28.7	
Majority		889	25.1	
Majority		499	14.1	
Turnout		3,873	38.62	
Rejected ballots		32	0.8	
Registered electors		10,028		
Labour hold		Swing		
Labour hold		Swing		
Labour hold		Swing		

=== Victoria ===
Victoria (3)
Party	Candidate	Votes	%	±%
Labour	Clare Joseph*	1,888	73.1	
Labour	Claudia Turbet-Delof	1,539	59.6	
Labour	Penny Wrout	1,459	56.5	
Green	Sandra McLeod	678	26.3	
Green	Rolf Dekker	545	21.1	
Green	Wendy Robinson	477	18.5	
Liberal Democrats	Helen Baxter	447	17.3	
Conservative	Monika Hoppe-Krajewska	284	11.0	
Conservative	Lejla Softic	236	9.1	
TUSC	Margaret Trotter	104	4.0	
TUSC	Jamie Barber	89	3.4	
Majority		1,210	46.9	
Majority		861	33.3	
Majority		781	30.2	
Turnout		2,957	33.02	
Rejected ballots		23	0.8	
Registered electors		8,955		
Labour hold		Swing		
Labour hold		Swing		
Labour hold		Swing		

=== Woodberry Down ===
Woodberry Down (2)
Party	Candidate	Votes	%	±%
Labour	Caroline Selman*	1,441	71.4	
Labour	Sarah Young*	1,189	58.9	
Green	Catherine O'Shea	452	22.4	
Green	Anthony Rose	438	21.7	
Conservative	Yisroel Cik	276	13.7	
Conservative	Agnieszka Wypych	238	11.8	
Majority		989	49.0	
Majority		737	36.5	
Turnout		2,296	30.02	
Rejected ballots		13	0.6	
Registered electors		7,649		
Labour hold		Swing		
Labour hold		Swing		

== Changes 2022–2026 ==
- September 2023: Philip Glanville resigned as Mayor of Hackney; his last day in office was 22 September 2023, with the statutory deputy mayor, Anntoinette Bramble, acting in his place pending a by-election.
- November 2023: Caroline Woodley was elected Mayor of Hackney at the resulting mayoral by-election.
- May 2024: Labour councillors Claudia Turbet-Delof and Penny Wrout, who represented Victoria, and Fliss Premru, who represented Clissold, resigned from Labour to form an independent group.
- January 2026: M Can Ozsen, a Labour councillor for London Fields, left Labour.

=== By-elections ===
==== De Beauvoir ====
The by-election was triggered by the resignation of Labour councillor Tom Dewey eleven days after he was elected. Dewey was later convicted of possessing indecent images of children.

De Beauvoir by-election, 7 July 2022
Party	Candidate	Votes	%	±%
Labour	Joe Walker	758	41.8	▼23.5
Green	Tyrone Scott	731	40.3	▲18.8
Liberal Democrats	Thrusie Maurseth-Cahill	133	7.3	▼0.1
Ind. Network	Kelly Reid	83	4.6	▼0.1
Conservative	Oliver Hall	82	4.5	N/A
Women's Equality	Kristal Bayliss	27	1.5	N/A
Majority		27	1.5	
Turnout		1,822	27.64	−5.8
Labour hold		Swing	▼21.1	

==== Cazenove ====
The by-election was triggered when Labour councillor Caroline Woodley gave up her Cazenove council seat after being elected Mayor of Hackney at the 2023 mayoral by-election.

Cazenove by-election, 18 January 2024
Party	Candidate	Votes	%	±%
Conservative	Ian Sharer	1,623	53.8	▲47.5
Labour	Laura Pascal	935	31.0	▼12.2
Green	Tamara Micner	387	12.8	▲1.2
Liberal Democrats	Dave Raval	73	2.4	▼34.5
Majority		688	22.8	N/A
Turnout		3,018	31.92	–7.3
Registered electors		9,455		
Conservative gain from Labour		Swing	▲29.9	

==== De Beauvoir ====
The by-election was triggered by the resignation of Labour councillor Polly Billington, who had been selected as Labour's parliamentary candidate for East Thanet. It was on the same day as the London mayoral election and London Assembly election. Vote share changes displayed are relative to the 2022 by-election.

De Beauvoir by-election, 2 May 2024
Party	Candidate	Votes	%	±%
Labour	Jasmine Martins	1,316	46.7	▲4.9
Green	Antoinette Fernandez	1,197	42.5	▲2.2
Conservative	Tareke Gregg	174	6.2	▲1.7
Liberal Democrats	Thrusie Maurseth-Cahill	129	4.6	▼2.8
Majority		119	4.2	
Turnout		2,844	42.95	+15.4
Labour hold		Swing	▲1.4	

==== Hoxton East and Shoreditch ====
The by-election was called after Labour councillor Steve Race resigned to concentrate on his campaign as Labour's parliamentary candidate for Exeter. The by-election was on the same day as the London mayoral election and London Assembly election.

Hoxton East and Shoreditch by-election, 2 May 2024
Party	Candidate	Votes	%	±%
Labour	Faruk Tinaz	1,587	59.2	▼6.9
Green	Liam Davis	560	20.9	▲2.2
Conservative	Samuel Iheanyi Adele	318	11.9	▲7.6
Liberal Democrats	Becket McGrath	217	8.1	▲3.0
Majority		1,027	38.3	
Turnout			31.92	
Labour hold		Swing	▼4.6	

==== Hoxton West ====
The by-election was triggered by the resignation of Labour councillor Yvonne Maxwell.

Hoxton West by-election, 27 June 2024
Party	Candidate	Votes	%	±%
Labour	Ben Lucas	880	64.0	▲10.6
Green	Cheuk Ho	238	17.3	▲1.8
Conservative	Farhan Jaisin	154	11.2	▼4.3
Liberal Democrats	Geoffrey Payne	103	7.5	▼4.4
Majority		642	46.7	▼9.4
Turnout		1,375	13.88	▼10.6
Labour hold		Swing	▲4.7	

==== Cazenove ====
The by-election was called after Labour councillor Eluzer Goldberg resigned, citing family commitments and his work schedule. The by-election took place on the same day as the 2024 United Kingdom general election. Vote share changes displayed are relative to the January 2024 by-election.

Cazenove by-election, 4 July 2024
Party	Candidate	Votes	%	±%
Labour	Patrick Pinkerton	1,974	37.4	▲6.4
Conservative	Hershi Moskovits	1,838	34.8	▼19.0
Green	Tamara Micner	1,170	22.2	▲9.4
Liberal Democrats	Ken Gabbott-Rolph	150	2.8	▲0.4
Independent	Faisal Riyaj Ibji	147	2.8	new
Turnout		5,279	52.17	▲20.3
Labour hold		Swing	▲12.7	

==== London Fields ====
The by-election was triggered by the resignation and arrest of Labour councillor Lee Laudat-Scott.

London Fields by-election, 12 September 2024
Party	Candidate	Votes	%	±%
Labour	George Gooch	746	54.1	▼6.9
Independent	Sarah Byrne (Note: Sarah Byrne ran with support from Green Party and Hackney Socialist Independent Group)	437	31.7	New
Conservative	Diana Mikolajewska	72	5.2	New
Liberal Democrats	Peter Friend	71	5.2	▼8.0
Workers Party	Olivia Taylor	52	3.8	New
Majority		309	22.4	
Turnout		1,378	14.49	−18.91
Labour hold		Swing		

==== Stoke Newington ====
The by-election was caused by the resignation of Labour councillor Mete Coban after he was appointed Deputy Mayor of London for Environment and Energy.

Stoke Newington by-election, 12 September 2024
Party	Candidate	Votes	%	±%
Green	Liam Davis	1,253	53.0	▲19.5
Labour	Zak Davies-Khan	945	40.0	▼19.2
Liberal Democrats	Thrusie Maurseth-Cahill	78	3.3	▼8.2
Conservative	Tareke Gregg	74	3.1	▼4.1
Independent	Tan Bui	12	0.5	new
Majority		308	13.0	N/A
Turnout		2,362	20.35	−18.25
Green gain from Labour		Swing	▲19.3	

The Green Party gained the seat, increasing their representation on the council to three seats, the highest number they have held since 1998, when they held two seats. The last time the Green Party won a by-election from opposition in London was 2008.
