= Dalston (Hackney ward) =

- Electoral ward for the Hackney London Borough Council
- Dalston ward boundaries since 2014
- Borough: Hackney
- County: Greater London
- Population: 8,880 (2021)
- Electorate: 6,860 (2022)
- Major settlements: Dalston
- Area: 0.5308 square kilometres (0.2049 sq mi)

Current electoral ward
- Created: 1965
- Number of members: 2
- Councillors: Rachel Nkiessu-Guifo; Manal Massalha
- ONS code: 00AMGE (2002–2014)
- GSS code: E05000235 (2002–2014); E05009370 (2014–present)

Dalston is a ward in the London Borough of Hackney. It roughly corresponds to the Dalston area of London. The ward has existed since the creation of the borough on 1 April 1965 and was first used in the 1964 elections. The boundaries of the ward from May 2014 are revised.

== Hackney council elections since 2014 ==
There was a revision of ward boundaries in Hackney in 2014.

=== 2026 by-election ===
The by-election took place on 25 June 2026, following the election of Zoë Garbett as mayor of Hackney. (Note: Under section 71 of the Local Government Act 2000, a person may not simultaneously hold the offices of elected mayor and councillor within the same local authority, resulting in a vacancy in the ward and the triggering of a by-election.)

2026 Dalston by-election
Party	Candidate	Votes	%	±%
Green	Manal Massalha	549	57.7	−2.6
Labour	Grace Adebayo	342	36.0	+6.9
Reform	Ivon Fleming	26	2.7	−0.1
Liberal Democrats	Peter Munro	24	2.5	−2.0
Conservative	Jerry Sulaiman	10	1.1	−2.3
Turnout			13	
Green hold		Swing		

=== 2026 election ===
The election took place on 7 May 2026.

2026 Hackney London Borough Council election: Dalston (2)
Party	Candidate	Votes	%	±%
Green	Zoë Garbett	1,862		
Green	Rachel Nkiessu-Guifo	1,394		
Labour	Grace Adebayo	897		
Labour	John McAreavey	635		
Liberal Democrats	Brandon Hadwin	140		
Conservative	Brandon Hullett	102		
Reform	Uzo Owoh	87		
Conservative	Jerry Sulaiman	72		
Majority		965		
Majority		497		
Turnout			40.6	▲2.8
Green hold		Swing		
Green gain from Labour		Swing		

=== 2022 election ===
The election took place on 5 May 2022.

2022 Hackney London Borough Council election: Dalston
Party	Candidate	Votes	%	±%
Green	Zoë Garbett	1,446	62.8	
Labour	Grace Adebayo	1,199	52.1	
Green	Tyrone Scott	920	39.9	
Labour	Peter Snell	727	31.6	
Liberal Democrats	Alton Hassan	138	6.0	
Ind. Network	Olu Adesanu	89	3.9	
Ind. Network	Esther Petrou	87	3.8	
Turnout			37.8	
Green gain from Labour		Swing		
Labour hold		Swing		

=== 2018 election ===
The election took place on 3 May 2018.

2018 Hackney London Borough Council election: Dalston
Party	Candidate	Votes	%	±%
Labour	Soraya Adejare Adesanu	1,237	50.6	
Labour	Peter Snell	978	40.0	
Green	Alex Armitage	957	39.1	
Green	Dan Thompson	545	22.3	
Women's Equality	Harini Iyengar	314	12.8	
Liberal Democrats	Hayley Dove	154	6.3	
Liberal Democrats	Becket McGrath	99	4.0	
Conservative	Anna Chomicz	98	4.0	
Conservative	Jack Sutcliffe	93	3.8	
Majority				
Turnout			36.8	
Labour hold		Swing		
Labour hold		Swing		

== 2002–2014 Hackney council elections ==
There was a revision of ward boundaries in Hackney in 2002.

It now forms part of the Hackney North and Stoke Newington constituency. Previously, the ward was split between the two Hackney constituencies, the other half being part of Hackney South and Shoreditch. The population of this ward at the 2011 census was 14,727.

== 1978–2002 Hackney council elections ==
There was a revision of ward boundaries in Hackney in 1978. In 2001, Dalston ward had a total population of 10,722. This compares with the average ward population within the borough of 10,674.

== 1965–1978 Hackney council elections ==
Dalston ward has existed since the creation of the London Borough of Hackney on 1 April 1965. It was first used in the 1964 elections, with an electorate of 7,914, returning three councillors.
