= Haggerston (ward) =

Electoral ward in England

Coordinates: 51.531°N 0.075°W

- Electoral ward for the Hackney London Borough Council
- Haggerston ward boundaries since 2014
- Borough: Hackney
- County: Greater London
- Population: 14,409 (2021)
- Electorate: 10,049 (2022)
- Major settlements: Haggerston
- Area: 0.8606 square kilometres (0.3323 sq mi)

Current electoral ward
- Created: 1965
- Number of members: 3
- Councillors: Humaira Garasia; Midnight Ross; Jon Narcross
- ONS code: 00AMGJ (2002–2014)
- GSS code: E05000239 (2002–2014); E05009375 (2014–present)

Haggerston is a ward in the London Borough of Hackney and forms part of the Hackney South and Shoreditch constituency. It roughly aligns with the core area of the neighborhood of Haggerston and some of Shoreditch and Hoxton.

== Hackney council elections since 2014 ==
=== 2022 election ===
The election took place on 5 May 2022.

2022 Hackney London Borough Council election: Haggerston
Party	Candidate	Votes	%	±%
Labour	Humaira Garasia	1,786	73.8	
Labour	Midnight Ross	1,604	66.2	
Labour	Jon Narcross	1,503	62.1	
Green	Kathryne Chalker	711	29.4	
Green	Alice Spendley	643	26.6	
Green	Maxime Vers	453	18.7	
Conservative	Karolina Bugaric	325	13.4	
Ind. Network	Niall Crowley	240	9.9	
Turnout			28.9	
Labour hold		Swing		
Labour hold		Swing		
Labour hold		Swing		

=== 2018 election ===
The election took place on 3 May 2018.

2018 Hackney London Borough Council election: Haggerston
Party	Candidate	Votes	%	±%
Labour	Ajay Chauhan	2,128	66.4	
Labour	Patrick Spence	2,117	66.1	
Labour	Humaira Garasia	2,033	63.5	
Green	Gideon Corby	545	17.0	
Green	Deepa Shah	398	12.4	
Green	Paul Urwin	368	11.5	
Liberal Democrats	James Neville	261	8.1	
Liberal Democrats	Bella Sharer	184	5.7	
Conservative	Miroslawa Dabrowska	183	5.7	
Liberal Democrats	Geoffrey Payne	182	5.7	
Conservative	Sean Sullivan	182	5.7	
Conservative	Monika Hoppe-Krajewska	164	5.1	
Majority				
Turnout			33.0	
Labour hold		Swing		
Labour hold		Swing		
Labour hold		Swing		

=== 2014 election ===
The ward returns three councillors to Borough Council. At the 22 May 2014 local elections Ann Munn, Jonathan McShane, and Barry Buitekant, all Labour Party candidates, were returned. Turnout was 34.91%.
