= 2018 Hackney London Borough Council election =

2018 local election in England

2018 Hackney Borough Council election
- 3 May 2018

All 57 seats to Hackney London Borough Council 29 seats needed for a majority

	First party	Second party
Party	Labour	Conservative
Last election	50 seats, 58.1%	4 seats, 12.0%
Seats won	52	5
Seat change	▲2	▲1
Popular vote	105,690	18,565
Percentage	63.0%	11.1%
Swing	▲4.9%	▼0.9%
- Map of the results of the 2018 Hackney London Borough council election. Labour in red and Conservative in blue.
Council control before election
Labour
Council control after election
Labour

Elections to Hackney London Borough Council took place on 3 May 2018. This was on the same day as other local elections.

The Labour Party retained overall control of the council, winning 52 out of 57 seats. The party gained three seats from the Liberal Democrats and lost one to the Conservative Party, for a net gain of two seats. The Green Party of England and Wales once again came second in the overall popular vote, but won no seats, falling short of a seat in Dalston ward by a margin of 21 votes.

== Results summary ==
Hackney Council election result 2018
Party	Seats	Gains	Losses	Net gain/loss	Seats %	Votes %	Votes	+/−
Labour	52	3	1	+2	91.2	63.0	105,690	+4.9
Green	0	0	0	0	0.0	16.9	28,435	-3.6
Conservative	5	1	0	+1	8.8	11.1	18,565	-0.9
Liberal Democrats	0	0	3	-3	0.0	8.6	14,513	+0.4
Women's Equality	0	0	0	0	0.0	0.2	314	New
TUSC	0	0	0	0	0.0	0.1	176	-0.7
Independent	0	0	0	0	0.0	0.0	80	-0.2
Duma Polska	0	0	0	0	0.0	0.0	24	New

== Ward results ==
Asterisk denotes the sitting councillor.

=== Brownswood ===
Brownswood (2)
Party	Candidate	Votes	%	±%
Labour	Brian Bell*	1,465	57.3	+5.8
Labour	Clare Potter*	1,399	54.8	+1.4
Green	Anne Byrne	423	16.6	−5.9
Liberal Democrats	Pauline Pearce	409	16.0	+8.2
Green	Duncan Appleby	375	14.7	−4.7
Liberal Democrats	Les Kelly	303	11.9	+5.1
Conservative	Robert Kaye	199	7.8	−1.4
Conservative	Bella Weil	134	5.2	−3.8
Majority		976	38.2	
Turnout			39.4	
Labour hold		Swing		
Labour hold		Swing		

=== Cazenove ===
Cazenove (3)
Party	Candidate	Votes	%	±%
Labour	Sam Pallis	2,148	47.8	+9.8
Labour	Anthony McMahon	2,078	46.2	+10.2
Labour	Caroline Woodley	1,973	43.9	+8.1
Liberal Democrats	Javed Isrolia	1,733	38.5	−0.4
Liberal Democrats	Ian Sharer*	1,694	37.7	−0.7
Liberal Democrats	Issac Kornbluh	1,620	36.0	−2.6
Green	Carrie Davies	441	9.8	−6.9
Green	Georgina Machray	356	7.9	−5.1
Green	David Mercer	228	5.1	−7.0
Conservative	Amy Gray	204	4.5	−0.2
Conservative	Duncan Gray	164	3.6	−0.7
Conservative	Joanna Wojciechowska	125	2.8	−0.6
Independent	Bruce Spenser	80	1.8	N/A
Majority				
Turnout			48.1	
Labour gain from Liberal Democrats		Swing		
Labour gain from Liberal Democrats		Swing		
Labour gain from Liberal Democrats		Swing		

=== Clissold ===
Clissold (3)
Party	Candidate	Votes	%	±%
Labour	Sophie Cameron*	2,548	69.3	+9.5
Labour	Sade Etti*	2,157	58.6	+10.8
Labour	Ned Hercock*	2,055	55.9	+5.9
Green	Marie Remy	889	24.2	−6.4
Green	Jim Cresswell	839	22.8	−3.9
Green	Adam Lawson	541	14.7	−10.0
Liberal Democrats	Sylvia Anderson	427	11.6	+1.9
Liberal Democrats	Simon De Deney	301	8.2	±0.0
Liberal Democrats	Marcia Roberts	264	7.2	+2.3
Conservative	Pamela Sills	186	5.1	−2.1
Conservative	Chaya Odze	184	5.0	−1.2
Conservative	Andrew White	170	4.6	−0.3
Majority				
Turnout			39.0	
Labour hold		Swing		
Labour hold		Swing		
Labour hold		Swing		

=== Dalston ===
Dalston (2)
Party	Candidate	Votes	%	±%
Labour	Soraya Adesanu*	1,237	50.6	−2.0
Labour	Peter Snell*	978	40.0	−7.8
Green	Alex Armitage	957	39.1	+9.3
Green	Dan Thompson	545	22.3	+0.4
Women's Equality	Harini Iyengar	314	12.8	N/A
Liberal Democrats	Hayley Dove	154	6.3	−1.3
Liberal Democrats	Becket McGrath	99	4.0	−2.5
Conservative	Anna Chomicz	98	4.0	−2.2
Conservative	Jack Sutcliffe	93	3.8	−0.7
Majority				
Turnout			36.8	
Labour hold		Swing		
Labour hold		Swing		

=== De Beauvoir ===
De Beauvoir (2)
Party	Candidate	Votes	%	±%
Labour	Polly Billington	1,448	62.6	+10.4
Labour	James Peters*	1,153	49.8	+1.1
Green	Heather Finlay	451	19.5	+0.9
Liberal Democrats	Darren Martin	336	14.5	+7.1
Liberal Democrats	Pippa Morgan	316	13.7	+7.8
Green	Nicholas Thorp	210	9.1	−7.2
Conservative	Amina Lunat	168	7.3	−9.6
Conservative	Mohamednasar Lunat	138	6.0	−7.4
Duma Polska	Marlena Wendel	24	1.0	N/A
Majority				
Turnout			34.6	
Labour hold		Swing		
Labour hold		Swing		

=== Hackney Central ===
Hackney Central (3)
Party	Candidate	Votes	%	±%
Labour	Sophie Conway	2,475	74.3	+12.6
Labour	Benjamin Hayhurst*	2,142	64.3	+3.0
Labour	Vincent Stops*	1,917	57.5	+1.1
Green	Charlene Concepcion	629	18.9	−3.2
Green	Siobhan MacMahon	576	17.3	−4.4
Green	Alec Rossiter	438	13.1	−8.0
Liberal Democrats	Dave Raval	256	7.7	+0.6
Liberal Democrats	Jamie Chamberlain	215	6.5	+0.5
Liberal Democrats	Joseph Richards	190	5.7	N/A
Conservative	Stephanie Schwarz	186	5.6	+0.2
Conservative	Sampson Ewurum	177	5.3	+0.4
Conservative	Heather Whitelaw	139	4.2	−1.4
Majority				
Turnout			35.4	
Labour hold		Swing		
Labour hold		Swing		
Labour hold		Swing		

=== Hackney Downs ===
Hackney Downs (3)
Party	Candidate	Votes	%	±%
Labour	Michael Desmond*	2,076	56.7	−0.6
Labour	Anna-Joy Rickard*	1,852	50.6	−6.3
Labour	Sem Moema	1,687	46.1	−8.6
Green	Alastair Binnie-Lubbock	1,597	43.6	+20.8
Green	Sheila Menon	1,134	31.0	+8.4
Green	Sally Zlotowitz	1,074	29.3	+9.8
Conservative	Mohammed Lunat	229	6.3	+0.5
Conservative	Yasmin Lunat	214	5.8	±0.0
Conservative	Agnieszka Rolkiewicz	122	3.3	−0.7
Majority				
Turnout			39.7	
Labour hold		Swing		
Labour hold		Swing		
Labour hold		Swing		

=== Hackney Wick ===
Hackney Wick (3)
Party	Candidate	Votes	%	±%
Labour	Chris Kennedy*	1,941	71.7	+8.9
Labour	Jessica Webb*	1,756	64.9	+12.7
Labour	Nick Sharman*	1,612	59.6	+1.2
Green	Joe Garbett	390	14.4	−7.4
Green	Laura Salisbury	390	14.4	−3.6
Green	Ruth Sharpe	343	12.7	−2.6
Liberal Democrats	Andreea Deac	176	6.5	−1.6
Conservative	Thomas Stancliffe	153	5.7	−1.5
Conservative	Marzena Kwasnik	148	5.5	−1.5
Liberal Democrats	James Lyons	148	5.5	−0.2
Conservative	Yehoshua Bernstein	137	5.1	−1.6
Liberal Democrats	Ken Rolph	124	4.6	+0.3
Majority				
Turnout			31.2	
Labour hold		Swing		
Labour hold		Swing		
Labour hold		Swing		

=== Haggerston ===
Haggerston (3)
Party	Candidate	Votes	%	±%
Labour	Ajay Chauhan	2,128	66.4	+9.6
Labour	Patrick Spence	2,117	66.1	+9.8
Labour	Humaira Garasia	2,033	63.5	+7.5
Green	Gideon Corby	545	17.0	−0.3
Green	Deepa Shah	398	12.4	−6.2
Green	Paul Urwin	368	11.5	−6.0
Liberal Democrats	James Neville	261	8.1	+2.5
Liberal Democrats	Bella Sharer	184	5.7	+1.6
Conservative	Miroslawa Dabrowska	183	5.7	−5.5
Liberal Democrats	Geoffrey Payne	182	5.7	+2.8
Conservative	Sean Sullivan	182	5.7	−2.2
Conservative	Monika Hoppe-Krajewska	164	5.1	−2.5
Majority				
Turnout			33.0	
Labour hold		Swing		
Labour hold		Swing		
Labour hold		Swing		

=== Homerton ===
Homerton (3)
Party	Candidate	Votes	%	±%
Labour	Robert Chapman*	2,243	73.2	+7.4
Labour	Anna Lynch	2,147	70.0	+8.1
Labour	Guy Nicholson*	1,982	64.6	+1.6
Green	Rachel Baker	587	19.1	+2.1
Green	Tamlyn Rhodes	361	11.8	−3.9
Green	John Devaney	326	10.6	−5.8
Conservative	Milton Morris	163	5.3	−1.9
Conservative	Samson Adeyemo	159	5.2	−1.0
Conservative	Edilia Emordi	144	4.7	−1.1
Liberal Democrats	Neil Jacobson	144	4.7	−2.0
Liberal Democrats	Jeffery Shenker	119	3.9	−1.8
Liberal Democrats	Mark Smulian	78	2.5	−1.4
Majority				
Turnout			34.2	
Labour hold		Swing		
Labour hold		Swing		
Labour hold		Swing		

=== Hoxton East & Shoreditch ===
Hoxton East & Shoreditch (3)
Party	Candidate	Votes	%	±%
Labour	Kam Adams*	1,530	67.5	+7.6
Labour	Feryal Demirci*	1,411	62.2	+8.6
Labour	Steve Race	1,230	54.2	+2.0
Green	Scott Elliott	355	15.7	−1.0
Green	Florence Wedmore	298	13.1	−1.7
Green	Samir Jeraj	233	10.3	−3.2
Liberal Democrats	Peter Friend	194	8.6	+1.6
Liberal Democrats	John Clinch	193	8.5	+1.5
Conservative	Philip Kenyon	193	8.5	−4.9
Liberal Democrats	Lorraine Shears	191	8.4	+1.9
Conservative	John Tinley	174	7.7	−4.5
Conservative	Louis Mosley	153	6.7	−6.7
TUSC	Chris Newby	88	3.9	−0.9
Majority				
Turnout			28.9	
Labour hold		Swing		
Labour hold		Swing		
Labour hold		Swing		

=== Hoxton West ===
Hoxton West (3)
Party	Candidate	Votes	%	±%
Labour	Yvonne Maxwell	1,771	65.7	+8.9
Labour	Clayeon McKenzie*	1,714	63.6	+7.0
Labour	Carole Williams*	1,527	56.6	+1.8
Green	Fatemeh Beyad	447	16.6	−3.6
Green	Elisabeth Whitebread	421	15.6	−0.7
Conservative	Mark Beckett	372	13.8	+1.7
Green	Chris Venables	366	13.6	−1.4
Conservative	James Kane	354	13.1	+1.7
Conservative	Alex Van Terheyden	298	11.1	+0.2
Majority				
Turnout			29.6	
Labour hold		Swing		
Labour hold		Swing		
Labour hold		Swing		

=== King's Park ===
King's Park (3)
Party	Candidate	Votes	%	±%
Labour	Sharon Patrick*	2,325	72.9	+6.7
Labour	Tom Rahilly*	2,213	69.4	+9.6
Labour	Rebecca Rennison*	2,017	63.2	+5.0
Green	Zoe Oates	486	15.2	−5.1
Green	James Morgan	472	14.8	−5.0
Green	Alex Oates	373	11.7	−5.8
Conservative	Yusuf Lunat	203	6.4	−0.1
Liberal Democrats	Joe Bell	194	6.1	+0.8
Conservative	Lumumba Morgan	171	5.4	−0.5
Liberal Democrats	Sebastian Bayer	144	4.5	+1.1
Conservative	Winifred Saunders	124	3.9	−1.9
Liberal Democrats	John Hodgson	116	3.6	N/A
Independent	Vernon Williams	91	2.9	−1.0
Majority				
Turnout			35.0	
Labour hold		Swing		
Labour hold		Swing		
Labour hold		Swing		

=== Lea Bridge ===
Lea Bridge (3)
Party	Candidate	Votes	%	±%
Labour	Margaret Gordon*	2,596	70.3	+10.9
Labour	Ian Rathbone*	2,144	58.1	+3.3
Labour	Deniz Oguzkanli*	2,096	56.8	+3.9
Green	Ruth Jenkins	737	20.0	−6.9
Green	Heather Hampson	700	19.0	−2.9
Green	Douglas Earl	574	15.6	−9.5
Conservative	Imtiyaz Lunat	321	8.7	+0.8
Liberal Democrats	Benjamin Mathis	253	6.9	+2.4
Conservative	Linda Kelly	248	6.7	−3.3
Conservative	Rumi Begum	242	6.6	+1.6
Liberal Democrats	Joseph Willits	220	6.0	+1.7
Majority				
Turnout			36.1	
Labour hold		Swing		
Labour hold		Swing		
Labour hold		Swing		

=== London Fields ===
London Fields (3)
Party	Candidate	Votes	%	±%
Labour	Anntoinette Bramble*	2,378	71.1	+9.8
Labour	Emma Plouviez*	1,972	59.0	+5.1
Labour	M Can Ozsen*	1,933	57.8	+3.2
Green	Kim Cutler	587	17.5	−6.9
Green	Nicholas Lee	527	15.8	−5.9
Green	Catherine O'Shea	475	14.2	−3.6
Liberal Democrats	Silvia Mendonca	303	9.1	−0.3
Liberal Democrats	Tom Osborn	280	8.4	+3.3
Conservative	Tahmid Chowdhury	257	7.7	−1.4
Conservative	Marcel Matthew	231	6.9	−2.0
Liberal Democrats	Bill Upex	208	6.2	+2.3
Conservative	Alistair Richardson	202	6.0	−2.5
Majority				
Turnout			37.0	
Labour hold		Swing		
Labour hold		Swing		
Labour hold		Swing		

=== Shacklewell ===
Shacklewell (2)
Party	Candidate	Votes	%	±%
Labour	Michelle Gregory*	1,363	59.9	−1.0
Labour	Richard Lufkin*	1,304	57.3	+1.5
Green	Stefan Liberadzki	339	14.9	−9.7
Green	James McDonald	313	13.7	−9.1
Liberal Democrats	Teresa Clark	165	7.2	+2.0
Liberal Democrats	Victor Alberto	119	5.2	+0.6
Conservative	Andrzej Krajewski	96	4.2	−1.3
Conservative	Agnieszka Wypych	65	2.9	−1.5
Majority				
Turnout			36.2	
Labour hold		Swing		
Labour hold		Swing		

=== Springfield ===
Springfield (3)
Party	Candidate	Votes	%	±%
Conservative	Simche Steinberger*	2,040	47.5	−0.4
Conservative	Michael Levy*	1,992	46.3	−1.5
Conservative	Harvey Odze*	1,913	44.5	−0.7
Labour	Ali Dogan	1,724	40.1	+2.0
Labour	Shabaz Khan	1,632	38.0	+0.6
Labour	Joseph Walker	1,584	36.9	+1.1
Green	Ellie Keggin	376	8.7	+0.1
Green	Robert Rayner	260	6.0	−1.1
Green	Thomas Stern	230	5.4	−1.6
Majority				
Turnout			46.4	
Conservative hold		Swing		
Conservative hold		Swing		
Conservative hold		Swing		

=== Stamford Hill West ===
Stamford Hill West (2)
Party	Candidate	Votes	%	±%
Conservative	Benzion Papier*	1,469	49.2	+9.7
Conservative	Aron Klein	1,468	49.2	+10.2
Labour	Simon Dixon	1,133	38.0	+1.3
Labour	Rosemary Sales*	1,013	34.0	−11.8
Green	Bronwen Jones	160	5.4	−4.9
Green	Charles Dreyer	155	5.2	−4.6
Liberal Democrats	Anthony Harms	78	2.6	−1.1
Liberal Democrats	Andrew Neadley	50	1.7	−0.1
Majority				
Turnout			49.5	
Conservative gain from Labour		Swing		
Conservative hold		Swing		

=== Stoke Newington ===
Stoke Newington (3)
Party	Candidate	Votes	%	±%
Labour	Susan Fajana-Thomas*	2,605	64.1	+11.2
Labour	Mete Coban*	2,581	63.5	+11.3
Labour	Gilbert Smyth	2,111	51.9	−6.6
Green	Fiona Dowson	991	24.4	−4.5
Green	Elinor Lewis	748	18.4	−7.6
Green	Henry Greenwood	627	15.4	−7.9
Liberal Democrats	Juliette Bigley	446	11.0	+4.7
Liberal Democrats	Alton Hassan	305	7.5	+2.8
Liberal Democrats	John O'Brien	299	7.4	+3.1
Conservative	Pauline Levy	232	5.7	−1.5
Conservative	Diana Mikolajewska	184	4.5	−0.6
Conservative	Francis Nwokedi	167	4.1	−0.7
TUSC	Mick Cotter	88	2.2	−1.7
Majority				
Turnout			39.8	
Labour hold		Swing		
Labour hold		Swing		
Labour hold		Swing		

=== Victoria ===
Victoria (3)
Party	Candidate	Votes	%	±%
Labour	Katie Hanson*	2,271	74.1	+13.7
Labour	Clare Joseph	1,880	61.3	−0.2
Labour	Alex Kuye	1,709	55.7	−0.7
Green	Sandra McLeod	575	18.8	±0.0
Green	Wendy Robinson	385	12.6	−4.2
Green	Liam Palmer	302	9.8	−7.4
Liberal Democrats	Heather James	299	9.8	+4.3
Liberal Democrats	Jeffry Gabbott-Rolph	270	8.8	+4.0
Conservative	Salma Lunat	229	7.5	−0.7
Conservative	John Moir	212	6.9	−1.0
Conservative	Susan Moir	210	6.8	+2.4
Liberal Democrats	David Sommer	160	5.2	+1.9
Majority				
Turnout			34.6	
Labour hold		Swing		
Labour hold		Swing		
Labour hold		Swing		

=== Woodberry Down ===
Woodberry Down (2)
Party	Candidate	Votes	%	±%
Labour	Jon Burke*	1,668	68.2	+4.5
Labour	Caroline Selman*	1,508	61.7	+4.6
Green	James Pike	260	10.6	−1.2
Green	Daniel Alexander	252	10.3	−0.5
Conservative	Debbie Seepersad	231	9.5	−8.2
Liberal Democrats	Carol Chan	170	7.0	+2.8
Conservative	Christopher Sills	151	6.2	−10.0
Liberal Democrats	Myall Hornsby	123	5.0	+2.0
Majority				
Turnout			34.8	
Labour hold		Swing		
Labour hold		Swing		

== By-elections ==
=== Hoxton East and Shoreditch ===
Hoxton East and Shoreditch: 6 May 2021
Party	Candidate	Votes	%	±%
Labour	Anya Sizer	1,504	54.0	−13.3
Green	Charlotte Owusu-Allen	454	16.3	+0.7
Conservative	Jasmine Cannon-Ikurusi	307	11.0	+2.5
Liberal Democrats	Helen Baxter	253	9.1	+0.6
Independent	Niall Crowley	222	8.0	N/A
TUSC	Chris Newby	47	1.7	N/A
Majority		1,050	37.7	
Turnout		2,787		
Labour hold		Swing	▼7.0	

=== King's Park ===
King's Park: 6 May 2021
Party	Candidate	Votes	%	±%
Labour	Lynne Troughton	2,484	64.1	−6.4
Green	Peter Jones	636	16.4	+1.7
Conservative	Sandy Ngongo-Nkolomoni	279	7.2	+1.0
Independent	Clair Battaglino	151	3.9	N/A
Liberal Democrats	Elizabeth Prochaska	136	3.5	−2.4
Independent	Ben Mathis	120	3.1	N/A
TUSC	Naomi Byron	72	1.9	N/A
Majority		1,848	47.7	
Turnout		3,878		
Labour hold		Swing	▼4.1	

=== Stamford Hill West ===
Stamford Hill West: 6 May 2021
Party	Candidate	Votes	%	±%
Conservative	Harshy Lisser	1,456	50.3	−1.4
Labour	Rosemary Sales	1,192	41.2	+1.3
Green	Johnny Dixon	189	6.5	+0.9
Liberal Democrats	Anthony Harms	59	2.0	−0.7
Majority		264	9.1	
Turnout		2,896		
Conservative hold		Swing	▼1.4	

=== Woodberry Down ===
Woodberry Down: 6 May 2021
Party	Candidate	Votes	%	±%
Labour	Sarah Young	1,680	57.7	−13.9
Green	Alice Bennett	535	18.4	+7.2
Conservative	Ari Feferkorn	530	18.2	+8.3
Liberal Democrats	Alton Hassan	167	5.7	−1.6
Majority		1,145	39.3	
Turnout		2,912		
Labour hold		Swing	▼10.6	
