= 1994 Hackney London Borough Council election =

1994 local election in England

← 1990	5 May 1994	1998 →

All 60 seats up for election to Hackney London Borough Council 31 seats needed for a majority
- Registered: 123,690
- Turnout: 47,296, 38.24% (▲2.16)

	First party	Second party	Third party
Party	Labour	Liberal Democrats	Conservative
Last election	48 seats, 55.87%	8 seats, 15.78%	4 seats, 23.09%
Seats before	46	7	7
Seats won	44	10	6
Seat change	▼2	▲3	▼1
Popular vote	66,507	22,592	26,147
Percentage	56.37%	19.15%	22.16%
Swing	▲0.50	▲3.37	▼0.93
Council control before election
Labour
Council control after election
Labour

The 1994 Hackney Council election took place on 5 May 1994 to elect members of Hackney London Borough Council in London, England. The whole council was up for election and the Labour party gained overall control of the council.

== Election result ==
1994 Hackney London Borough Council elections
Party	Seats	Gains	Losses	Net gain/loss	Seats %	Votes %	Votes	+/−
Labour	44	5	7	▼2	73.33	56.37	66,507	▲0.50
Liberal Democrats	10	4	1	▲3	16.67	19.15	22,592	▲3.37
Conservative	6	3	4	▼1	10.00	22.16	26,147	▼0.93
Green	0	0	0	Steady	0.00	2.16	2,553	▼3.01
Communist	0	0	0	Steady	0.00	0.16	187	▲0.08
Total	60						117,986	

== Ward results ==
(*) - Indicates an incumbent candidate

(†) - Indicates an incumbent candidate standing in a different ward

=== Brownswood ===
Brownswood (2)
Party	Candidate	Votes	%	±%
Labour	Peter Kenyon	1,218	75.69	▲23.61
Labour	Mukhtar Ali	1,129		
Conservative	Joan Hillier	390	24.31	▼1.73
Conservative	Rita Thain	363		
Registered electors		5,010		▼508
Turnout		1,665	33.23	▼0.22
Rejected ballots		17	1.02	▲0.91
Labour hold				
Labour hold				

=== Chatham ===
Chatham (3)
Party	Candidate	Votes	%	±%
Labour	Anthony Goodchild^{†} (Note: Goodchild was a sitting councillor representing the Northfield ward)	1,044	54.86	▲5.39
Labour	Faruk Miah	938		
Labour	Jeffery Shenker	915		
Liberal Democrats	Helen Lane	489	26.29	New
Liberal Democrats	David Peacock	457		
Liberal Democrats	Justin Lewis	443		
Conservative	Gillian Murray	354	18.85	▼11.86
Conservative	Goknur Enver	327		
Conservative	Baysan Hassan	316		
Registered electors		5,705		▼689
Turnout		1,997	35.00	▲0.33
Rejected ballots		7	0.35	▲0.17
Labour hold				
Labour hold				
Labour hold				

=== Clissold ===
Clissold (3)
Party	Candidate	Votes	%	±%
Labour	Meral Ece	1,390	58.29	▼18.54
Labour	Christopher Gardiner	1,281		
Labour	William O'Connor*	1,262		
Green	Suzanne Bosworth	374	16.63	New
Liberal Democrats	Kevin Brock	345	13.74	New
Liberal Democrats	David Bartlett	312		
Conservative	Stephen Mansell	271	11.34	▼11.83
Liberal Democrats	Philip Stark	269		
Conservative	Glenda Aussenberg	263		
Conservative	Pamela Sills	232		
Registered electors		6,265		▼676
Turnout		2,158	34.45	▲1.59
Rejected ballots		8	0.37	▼1.03
Labour hold				
Labour hold				
Labour hold				

=== Dalston ===
Dalston (3)
Party	Candidate	Votes	%	±%
Labour	Philip Pearson	1,113	60.29	▲13.17
Labour	Helen Cooper	1,099		
Labour	Nicholas Tallentire*	1,031		
Liberal Democrats	Neil Hughes	411	21.14	▲6.43
Liberal Democrats	David Heigham	364		
Liberal Democrats	Linda Woodward	363		
Conservative	Colin Campbell	346	18.57	▲2.47
Conservative	Christopher Ballingall	342		
Conservative	Clare Bramley	312		
Registered electors		5,368		▼659
Turnout		2,001	37.28	▲3.20
Rejected ballots		3	0.15	Steady
Labour hold				
Labour hold				
Labour hold				

=== De Beauvoir ===
De Beauvoir (3)
Party	Candidate	Votes	%	±%
Labour	John Richards* (Note: Richards was originally elected as a Liberal Democrat but resigned the whip since then, first becoming a Conservative councillor before switching to Labour)	1,034	39.81	▲8.33
Labour	Madeleine Spanswick	942		
Labour	Modomu Sillah	926		
Conservative	Philip McCullogh* (Note: McCullogh replaced Cllr Thomas Brake after his resignation in 1991)	911	35.69	▲26.91
Conservative	Robert Jones	845		
Conservative	Robert Richier	844		
Liberal Democrats	Norma Heigham	398	15.48	▼32.13
Liberal Democrats	Merlin Milner	368		
Liberal Democrats	Kay Stone	361		
Green	Nicholas Lee	219	9.02	▼3.10
Registered electors		6,130		▼928
Turnout		2,496	40.72	▲0.18
Rejected ballots		9	0.36	▲0.15
Labour hold				
Labour gain from Conservative				
Labour gain from Conservative				

=== Eastdown ===
Eastdown (3)
Party	Candidate	Votes	%	±%
Labour	Linda Hibberd*	1,510	82.08	▼0.18
Labour	Laz Oleforo	1,328		
Labour	Shuja Shaikh*	1,299		
Conservative	Lilian Lonsdale	371	17.92	▲0.18
Conservative	Grace Foresythe	286		
Conservative	Peter Lonsdale	247		
Registered electors		5,927		▼823
Turnout		1,874	31.62	▲1.81
Rejected ballots		21	1.12	▲0.28
Labour hold				
Labour hold				
Labour hold				

=== Haggerston ===
Haggerston (2)
Party	Candidate	Votes	%	±%
Labour	Simon Matthews*	1,032	55.25	▲9.31
Labour	Jeremy Killingray	925		
Liberal Democrats	Colin Beadle*	703	38.32	▼1.34
Liberal Democrats	Justin More	655		
Conservative	Patrick Butler	121	6.43	▼2.76
Conservative	Carole Crawford	106		
Registered electors		4,202		▼496
Turnout		1,908	45.41	▲2.50
Rejected ballots		6	0.31	▲0.01
Labour hold				
Labour gain from Liberal Democrats				

=== Homerton ===
Homerton (2)
Party	Candidate	Votes	%	±%
Labour	Kenrick Hanson*	1,028	64.14	▼10.62
Labour	Sharon Patrick*	953		
Liberal Democrats	Jackie Christie	261	16.31	New
Liberal Democrats	Christine Beadle	243		
Green	Kate de Selincourt	161	10.42	New
Conservative	Elsie Baverstock	155	9.13	▼16.11
Conservative	Clare Crawford	127		
Registered electors		4,567		▼426
Turnout		1,548	33.90	▼2.59
Rejected ballots		5	0.32	▼0.78
Labour hold				
Labour hold				

=== Kings Park ===
Kings Park (2)
Party	Candidate	Votes	%	±%
Labour	Simon Parkes	925	74.94	▲4.95
Labour	Mohammad Siddiqui*	922		
Liberal Democrats	David Bentley	178	14.36	New
Liberal Democrats	David Ash	176		
Conservative	Barbara Campbell	138	10.71	▼19.30
Conservative	Gavin Gardiner	126		
Registered electors		3,920		▼925
Turnout		1,318	33.62	▲2.80
Rejected ballots		2	0.15	▼0.65
Labour hold				
Labour hold				

=== Leabridge ===
Leabridge (3)
Party	Candidate	Votes	%	±%
Labour	Christopher Bryant* (Note: Bryant replaced Cllr Andrew Buttress after his resignation in 1993)	1,252	52.94	▼7.26
Labour	Jane Reeves*	1,208		
Labour	Jacob Grosskopf	1,136		
Conservative	Asif Patel	654	26.09	▲7.05
Conservative	Heather Whitelaw	598		
Conservative	Maureen Middleton	521		
Green	Ian Busby	259	11.43	▼9.33
Liberal Democrats	Christopher Noyes	224	9.54	New
Liberal Democrats	Carol Hartwell	220		
Liberal Democrats	Simon Taylor	204		
Registered electors		6,111		▼348
Turnout		2,319	37.95	▲0.99
Rejected ballots		9	0.39	▲0.10
Labour hold				
Labour hold				
Labour hold				

=== Moorfields ===
Moorfields (2)
Party	Candidate	Votes	%	±%
Liberal Democrats	Iain Pigg	915	61.73	▼4.56
Liberal Democrats	Alison Rothwell	901		
Labour	Richard Black	431	28.69	▲1.54
Labour	Keith Meredith	413		
Conservative	Robert Brooks	145	9.59	▲3.03
Conservative	Gloria Alake	137		
Registered electors		4,300		▼672
Turnout		1,634	38.00	▲1.03
Rejected ballots		7	0.43	▲0.05
Liberal Democrats hold				
Liberal Democrats hold				

=== New River ===
New River (3)
Party	Candidate	Votes	%	±%
Labour	Bernard Peretz	1,701	57.06	▲15.06
Labour	Michael Desmond*	1,427		
Labour	David Phillips	1,382		
Conservative	Bernard Aussenberg*	1,096	34.43	▼6.46
Conservative	Leslie Stoners	928		
Conservative	Cozens Braide	697		
Liberal Democrats	Michael Moseley	250	8.50	▼0.92
Liberal Democrats	Mark Smulian	198		
Registered electors		6,529		▼834
Turnout		2,772	42.46	▼0.20
Rejected ballots		10	0.36	▲0.07
Labour hold				
Labour hold				
Labour gain from Conservative				

=== North Defoe ===
North Defoe (2)
Party	Candidate	Votes	%	±%
Labour	John Burnell*	1,027	67.83	▲6.95
Labour	Brian Marsh^{†} (Note: Marsh was a sitting councillor representing the Dalston ward)	912		
Green	Misha-Anna Borris	267	18.25	▼4.10
Green	Yen Chong	255		
Conservative	Michael Donoghue	205	13.92	▼2.85
Conservative	Ann McGinley	192		
Registered electors		3,621		▼159
Turnout		1,514	41.81	▼1.39
Rejected ballots		6	0.40	▲0.09
Labour hold				
Labour hold				

=== Northfield ===
Northfield (3)
Party	Candidate	Votes	%	±%
Conservative	Shabsy Lipschitz	1,291	50.24	▲22.40
Conservative	Medlin Lewis	1,234		
Conservative	Christopher Sills	1,172		
Labour	Denise Robson* (Note: Robson replaced Cllr Jane Linden after her resignation in 1991)	1,085	40.66	▼14.88
Labour	Hubert Adams	997		
Labour	Harold Shaw^{†} (Note: Shaw was a sitting councillor representing the Wick ward)	910		
Green	Vicky Olliver	223	9.09	▼7.53
Registered electors		5,698		▼671
Turnout		2,476	43.45	▲11.39
Rejected ballots		4	0.16	▼0.28
Conservative gain from Labour				
Conservative gain from Labour				
Conservative gain from Labour				

=== Northwold ===
Northwold (3)
Party	Candidate	Votes	%	±%
Labour	Isaac Leibowitz* (Note: Leibowitz was elected alongside Ian Leask to replace Cllrs Paul Foley and Francis Reedy after their resignations)	1,366	60.86	▲1.96
Labour	Ian Sharer	1,330		
Labour	Cynthia O-Garrow	1,236		
Conservative	Ellen McCarthy	508	22.14	▲1.81
Conservative	Ismail Omerji	468		
Conservative	Andrew S Sloan	456		
Green	Paul Thomas	366	16.99	▼4.07
Registered electors		5,906		▼546
Turnout		2,112	35.76	▲2.56
Rejected ballots		13	0.62	▲0.39
Labour hold				
Labour hold				
Labour gain from Conservative				

=== Queensbridge ===
Queensbridge (3)
Party	Candidate	Votes	%	±%
Labour	Anthony Allen* (Note: Allen replaced Cllr Jean Khote after their resignation in 1991)	1,447	53.75	▲6.31
Labour	Hetty Peters	1,404		
Labour	Peter Watson*	1,388		
Liberal Democrats	Irene Fawkes	986	36.82	▲1.99
Liberal Democrats	Michael McNulty	966		
Liberal Democrats	Atique Choudhury	953		
Conservative	Victoria Gardiner	268	9.43	▲2.18
Conservative	Gregory Alake	263		
Conservative	Mohammad Kaiserimam	214		
Registered electors		6,729		▼772
Turnout		2,758	40.99	▲4.97
Rejected ballots		4	0.15	▲0.08
Labour hold				
Labour hold				
Labour hold				

=== Rectory ===
Rectory (3)
Party	Candidate	Votes	%	±%
Labour	Jeshuran Lamb*	1,540	87.77	▲25.36
Labour	John McCafferty*	1,540		
Labour	Gerald Ross^{†} (Note: Ross was a sitting councillor representing the Wick ward)	1,462		
Conservative	Coral Meadows	260	12.23	▼0.82
Conservative	Ahmed Mehter	187		
Conservative	Fatima Mehter	185		
Registered electors		6,010		▼589
Turnout		1,969	32.76	▼0.05
Rejected ballots		20	1.02	▲0.65
Labour hold				
Labour hold				
Labour hold				

=== South Defoe ===
South Defoe (3)
Party	Candidate	Votes	%	±%
Labour	Anne Miller*	969	68.28	▼3.79
Labour	Patrick Corrigan*	860		
Green	Peter Mennim	264	19.70	▲0.65
Conservative	Caroline Fazzani	166	12.01	▼4.45
Conservative	John Parker	156		
Registered electors		3,809		▼339
Turnout		1,287	33.79	▼2.42
Rejected ballots		6	0.47	▼0.34
Labour hold				
Labour hold				

=== Springfield ===
Springfield (3)
Party	Candidate	Votes	%	±%
Conservative	Josef Lobenstein*	1,619	53.43	▲3.17
Conservative	Eric Ollerenshaw*	1,468		
Conservative	David Harmer	1,450		
Labour	Dennis Sawyerr	1,139	39.96	▼2.51
Labour	Gordon McIntosh	1,129		
Labour	Paul Wilkins	1,124		
Communist	Monty Goldman	187	6.61	New
Registered electors		6,763		▲17
Turnout		2,929	43.31	▲0.94
Rejected ballots		11	0.38	Steady
Conservative hold				
Conservative hold				
Conservative hold				

=== Victoria ===
Victoria (3)
Party	Candidate	Votes	%	±%
Liberal Democrats	Catherine Courtney	1,332	48.35	▲26.97
Liberal Democrats	Howard Hyman* (Note: Hyman replaced Cllr Ali Uddin after their disqualification in 1991)	1,300		
Liberal Democrats	Celya Maxted	1,233		
Labour	Mavis McCallum^{†} (Note: McCallum was a sitting councillor representing the Northwold ward)	1,214	44.63	▼3.00
Labour	Lewis Goldberg*	1,213		
Labour	Abdul Mulla^{†} (Note: Mulla was a sitting councillor representing the Leabridge ward)	1,140		
Conservative	Gavin Gardiner	213	7.02	▼7.23
Conservative	Marion Desmond	196		
Conservative	Nick Tang	153		
Registered electors		7,003		▼1,000
Turnout		2,867	40.94	▲7.23
Rejected ballots		10	0.35	▲0.02
Liberal Democrats gain from Labour				
Liberal Democrats gain from Labour				
Liberal Democrats hold				

=== Wenlock ===
Wenlock (2)
Party	Candidate	Votes	%	±%
Liberal Democrats	Valerie Carlow*	1,110	63.39	▼6.77
Liberal Democrats	Kevin Daws	1,043		
Labour	Janet Burnell	504	28.49	▲6.50
Labour	David Harry	463		
Conservative	Hilda Chapman	151	8.12	▲3.44
Conservative	Anthony Macdonald	125		
Registered electors		4,468		▼594
Turnout		1,774	39.70	▼6.53
Rejected ballots		3	0.17	▲0.04
Liberal Democrats hold				
Liberal Democrats hold				

=== Westdown ===
Westdown (2)
Party	Candidate	Votes	%	±%
Labour	Julie Grimble	902	85.21	▲0.68
Labour	William Leadbitter	849		
Conservative	John Campbell	161	14.79	▼0.68
Conservative	Donald Ridealgh	142		
Registered electors		3,323		▲404
Turnout		1,140	34.31	▲4.58
Rejected ballots		16	1.40	▲0.86
Labour hold				
Labour hold				

=== Wick ===
Wick (3)
Party	Candidate	Votes	%	±%
Liberal Democrats	Peter Hoye* (Note: Hoye replaced Cllr Georgina Nicholas after her resignation in 1992)	1,411	47.76	▼26.38
Liberal Democrats	Adrian Frost	1,332		
Liberal Democrats	Keith Steventon	1,218		
Labour	Mary Browning	1,143	38.13	▼3.00
Labour	Samantha Lloyd	1,077		
Labour	John Small	943		
Conservative	Elizabeth Mellen	230	8.14	▼7.23
Conservative	Roger Durowse	224		
Conservative	Christopher O'Leary	221		
Green	Brenda Puech	165	5.97	▼12.58
Registered electors		7,003		▼1,000
Turnout		2,867	40.94	▲7.23
Rejected ballots		10	0.35	▲0.02
Liberal Democrats gain from Labour				
Liberal Democrats gain from Labour				
Liberal Democrats hold				
