= 1990 Hackney London Borough Council election =

1990 local election in England

← 1986	3 May 1990	1994 →

All 60 seats up for election to Hackney London Borough Council 31 seats needed for a majority
- Registered: 137,190
- Turnout: 49,499, 36.08%
	First party	Second party
Party	Labour	Liberal Democrats
Seats before	51	5
Seats won	48 (Note: results include those from Gerald Ross who listed himself under Labour and Co-operative Party)	8
Seat change	▼3	▲3
Popular vote	66,979	18,921
Percentage	55.87%	15.78%
	Third party	Fourth party
Party	Conservative	Green
Seats before	4	0
Seats won	4	0
Seat change	Steady	Steady
Popular vote	27,684	6,192
Percentage	23.09%	5.17%
Council control before election
Labour
Council control after election
Labour

The 1990 Hackney Council election took place on 3 May 1990 to elect members of Hackney London Borough Council in London, England. The whole council was up for election and the council remained controlled by Labour.

== Election results ==
1990 Hackney London Borough Council elections
Party	Seats	Gains	Losses	Net gain/loss	Seats %	Votes %	Votes	+/−
Labour	48	2	5	▼3	80.00	55.87	66,979	
Liberal Democrats	8	4	1	▲3	13.33	15.78	18,921	
Conservative	4	1	1	Steady	6.67	23.09	27,684	
Green	0	0	0	Steady	0.00	5.17	6,192	
Communist	0	0	0	Steady	0.00	0.08	101	
Total	60						119,877	

== Ward Results ==
(*) - indicates an incumbent candidate

(†) - Indicates an incumbent candidate that is standing in a different ward

=== Bronswood ===
Brownswood (2)
Party	Candidate	Votes	%
Labour	Clancy Etienne	968	52.08
Labour	Lois Radice^{†} (Note: Radice was a sitting councillor for the Clissold ward, a seat she won after the resignation of Cllr. Philip Stott in 1988)	963	
Conservative	Joseph Michael	483	26.04
Conservative	Sushil K. Vig	483	
Green	Suzanne V. Bosworth	264	14.23
Liberal Democrats	Emma T. Hutchinson	153	7.65
Liberal Democrats	Julie Hutchinson	131	
Registered electors		5,518	
Turnout		1,846	33.45
Rejected ballots		2	0.11
Labour hold			
Labour hold			

=== Chatham ===
Chatham (3)
Party	Candidate	Votes	%
Labour	Foster Akusu* (Note: Akusu replaced Cllr. James Holland after his resignation in 1988)	1,101	49.47
Labour	Tom Silverlock	1,079	
Labour	Jacob A. Siaw	1,008	
Conservative	Dorothy Lyons	689	30.71
Conservative	Anne L. M. Hamilton Bruce	660	
Conservative	Ian D. Leask	632	
Green	Tomasina M. M. Morahan	426	19.82
Registered electors		6,394	
Turnout		2,217	34.67
Rejected ballots		4	0.18
Labour hold			
Labour hold			
Labour hold			

=== Clissold ===
Clissold (3)
Party	Candidate	Votes	%
Labour	Christine Callum*	1,641	76.83
Labour	Medlin Lewis^{†} (Note: Lewis was a sitting councillor for the Victoria ward)	1,557	
Labour	William D. O'Connor	1,459	
Conservative	George F. Mills	482	23.17
Conservative	Helen Mills	468	
Conservative	Philip McCullough	454	
Registered electors		6,941	
Turnout		2,281	32.86
Rejected ballots		32	1.40
Labour hold			
Labour hold			
Labour hold			

=== Dalston ===
Dalston (3)
Party	Candidate	Votes	%
Labour	Brian N. Marsh*	1,108	47.12
Labour	Nicholas K. Tallentire	1,034	
Labour	Mameisia Margai	1,030	
Green	Jack E. Easton	495	22.07
Conservative	Moira Gardiner	389	16.10
Liberal Democrats	Deborah Harrison	366	14.71
Conservative	Gregory A. Alake	358	
Conservative	Desmond Londt	335	
Liberal Democrats	Lily West	293	
Registered electors		6,027	
Turnout		2,054	34.08
Rejected ballots		3	0.15
Labour hold			
Labour hold			
Labour hold			

=== De Beauvoir ===
De Beauvoir (3)
Party	Candidate	Votes	%
Liberal Democrats	Thomas A. Brake* (Note: Brake replaced Cllr. John A. Lettice after he resigned in 1988)	1,461	47.61
Liberal Democrats	Pauline Kerridge-Smith	1,317	
Liberal Democrats	John T. T. Richards	1,287	
Labour	David Greene	990	31.48
Labour	James Warner	903	
Labour	Adu Seray-Wurie	794	
Green	Nicholas G. Lee	345	12.12
Conservative	Glenda J. Aussenberg	261	8.78
Conservative	Rosemary M. Pender	250	
Conservative	Anthony C. Whitehorn	239	
Registered electors		7,058	
Turnout		2,861	40.54
Rejected ballots		6	0.21
Liberal Democrats hold			
Liberal Democrats gain from Labour			
Liberal Democrats gain from Labour			

=== Eastdown ===
Eastdown (3)
Party	Candidate	Votes	%
Labour	Linda A. Hibberd*	1,592	82.26
Labour	Campbell R.McK. Matheson	1,442	
Labour	Shuja Shaikh*	1,429	
Conservative	Richard W. Gregory	331	17.74
Conservative	Lilian Lonsdale	326	
Conservative	Peter Lonsdale	306	
Registered electors		6,750	
Turnout		2,012	29.81
Rejected ballots		17	0.84
Labour hold			
Labour hold			
Labour hold			

=== Haggerston ===
Haggerston (2)
Party	Candidate	Votes	%
Labour	Simon Matthews* (Note: Matthews replaced Cllr. Andrew Elder after his resignation in 1987)	956	45.94
Liberal Democrats	Colin Beadle* (Note: Beadle replaced Cllr. William J. Upex after his resignation in 1989)	798	39.66
Labour	Denise M. Robson	754	
Liberal Democrats	Jacqueline Sanderson	678	
Conservative	Maria A. Murray	182	9.19
Conservative	Harold Symons	160	
Green	Simon K. Markson	97	5.21
Registered electors		4,698	
Turnout		2,016	42.91
Rejected ballots		6	0.30
Labour hold			
Liberal Democrats hold			

=== Homerton ===
Homerton (2)
Party	Candidate	Votes	%
Labour	Kenrick E. Hanson*	1,314	74.76
Labour	Sharon Patrick^{†} (Note: Patrick was a sitting councillor for the Rectory ward, a seat he won alongside James Macfoy after the resignations of Cllr. Felicity Harvest and Cllr. Anthony Horrocks in 1988)	1,216	
Conservative	Julian Eagle	444	25.24
Conservative	Patrick Pender	409	
Registered electors		4,993	
Turnout		1,822	36.49
Rejected ballots		20	1.10
Labour hold			
Labour hold			

=== Kings Park ===
Kings Park (2)
Party	Candidate	Votes	%
Labour	Martin J. O'Connor	1,012	69.99
Labour	Mohammad S. Siddiqui	899	
Conservative	Joan Mertens	431	30.01
Conservative	Stephen Mertens	389	
Registered electors		4,845	
Turnout		1,493	30.82
Rejected ballots		12	0.80
Labour hold			
Labour hold			

=== Leabridge ===
Leabridge (3)
Party	Candidate	Votes	%
Labour	Jane F. Reeves	1,362	60.20
Labour	Andrew S. Buttress	1,340	
Labour	Abdul G. Mulla*	1,301	
Green	David J. Fitzpatrick	482	20.76
Conservative	Gerard V. Bulger	457	19.04
Conservative	Elsie M. Baverstock	439	
Green	Rowena Field	437	
Conservative	Edith G. Finnie	369	
Registered electors		6,459	
Turnout		2,387	36.96
Rejected ballots		7	0.29
Labour hold			
Labour hold			
Labour hold			

=== Moorfields ===
Moorfields (2)
Party	Candidate	Votes	%
Liberal Democrats	Luke J. Maughan-Pawsey* (Note: Maughan-Pawsey replaced Pierre S. Royan after his disqualification in 1988)	1,117	66.29
Liberal Democrats	George Wintle*	1,104	
Labour	Edith Edwards	512	27.15
Labour	Rosina Lowe	398	
Conservative	Valerie A. Brown	119	6.56
Conservative	Angela Kilmartin	101	
Registered electors		4,972	
Turnout		1,838	36.97
Rejected ballots		7	0.38
Liberal Democrats hold			
Liberal Democrats hold			

=== New River ===
New River (3)
Party	Candidate	Votes	%
Labour	Michael B. Desmond	1,326	42.00
Labour	Mark A. Williams	1,321	
Conservative	Bernard Aussenberg*	1,317	40.89
Labour	Julia J. M. Rizzolo	1,302	
Conservative	Ian A. Kleinberg	1,264	
Conservative	Christopher D. Sills*	1,263	
Liberal Democrats	Maurice S. Owen	301	9.42
Liberal Democrats	Zalkind Y. Wise	301	
Liberal Democrats	David J. Collins	284	
Green	Derek B. Moir	241	7.69
Registered electors		7,363	
Turnout		3,141	42.66
Rejected ballots		9	0.29
Labour hold			
Labour gain from Conservative			
Conservative hold			

=== North Defoe ===
North Defoe (2)
Party	Candidate	Votes	%
Labour	John B. Burnell	1,049	60.88
Labour	Tommy Sheppard^{†} (Note: Sheppard was a sitting councillor for the Clissold ward)	1,004	
Green	Yen-Chit Chong	377	22.35
Conservative	Ann V. McGinley	289	16.77
Conservative	Pamela Y. Sills	276	
Registered electors		3,780	
Turnout		1,633	43.20
Rejected ballots		5	0.31
Labour hold			
Labour hold			

=== Northfield ===
Northfield (3)
Party	Candidate	Votes	%
Labour	Abraham Lew^{†} (Note: Lew was a sitting councillor for the Springfield ward. He won that seat after the resignation of Cllr. Edward C. Barns in 1988)	1,166	55.54
Labour	Anthony Goodchild	1,105	
Labour	Jane Linden	1,097	
Conservative	Rodney B. Coleman	633	27.84
Conservative	Michael J. Donaghue	572	
Conservative	Timothey J. D. Richardson	485	
Green	Jose A. Martin	336	16.62
Registered electors		6,369	
Turnout		2,042	32.06
Rejected ballots		9	0.44
Labour hold			
Labour hold			
Labour hold			

=== Northwold ===
Northwold (3)
Party	Candidate	Votes	%
Labour	Paul Foley* (Note: Foley was elected following the resignation of Cllr. Peter D.J. Chowney)	1,277	58.90
Labour	Mavis McCallum^{†} (Note: Mavis was a sitting councillor for the Leabridge ward)	1,214	
Labour	Francis P. Reedy	1,112	
Conservative	Henreid Kasselman	420	20.33
Conservative	Eileen Baldock	416	
Conservative	Gavin M. Harris	408	
Green	Mahmood Bham	273	12.92
Green	Clara Slater	254	
Liberal Democrats	Stanley Kinn	184	7.85
Liberal Democrats	Nicholas E. Bridges	148	
Liberal Democrats	Howard Hyman	148	
Registered electors		6,452	
Turnout		2,142	33.20
Rejected ballots		5	0.23
Labour hold			
Labour hold			
Labour hold			

=== Queensbridge ===
Queensbridge (3)
Party	Candidate	Votes	%
Labour	John R. B. Drummond	1,307	47.44
Labour	Peter W. J. Watson^{†} (Note: Watson was a sitting councillor for the Wick ward)	1,219	
Labour	Jean Khote^{†} (Note: Khote was a sitting councillor for the Northwold ward)	1,196	
Liberal Democrats	David R. Green	914	34.83
Liberal Democrats	Susan Bridges	911	
Liberal Democrats	Christine A. Beadle	907	
Green	Charles L. Acton	274	10.48
Conservative	Iris Hone	194	7.25
Conservative	June Pipe	192	
Conservative	William Hone	183	
Registered electors		7,501	
Turnout		2,702	36.02
Rejected ballots		2	0.07
Labour hold			
Labour hold			
Labour hold			

=== Rectory ===
Rectory (3)
Party	Candidate	Votes	%
Labour	John A. McCafferty*	1,413	62.41
Labour	Jeshuran Lamb	1,365	
Labour	James J. N. Macfoy*	1,295	
Green	Christine M. Taig	371	17.05
Conservative	Joan Hillier	307	13.05
Conservative	Coral J. Meadows	296	
Conservative	James K. Tawaih	250	
Liberal Democrats	Jane L. Crosby	175	7.49
Liberal Democrats	Giles Turner	172	
Liberal Democrats	Katherine Wolfe	142	
Registered electors		6,599	
Turnout		2,165	32.81
Rejected ballots		8	0.37
Labour hold			
Labour hold			
Labour hold			

=== South Defoe ===
South Defoe (2)
Party	Candidate	Votes	%
Labour	Anne St Clair Miller	986	64.49
Labour	Patrick J. Corrigan*	950	
Green	Mischa-Anna Borris	286	19.05
Conservative	Ann B. M. Brenells	263	16.46
Conservative	Paul Brenells	230	
Registered electors		4,148	
Turnout		1,502	36.21
Rejected ballots		2	0.13
Labour hold			
Labour hold			

=== Springfield ===
Springfield (3)
Party	Candidate	Votes	%
Conservative	Josef H. Lobenstein*	1,475	50.26
Conservative	Adrian P. Burbanks	1,267	
Conservative	Eric Ollerenshaw	1,262	
Labour	Gordon McIntosh	1,139	42.47
Labour	Kort Robinson	1,128	
Labour	Dele Ojo	1,118	
Liberal Democrats	David R. Ash	195	7.27
Liberal Democrats	Barry J. King	195	
Liberal Democrats	Michael Moseley	188	
Registered electors		6,746	
Turnout		2,858	42.37
Rejected ballots		11	0.38
Conservative hold			
Conservative gain from Labour			
Conservative hold			

=== Victoria ===
Victoria (3)
Party	Candidate	Votes	%
Labour	David A. Bell	1,306	41.13
Labour	Lewis Goldberg	1,188	
Labour	Ali M. B. Uddin	997	
Liberal Democrats	Elizabeth K. Balfour	708	21.38
Liberal Democrats	Sarah G. Turner	569	
Liberal Democrats	Mark N. Smulian	539	
Green	Leonard Lucas	525	18.55
Conservative	Derek Mahoney	482	15.37
Conservative	Cheuk C. Tang	414	
Conservative	Michael Trend	409	
Communist	Patricia F. Turnbull	101	3.57
Registered electors		8,003	
Turnout		2,698	33.71
Rejected ballots		9	0.33
Labour hold			
Labour hold			
Labour hold			

=== Wenlock ===
Wenlock (2)
Party	Candidate	Votes	%
Liberal Democrats	Gillian Moseley* (Note: Moseley replaced Cllr. J.D. Roberts after he resigned in 1987)	1,641	70.16
Liberal Democrats	Valerie L. Carlow	1,594	
Labour	John F. J. Bloom (Note: Bloom was originally a sitting councillor for the Westdown ward, but he resigned in 1989)	546	21.99
Labour	Momodu Sillah	467	
Conservative	Hilda Chapman	112	4.68
Conservative	Gloria I. Alake	103	
Green	David R. Cuthbertson	73	3.17
Registered electors		5,062	
Turnout		2,340	46.23
Rejected ballots		3	0.13
Liberal Democrats hold			
Liberal Democrats gain from Labour			

=== Westdown ===
Westdown (2)
Party	Candidate	Votes	%
Labour	Jan Burnell* (Note: Burnell replaced Cllr. Lloyd King after he resigned in 1989)	856	84.53
Labour	Jonathan Slater* (Note: Slater replaced Cllr. John F.J. Bloom after he resigned in 1989)	815	
Conservative	Kehinde Aromire	167	15.47
Conservative	Minnie Howland	139	
Registered electors		3,727	
Turnout		1,108	29.73
Rejected ballots		6	0.54
Labour hold			
Labour hold			

=== Wick ===
Wick (3)
Party	Candidate	Votes	%
Labour	Georgina M. C. Nicholas	1,247	47.93
Labour	Harold Shaw	1,190	
Labour Co-op	Gerald Ross	1,116	
Conservative	Michelle D. Hart	685	26.32
Conservative	Agnes Thompson	652	
Green	Simon Jamieson	636	25.75
Conservative	Janet Londt	613	
Registered electors		6,785	
Turnout		2,341	34.50
Rejected ballots		10	0.43
Labour hold			
Labour hold			
Labour Co-op hold			
