= 1998 Hackney London Borough Council election =

Local election in England

1998 Hackney London Borough Council elections
- 7 May 1998

All 60 seats up for election to Hackney London Borough Council 31 seats needed for a majority
- Registered: 116,157
- Turnout: 40,385, 34.77% (▼3.47)

	First party	Second party
Party	Labour	Liberal Democrats
Last election	44 seats, 56.37%	10 seats, 19.15%
Seats before	24 (Note: 16 councillors defected to other parties, 2 seats were lost in by-elections and 2 seats were vacant)	17 (Note: 9 councillors defected to the Liberal Democrats, they lost 1 seat in a by-election and 1 seat was vacant)
Seats won	29	17
Seat change	▼15	▲7
Popular vote	43,541	27,307
Percentage	48.33%	28.33%
Swing	▼12.29	▲8.49
	Third party	Fourth party
Party	Conservative	Green
Last election	6 seats, 22.16%	0 seats, 2.16%
Seats before	15 (Note: 6 councillors defected to the Conservatives and they won 3 seats in by-elections)	0
Seats won	12	2
Seat change	▲6	▲2
Popular vote	22,447	4,320
Percentage	22.73%	4.37%
Swing	▲0.57	▲2.21
Council control before election
No Overall Control
Council control after election
No Overall Control

The 1998 Hackney London Borough Council election took place on 7 May 1998. All 60 members of Hackney London Borough Council were up for election. The elections took place as part of the 1998 London local elections.

The Labour Party remained the largest party, winning 29 seats, but lost its overall majority, losing 16 seats.. The Liberal Democrats won 17 seats, the Conservatives won 12 and the Green Party of England and Wales won two. The result left the council under no overall control.

The Labour Party saw a significant reduction in seats, losing 16 seats. The Liberal Democrats and the Conservatives made gains, with the Liberal Democrats increasing their seat count by 10, the Conservatives by six, and the Green Party by two.

Simultaneously, a referendum was held on whether there was support for establishing a Greater London Authority.

The 1998 Hackney London Borough Council elections initially left the Labour Party without a working majority, holding 29 of the 60 available seats. Following a series of by-elections, Labour gained three additional seats, securing victories from both the Liberal Democrats and the Green Party, and thus achieving a working majority with 32 seats. The Liberal Democrats saw a reduction from 17 to 15 seats, while the Conservative Party increased their seats from 12 to 13, and the Green Party's representation decreased from 2 to 1 seat. This shift in council composition allowed Labour to establish stronger control over council decisions, including budgetary matters.

== Background ==
Prior to the 1998 election, Labour had effectively lost control of Hackney Council, with no single party holding a majority. The election was part of a broader set of local elections across London and the UK, where several councils experienced shifts in control.

== Electoral fraud ==
On 9 March 2001, two Hackney Borough Council councillors, Isaac Leibowitz, Conservative, and Zev Lieberman, Liberal Democrat were convicted of a major vote-rigging conspiracy related to the May 1998 local elections. They were found guilty of fraudulently adding names to the electoral roll to influence the election outcome in Hackney's Northwold ward.

The fraud involved registering fake voters, including using disused properties and misrepresenting addresses. It also included manipulating proxy votes. This led to a significant increase in proxy voting from 12 in 1994 to 241 in 1998, with a majority of the proxies voting for the Liberal Democrats.

Leibowitz and Lieberman were convicted of forgery and conspiracy to defraud. The scale of the fraud raised concerns about the integrity of the electoral process and the accuracy of the election results.

== Election result ==
In the 1998 Hackney Council election, no single party gained overall control of the council. The result reflected a broader trend observed in other boroughs during the same election cycle, where several councils transitioned to no overall control. The outcome was consistent with changes observed in other boroughs, where Labour gained control of Harrow, Brent, Lambeth, and Waltham Forest from a state of no overall control. Labour lost control of Hillingdon, Islington, and Hackney, where they had previously held a majority or significant influence.

1998 Hackney London Borough Council local elections
Party	Seats	Gains	Losses	Net gain/loss	Seats %	Votes %	Votes	+/−
Labour	29	0	15	▼15	48.33	44.08	43,541	▼12.29
Liberal Democrats	17	9	2	▲7	28.33	27.64	27,307	▲8.49
Conservative	12	6	0	▲6	20.00	22.73	22,447	▲0.57
Green	2	2	0	▲2	3.33	4.37	4,320	▲2.21
Socialist Labour	0	0	0	Steady	0.00	0.60	590	New
Socialist (GB)	0	0	0	Steady	0.00	0.18	179	New
BNP	0	0	0	Steady	0.00	0.16	154	New
Socialist Alliance/Communist Party	0	0	0	Steady	0.00	0.13	131	New
Communist	0	0	0	Steady	0.00	0.09	92	▼0.07
Independent	0	0	0	Steady	0.00	0.02	22	New
Total	60						98,783	

== Ward result ==
(*) - Indicates an incumbent candidate

(†) - Indicates an incumbent candidate standing in a different ward

=== Brownswood ===
Brownswood (2)
Party	Candidate	Votes	%	±%
Labour	Peter Kenyon*	855	56.83	▼18.86
Labour	Linda Smith	714		
Liberal Democrats	Joyce Alexander	233	15.61	New
Green	Klaus Graichen	226	16.37	New
Liberal Democrats	Mark Smulian	198		
Conservative	Joan Hillier	156	11.19	▼13.12
Conservative	Irene Lewington	153		
Registered electors		5,013		▲3
Turnout		1,405	28.03	▼5.20
Rejected ballots		14	1.00	▼0.02
Labour hold				
Labour hold				

=== Chatham ===
Chatham (3)
Party	Candidate	Votes	%	±%
Labour	Ian Darbyshire	924	58.86	▲4.00
Labour	Naomi Russell	893		
Labour	Sally Mulready	862		
Liberal Democrats	Maryam Hafezji	396	25.33	▼0.96
Liberal Democrats	Menachem Beitél	387		
Liberal Democrats	Mark Ukandu	370		
Conservative	Elsie Baverstock	182	9.91	▼8.94
Conservative	Stephen Giff	145		
Conservative	Alfred Suskin	124		
Socialist (GB)	Paul Heron	109	5.90	New
Socialist (GB)	Christian Newby	70		
Registered electors		5,576		▼129
Turnout		1,676	30.06	▼4.94
Rejected ballots		24	1.43	▲1.08
Labour hold				
Labour hold				
Labour hold				

=== Clissold ===
Clissold (3)
Party	Candidate	Votes	%	±%
Labour	Lorraine Monk	937	41.08	▼17.21
Labour	John Hudson	916		
Liberal Democrats	Sylvia Anderson	814	32.48	▲18.74
Labour	Brian Marsh^{†} (Note: Marsh was a sitting councillor representing the North Defoe ward)	776		
Liberal Democrats	David Mackey	669		
Liberal Democrats	Abraham-Samuel Jacobson	596		
Green	Ian Wingrove	457	21.42	▲4.79
Conservative	June Eaton	114	5.02	▼6.32
Conservative	David Balcombe	111		
Conservative	John Moir	96		
Registered electors		5,992		▼273
Turnout		2,043	34.10	▼0.35
Rejected ballots		20	0.98	▲0.61
Labour hold				
Labour hold				
Liberal Democrats gain from Labour				

=== Dalston ===
Dalston (3)
Party	Candidate	Votes	%	±%
Liberal Democrats	David Bentley* (Note: Bentley was elected in a by-election triggered by the resignation of Cllr Helen Cooper)	1,055	46.01	▲24.87
Liberal Democrats	Philip Pearson* (Note: Pearson was initially elected as a Labour Councillor but later joined the Liberal Democrats)	937		
Liberal Democrats	Meral Ece^{†} (Note: Ece was a sitting councillor representing the Clissold ward. They were originally elected as a Labour councillor but defected to the Liberal Democrats at some point before this election)	838		
Labour	Fiona Alderton	809	38.07	▼22.22
Labour	Samantha Lloyd	770		
Labour	Richard Blanco	763		
Green	Jack Easton	239	11.66	New
Conservative	Christopher Ballingall	122	4.26	▼14.31
Conservative	David Harmer^{†} (Note: Harmer was a sitting councillor representing the Springfield ward)	72		
Conservative	Winston Henry	68		
Registered electors		5,401		▲33
Turnout		2,094	38.77	▲1.49
Rejected ballots		12	0.57	▲0.42
Liberal Democrats gain from Labour				
Liberal Democrats gain from Labour				
Liberal Democrats gain from Labour				

=== De Beauvoir ===
De Beauvoir (3)
Party	Candidate	Votes	%	±%
Conservative	Christopher O'Leary* (Note: O'Leary was elected in a by-election triggered by the resignation of Cllr John Richards in 1994)	997	42.44	▲6.75
Labour	Andrew Windross	942	42.47	▲2.66
Labour	Frances Pearson	929		
Labour	Peter Snell* (Note: Snell was elected in a by-election triggered by the resignation of Cllr Madeleine M. Spanswick in 1996)	891		
Conservative	James Spencer	886		
Conservative	Alexander Ellis	877		
Liberal Democrats	John Bird	402	15.09	▼0.39
Liberal Democrats	Irene Fawkes	316		
Liberal Democrats	Edward Garber	264		
Registered electors		5,921		▼209
Turnout		2,336	39.45	▼1.27
Rejected ballots		9	0.39	▲0.03
Conservative gain from Labour				
Labour hold				
Labour hold				

=== Eastdown ===
Eastdown (3)
Party	Candidate	Votes	%	±%
Labour	Patrick Corrigan	803	50.77	▼31.31
Labour	Bharti Patel	702		
Labour	Stephen Sartain	696		
Liberal Democrats	Linda Hibberd* (Note: Hibberd was originally elected as a Labour councillor but defected to the Liberal Democrats at some point before this election)	666	43.14	New
Liberal Democrats	Kenrick Hanson^{†} (Note: Hanson was a sitting councillor representing the Homerton ward who was originally elected as a Labour councillor but defected to the Liberal Democrats at some point before this election)	610		
Liberal Democrats	Paula Grainger	594		
Conservative	Lilian Lonsdale	110	6.09	▼11.83
Conservative	Peter Lonsdale	82		
Conservative	Pamela Sills	72		
Registered electors		5,135		▼792
Turnout		1,622	31.59	▼0.03
Rejected ballots		27	1.66	▲0.54
Labour hold				
Labour hold				
Labour hold				

=== Haggerston ===
Haggerston (2)
Party	Candidate	Votes	%	±%
Labour	William Nicholson	731	45.10	▼10.15
Labour	David Young	668		
Liberal Democrats	Anthony Goodchild^{†} (Note: Goodchild was elected as a Labour councillor but at sometime before this election they defected to the Liberal Democrats)	561	33.82	▼4.50
Liberal Democrats	Mark Pursey	488		
Conservative	Andrew Boff	348	21.08	▲14.65
Conservative	Bruce Spenser	306		
Registered electors		4,240		▲38
Turnout		1,708	40.28	▼5.13
Rejected ballots		27	1.58	▲1.27
Labour hold				
Labour hold				

=== Homerton ===
Homerton (2)
Party	Candidate	Votes	%	±%
Labour	Sharon Patrick*	641	49.40	▼14.74
Labour	Robin Cornell	545		
Liberal Democrats	Celya Maxted^{†} (Note: Maxted was a sitting councillor representing the Victoria ward)	194	15.99	▼0.32
Liberal Democrats	Melvin Minter	190		
Green	Michael Walsh	172	14.33	▲3.91
Socialist Labour	Robert Adams	139	11.58	New
Conservative	Julia Cole	114	8.70	▼0.43
Conservative	Martin Summers	95		
Registered electors		3,978		▼589
Turnout		1,187	29.84	▼4.06
Rejected ballots		9	0.76	▲0.44
Labour hold				
Labour hold				

=== Kings Park ===
Kings Park (2)
Party	Candidate	Votes	%	±%
Labour	Simon Parkes*	680	85.35	▲10.41
Labour	Mohammad Siddiqui*	672		
Conservative	Hyman Kern	136	14.65	▲3.94
Conservative	Giulio Rapaciulo	96		
Registered electors		3,791		▼129
Turnout		907	23.93	▼9.69
Rejected ballots		15	1.65	▲1.50
Labour hold				
Labour hold				

=== Leabridge ===
Leabridge (3)
Party	Candidate	Votes	%	±%
Labour	Bonnie Miller	928	38.11	▼14.83
Labour	Anthony Milton	846		
Labour	Abdul Mulla	757		
Conservative	Heather Whitewall	590	26.53	▲0.44
Conservative	Faruk Miah^{†} (Note: Miah was a sitting councillor representing the Chatham ward. Miah was originally elected as a Labour councillor but defected to the Conservatives at some point before this election.)	587		
Conservative	Shuja Shaikh^{†} (Note: Shaikh was a sitting councillor representing the Eastdown ward who was originally elected as a Labour councillor but later defected to the Conservatives)	585		
Green	Yesin Hussein	299	13.50	▲2.07
Liberal Democrats	Jeffrey Shenker^{†} (Note: Shenker was a sitting councillor representing the Chatham ward. Shenker was originally elected as a Labour councillor but eventually defected to the Conservative Party)	255	11.52	▲1.98
Socialist Labour	Peter Morton	229	10.34	New
Registered electors		5,657		▼454
Turnout		1,924	34.01	▼3.94
Rejected ballots		24	1.25	▲0.86
Labour hold				
Labour hold				
Labour hold				

=== Moorfields ===
Moorfields (2)
Party	Candidate	Votes	%	±%
Conservative	David Candlin* (Note: Candlin was elected in a by-election triggered by the resignation of Cllr Alison Rothwell in 1995)	887	64.69	▲55.10
Conservative	Lorraine Fahey* (Note: Fahey was elected in a by-election triggered by the death of Cllr Iain Pigg in 1997)	830		
Labour	Ian Blunt	349	24.68	▼4.01
Labour	Dylan Jeffery	306		
Liberal Democrats	John Henderson	146	10.63	▼51.10
Liberal Democrats	Tat Kong	136		
Registered electors		4,248		▼52
Turnout		1,428	33.62	▼4.38
Rejected ballots		11	0.77	▲0.34
Conservative gain from Liberal Democrats				
Conservative gain from Liberal Democrats				

=== New River ===
New River (3)
Party	Candidate	Votes	%	±%
Conservative	David Phillips* (Note: Phillips was originally elected as a Labour councillor but later defected to the Conservatives)	1,343	52.49	▼18.06
Conservative	Jacob Grosskopf^{†} (Note: Grosskopf was a sitting councillor representing the Leabridge ward who was originallt elected as a Labour councillor but later defected to the Conservatives)	1,267		
Conservative	Maureen Middleton	1,241		
Labour	Michael Desmond*	941	36.79	▼20.27
Labour	Rosa Gomez	917		
Labour	John Small	841		
Green	Catherine Murphy	262	10.71	New
Registered electors		6,354		▼175
Turnout		2,513	39.55	▼2.91
Rejected ballots		18	0.72	▲0.36
Conservative gain from Labour				
Conservative gain from Labour				
Conservative gain from Labour				

=== North Defoe ===
North Defoe (2)
Party	Candidate	Votes	%	±%
Green	Yen Chong	661	50.08	▲31.83
Green	Paul Carswell	554		
Labour	James Carswell	455	35.49	▼32.34
Labour	John McCafferty^{†} (Note: McCafferty was a sitting councillor representing the Rectory ward)	406		
Conservative	Ann McGinley	125	10.14	▼3.78
Conservative	Michael Donoghue	121		
Socialist Alliance/ Communist Party	Anne Murphy	52	4.29	New
Registered electors		3,484		▼137
Turnout		1,281	36.77	▼5.04
Rejected ballots		11	0.86	▲0.46
Green gain from Labour				
Green gain from Labour				

=== Northfield ===
Northfield (3)
Party	Candidate	Votes	%	±%
Conservative	Medlin Lewis*	1,058	54.19	▲3.95
Conservative	Bernard Peretz^{†} (Note: Peretz was a sitting councillor representing the New River ward who was originally elected as a Labour councillor and who later defected to the Conservatives)	1,048		
Conservative	Christopher Sills*	1,044		
Labour	Victoria Murco	679	33.63	▼7.03
Labour	Michael Bartlet	647		
Labour	Sunday Owogumbu	629		
Green	Lucy Sommers	236	12.18	▲3.09
Registered electors		5,237		▼461
Turnout		1,938	37.01	▼6.44
Rejected ballots		13	0.67	▲0.51
Conservative hold				
Conservative hold				
Conservative hold				

=== Northwold ===
Northwold (3)
Party	Candidate	Votes	%	±%
Liberal Democrats	Ian Sharer* (Note: Share was initially elected as a member of the Labour Party but at sometime after the 1994 election he defected to the Liberal Democrats)	1,098	44.12	New
Liberal Democrats	Shahid Ahchala	1,073		
Liberal Democrats	Zev Lieberman	1,019		
Labour	Daphne McAllister	887	34.17	▼26.69
Labour	Joko Mafcoy	810		
Labour	Safeer Shaikh	774		
Green	Julie Hathaway	316	13.11	▼3.88
Conservative	Gordon Bell	227	8.60	▼13.54
Conservative	Grace Forsythe	211		
Conservative	Linda Hardy	184		
Registered electors		5,702		▼204
Turnout		2,438	42.76	▲7.00
Rejected ballots		22	0.90	▲0.28
Liberal Democrats gain from Labour				
Liberal Democrats gain from Labour				
Liberal Democrats gain from Labour				

=== Queensbridge ===
Queensbridge (3)
Party	Candidate	Votes	%	±%
Liberal Democrats	Mark Williams	983	47.83	▼11.01
Labour	Vernon Williams	959	45.54	▼8.21
Liberal Democrats	Hettie Peters* (Note: Peters was originally elected as a Labour councillor but later defected to the Liberal Democrats)	951		
Liberal Democrats	Anthony Terrill	881		
Labour	Nihal Fernando	870		
Labour	Emma Plouviez	851		
Conservative	Daphne Boyce	145	6.63	▼2.80
Conservative	Wendy Fuller	129		
Conservative	Maureen Mgaza	116		
Registered electors		5,507		▼1,222
Turnout		2,184	39.66	▼1.33
Rejected ballots		14	0.64	▲0.49
Liberal Democrats gain from Labour				
Labour hold				
Liberal Democrats gain from Labour				

=== Rectory ===
Rectory (3)
Party	Candidate	Votes	%	±%
Labour	Jessica Crowe	825	40.93	▼46.84
Labour	Irfan Malik	791		
Labour	Lazarus Oleforo^{†} (Note: Oleforo was a sitting councillor representing the Eastdown ward)	610		
Liberal Democrats	Mahmood Bham	499	25.16	New
Liberal Democrats	Jeshuran Lamb* (Note: Lamb was initially elected as a Labour councillor but at some time before this election they defected to the Liberal Democrats)	458		
Liberal Democrats	Steven Laing	411		
Green	Deborah Blackmore	309	17.05	New
Socialist Labour	Geoffrey Palmer	124	6.84	New
Conservative	Ahmed Mehter	123	5.66	▼6.57
Conservative	Ian Leask	97		
Conservative	Asif Patel	88		
Socialist Alliance/ Communist Party	Mark Fischer	79	4.36	New
Registered electors		5,217		▼793
Turnout		1,676	32.13	▼0.63
Rejected ballots		16	0.95	▼0.07
Labour hold				
Labour hold				
Labour hold				

=== South Defoe ===
South Defoe (2)
Party	Candidate	Votes	%	±%
Labour	Ian Peacock	471	45.23	▼23.05
Labour	Jules Pipe* (Note: Pipe was elected in a by-election triggered by the resignation of Cllr Anne Miller in 1996)	458		
Green	Mischa Borris	226	21.32	▲1.62
Green	Jon George	212		
Liberal Democrats	Philip Stark	156	13.78	New
Liberal Democrats	Keith Sexton	127		
Socialist Labour	Jennifer Burnett	98	9.54	New
Conservative	Paul Brenells	82	7.98	▼4.03
Independent	Michael Vidal	22	2.14	New
Registered electors		3,628		▼181
Turnout		1,115	30.73	▼3.06
Rejected ballots		21	1.88	▲1.41
Labour hold				
Labour hold				

=== Springfield ===
Springfield (3)
Party	Candidate	Votes	%	±%
Conservative	Heinz Lobenstein	1,406	61.90	▲8.47
Conservative	Isaac Leibowitz^{†} (Note: Leibowitz was a sitting councillor representing the Northwold ward who was originally elected as a Labour councillor but later defected to the Conservatives)	1,330		
Conservative	Eric Ollerenshaw*	1,323		
Labour	Linda Kelly	790	33.89	▼6.07
Labour	Dennis Sawyer	728		
Labour	Ian Thompson	704		
Communist	Monty Goldman	92	4.21	▼2.40
Registered electors		6,271		▼492
Turnout		2,357	37.59	▼5.72
Rejected ballots		25	1.06	▲0.68
Conservative hold				
Conservative hold				
Conservative hold				

=== Victoria ===
Victoria (3)
Party	Candidate	Votes	%	±%
Liberal Democrats	Howard Hyman*	1,046	48.43	▲0.08
Liberal Democrats	Patricia McGuiness	994		
Liberal Democrats	Lindsay Montgomery	980		
Labour	Jason Cox	965	43.44	▼1.19
Labour	Geoffrey Horn	897		
Labour	Faizullah Khan	847		
Conservative	Barbara Campbell	122	5.00	▼2.02
Conservative	Patricia Birgell	109		
Conservative	Doris Snelgrove	81		
BNP	Victor Dooley	65	3.13	New
Registered electors		6,366		▼640
Turnout		2,264	35.56	▼5.38
Rejected ballots		18	0.80	▲0.45
Liberal Democrats hold				
Liberal Democrats hold				
Liberal Democrats hold				

=== Wenlock ===
Wenlock (2)
Party	Candidate	Votes	%	±%
Liberal Democrats	Kevin Daws*	809	62.17	▼1.22
Liberal Democrats	Kay Stone	716		
Labour	Emma Burnell	373	27.92	▼0.57
Labour	Patricia Webster	312		
BNP	Kate McKay	89	7.26	New
Conservative	Caroline Fazzani	47	2.65	▼5.47
Conservative	Rita Than	18		
Registered electors		4,105		▼363
Turnout		1,341	32.67	▼7.03
Rejected ballots		10	0.75	▲0.58
Liberal Democrats hold				
Liberal Democrats hold				

=== Westdown ===
Westdown (2)
Party	Candidate	Votes	%	±%
Labour	Julie Grimble*	596	60.27	▼24.94
Labour	David Manion	493		
Liberal Democrats	Kevin Brock	162	16.38	New
Green	Nicholas Lee	151	16.71	New
Liberal Democrats	Jerry Parana-Hetty	134		
Conservative	Angela Kilmartin	62	6.64	▼8.15
Conservative	Peter Fazzani	58		
Registered electors		3,271		▼52
Turnout		929	28.40	▼5.91
Rejected ballots		11	1.18	▼0.22
Labour hold				
Labour hold				

=== Wick ===
Wick (3)
Party	Candidate	Votes	%	±%
Liberal Democrats	Neil Hughes	1,233	63.48	▲15.72
Liberal Democrats	Andrew Bridgwater	1,154		
Liberal Democrats	Adrian Gee-Turner	1,108		
Labour	Elizabeth Clowes	608	31.06	▼7.07
Labour	Allan Hilton	589		
Labour	William O'Connor^{†} (Note: O'Connor was a sitting councillor representing the Clissold ward)	513		
Conservative	Ann Brenells	117	5.47	▼2.67
Conservative	Yann Leclercq	100		
Conservative	Irene Wonderling	84		
Registered electors		6,063		▼940
Turnout		2,019	33.30	▼7.64
Rejected ballots		15	0.74	▲0.39
Liberal Democrats hold				
Liberal Democrats hold				
Liberal Democrats hold				
