= Luke Akehurst =

British politician (born 1972)

Luke Akehurst MP
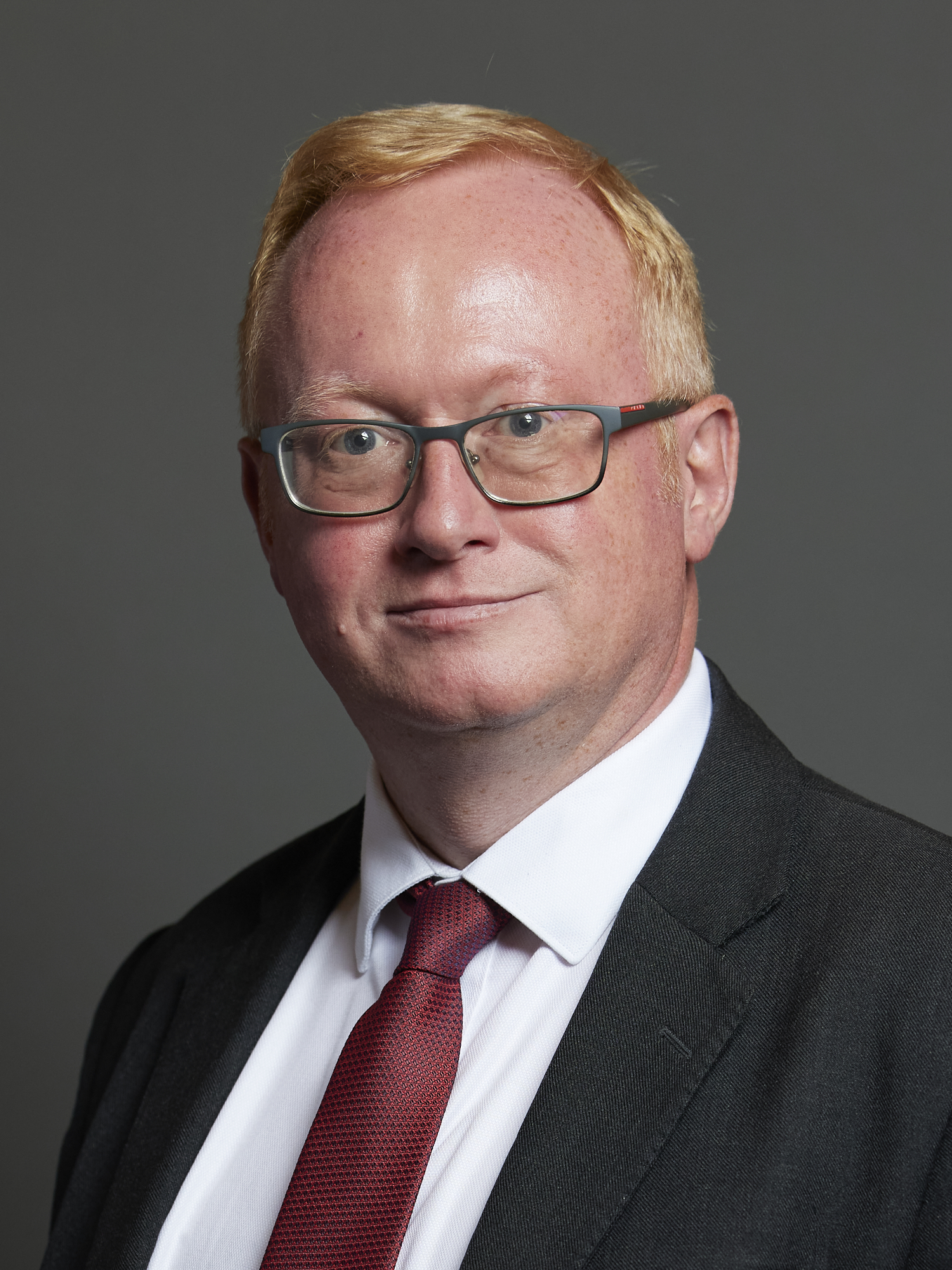
- Official portrait, 2024

Member of Parliament for North Durham
- Incumbent
- Assumed office 4 July 2024
- Preceded by: Kevan Jones
- Majority: 5,873 (14.1%)

Member of the National Executive Committee of the Labour Party
- Incumbent
- Assumed office November 2020
- In office 2010–2012

Member of Hackney London Borough Council for Chatham
- In office 2 May 2002 – 22 May 2014

Personal details
- Born: 2 March 1972 (age 54)
- Party: Labour
- Other political affiliations: Labour First
- Education: University of Bristol (BSc)
- Occupation: Director of We Believe in Israel

Luke Akehurst (born 2 March 1972) is a British Labour Party politician who has been the Member of Parliament (MP) for North Durham since 2024.

He is also a Labour Party official, and a former councillor. Since 2020, Akehurst has been a member of the National Executive Committee of the Labour Party (NEC), having previously been on the NEC from 2010 until 2012.

== Education and early career ==
Akehurst was privately educated at Kent College, Canterbury. He received a Bachelor of Science in politics from the University of Bristol in 1993.

Akehurst worked in the BBC Political Research Unit from 1996 to 2000, and at the communications firm Weber Shandwick from 2000 to 2011.

== Political career ==
=== Early activity (1993–2005) ===
Akehurst joined the Labour Party at 16 years old. He contested Cabot ward at the 1993 Avon County Council election, in which he came second to the Liberal Democrat candidate. He also unsuccessfully contested the 1995 Bristol City Council election in Stoke Bishop ward. Akehurst was National Secretary of Labour Students from 1995 to 1996.

Between 1996 and 1998, he was an officer for Anita Pollack, then a Member of the European Parliament, and a Labour organiser in Holborn and St Pancras. Akehurst was a political assistant to the Labour Group on Hackney London Borough Council from 1998 to 2000.

At the 2001 general election, Akehurst stood as the Labour candidate in Aldershot, coming third place behind incumbent Conservative MP Gerald Howarth and the Liberal Democrat Adrian Collett, in what has traditionally been a safe seat for the Conservatives.

In the 2002 Hackney borough council election, Akehurst was successfully elected to the council, representing Chatham ward. He was reelected to the council in 2006 and again in 2010, before standing down at the 2014 Hackney Council election.

At the 2005 general election, he stood for the Castle Point. In the run up to the election, Akehurst criticised an anti-immigration advert that sitting Conservative MP Bob Spink had published as "appalling comments that whip up racial tension" and "reminiscent of the worse utterances of Enoch Powell." Akehurst came second to Spink.

=== Activism and opposition to the left (2006–present) ===
In 2006, Akehurst became Secretary of Labour First, which represents moderates and "the old Labour Right". Under his leadership, the organisation has been committed to "Clause One socialism" of prioritising getting Labour candidates elected to parliament above policy, as well as advocating for a party "safe from the organised hard left".

In 2010, Akehurst was elected to the National Executive Committee (NEC) of the Labour Party. He was not re-elected in 2012.

During the 2015 Labour leadership election, Labour First urged Progress to join in supporting "ABC" (Anyone But Corbyn). Akehurst supported Yvette Cooper's campaign.

In 2016, Akehurst attempted to stand for a position on the NEC within the Constituency Labour Party (CLP) section, under the Corbyn-sceptic joint slate of candidates between Labour First and Progress, but the slate failed to achieve any candidates, all being beaten by the Momentum backed CLPD slate.

Akehurst spoke out against Jeremy Corbyn's leadership of the party numerous times. In a 2019 speech at a Jewish Labour Movement rally, Akehurst said he had nearly left the party over anti-Semitism, and hoped that Corbyn could be removed as leader. On social media, he described the United Nations as antisemitic and said that Jews were "politically black". He has been criticised for what The Guardian described as "his efforts to wrest control of Labour's national executive committee, conference agenda and constituency Labour parties from the Corbynite left". Akehurst has been referred to as subsequent Labour leader Keir Starmer's "leading cheerleader on the NEC" by Ronan Burtenshaw, editor of Tribune. Akehurst said of Starmer's attitude: "Voters like it when Labour leaders put the hard left back in their box".

In 2018, Akehurst attempted to stand for a position the NEC within the CLP section, again under the Labour First–Progress slate. Akehurst achieved 49 CLP nominations, but the slate failed to achieve any candidates, beaten by the pro-Corbyn joint Momentum–CLPD–CLGA slate.

Akehurst is described as a non-Jewish Zionist and since 2011 has been the director of the pro-Israel group We Believe in Israel. He has described Israel's actions in Gaza as proportionate. Momentum said Akehurst's views on Israel's actions were "a slap in the face to voters across the country already outraged by Labour's failings on Gaza".

In 2026, Akehurst opposed a petition for an inquiry into pro-Israel lobbying in UK politics, describing it as "deplorable". He said it "repeats an antisemitic trope about the world's only Jewish state somehow exerting undue influence over British politics". Scottish Greens MSP Maggie Chapman responded saying "There are already umpteen examples of pro-Israel groups and state actors lobbying in the UK. They wouldn’t be doing this if they didn’t want to win support for their agenda. Luke Akehurst knows this better than most as he used to run a pro-Israel lobbying group that provided spin and cover for the apartheid and war crimes of the Israeli government."

=== Return to National Executive Committee and election to the House of Commons (2020–present) ===
As secretary of Labour First, he was involved in 2020 talks with Progress, which established the pro-Starmer umbrella group Labour to Win.

In 2020, Akehurst was reelected in the first round to the Labour Party's NEC under the Labour to Win slate of nominees. He received more votes than any other candidate. In 2022, he was re-elected again and once more topped the polls.

In the 2021 Oxford City Council elections, Akehurst stood for office in the St. Mary's ward, and came in third place.

In May 2024, it was announced that Akehurst was to stand in the 2024 general election as the Labour Party candidate for North Durham. The nomination was criticised by left-wingers and pro-Palestine activists due to Akehurst's previous accusations against Palestinian civilians in the Israel-Hamas war of being paid crisis actors, and of the United Nations of being antisemitic. This led to a crowdfunding campaign opposing his nomination. Around the time of his nomination, Akehurst deleted hundreds of tweets including criticism of Jews, support for illegal settlements in the West Bank and Guantanamo Bay, and congratulating the Green Party. This led to accusations of inconsistent standards, as the NEC had removed Faiza Shaheen as a parliamentary candidate for liking social media posts by Green Party members.

In June 2024, Labour councillor and Momentum activist Martin Abrams, who is Jewish, submitted a complaint of antisemitism against Akehurst to the party. In a speech in 2020, Akehurst had said that Marxist Jews "have abandoned very much of their Jewish identity, they don't go to shul [synagogue] at all. You know, it's become a purely cultural thing around the occasional bowl of chicken soup or whatever." Abrams said "I believe Luke Akehurst's comments are deeply antisemitic by trying to define anti-Zionist Jews out of Judaism. The Good Jew, Bad Jew trope."

== Parliamentary career ==
Akehurst was elected as the Member of Parliament for North Durham in July 2024, holding the seat for Labour.

In November 2024, Akehurst voted in favour of the Terminally Ill Adults (End of Life) Bill, which proposes to legalise assisted suicide.

== Personal life ==
Akehurst is married to Oxford councillor Linda Smith. He has two children. In 2009 he developed POEMS syndrome, which left him hospitalised for five months and using a wheelchair for nine months afterwards. He now uses orthotics and a walking stick.

Parliament of the United Kingdom
| Preceded by Kevan Jones | Member of Parliament for North Durham; 2024–present | Incumbent |
