= Victoria (Hackney ward) =

Electoral ward in London local elections

- Electoral ward for the Hackney London Borough Council
- Victoria ward boundaries since 2014
- Borough: Hackney
- County: Greater London
- Population: 12,155 (2021)
- Electorate: 8,955 (2022)
- Major settlements: South Hackney
- Area: 0.7509 square kilometres (0.2899 sq mi)

Current electoral ward
- Created: 1965
- Number of members: 3
- Councillors: Rolf Dekker; Joanna Sumner; Daniel Rea
- ONS code: 00AMGT (2002–2014)
- GSS code: E05000248 (2002–2014); E05009386 (2014–present)

Victoria is an electoral ward in the London Borough of Hackney. The ward has existed since the creation of the borough on 1 April 1965 and was first used in the 1964 elections. It returns three councillors to Hackney London Borough Council.

== Hackney council elections since 2014 ==
There was a revision of ward boundaries in Hackney in 2014.

=== 2026 election ===
The election took place on 7 May 2026. In Victoria, the Green Party and the Hackney Independent Socialist Collective formed an electoral pact, with the latter fielding two candidates and the Greens fielding one. Councillor Clare Joseph, who had previously been elected as a Labour councillor for the ward, was deselected ahead of the 2026 election.

2026 Hackney London Borough Council election: Victoria (3)
Party	Candidate	Votes	%	±%
Green	Rolf Dekker	2,090	61.0	
Labour	Joanna Sumner	1,696	49.5	
Labour	Daniel Rea	1,493	43.6	
Labour	Andy Farrell	1,446	42.2	
Hackney Independent Socialist	Penny Wrout	1,010	29.5	
Hackney Independent Socialist	Claudia Turbet-Delof	997	29.1	
Liberal Democrats	Heather James	290	8.5	
Reform	Chloe Edwards	287	8.4	
Conservative	Alison Brownell	279	8.1	
Liberal Democrats	Frederick Gotts	253	7.4	
Conservative	Alexander Dawson	247	7.2	
Conservative	Almog Adir	186	5.4	
Turnout		11,650	42.3	
Green gain from Labour		Swing		
Labour hold		Swing		
Labour hold		Swing		

=== 2022 election ===
The election took place on 5 May 2022.

2022 Hackney London Borough Council election: Victoria (3)
Party	Candidate	Votes	%	±%
Labour	Clare Joseph	1,888	36.56	▼10.44
Labour	Claudia Turbet-Delof	1,539	29.80	▼17.20
Labour	Penny Wrout	1,459	28.25	▼14.25
Liberal Democrats	Helen Baxter	447	8.66	▼7.48
Green	Rolf Dekker	545	10.56	▼3.82
Green	Sandra McLeod	678	13.13	▼1.25
Green	Wendy Robinson	477	9.24	▼0.40
Conservative	Monika Hoppe-Krajewska	284	5.50	▼0.23
Conservative	Leijla Softic	236	4.57	▼1.16
TUSC	Jamie Barber	89	1.72	▼4.28
TUSC	Margaret Trotter	104	2.02	▼4.73
Turnout		5,165	33.02	▼0.54
Labour hold		Swing		
Labour hold		Swing		
Labour hold		Swing		

After voting against the party whip on a motion relating to a ceasefire of the Gaza war, the three Labour Party councillors were suspended and then resigned to form an independent group.

=== 2018 by-election ===
The by-election took place on 18 October 2018, following the resignation of Olumuyiwa Kuye.

2018 Victoria by-election
Party	Candidate	Votes	%	±%
Labour	Penny Wrout	1,311	57.4	▲20.8
Liberal Democrats	Pippa Morgan	436	19.1	▼27.6
Green	Wendy Robinson	296	12.9	▲3.7
Conservative	Christopher Sills (Note: Christopher Sills was a councillor for Leabridge from 1968 to 1971.)	148	6.5	▼8.5
Women's Equality	Harini Iyengar	84	3.7	
Turnout		2,284	25.0	▼9.6
Labour hold		Swing		

=== 2018 election ===
The election took place on 3 May 2018.

2018 Hackney London Borough Council election: Victoria (3)
Party	Candidate	Votes	%	±%
Labour	Catherine Hanson	2,271	56.81	▲1.57
Labour	Clare Joseph	1,880	47.00	▼7.28
Labour	Olumuyiwa Kuye	1,709	42.80	▼7.86
Liberal Democrats	Jeffry Gabbott-Rolph	270	6.75	▲2.40
Liberal Democrats	Heather James	299	7.48	▲2.58
Conservative	Salma Lunat	229	5.73	▼1.57
Conservative	John Moir	212	5.30	▼1.80
Conservative	Susan Moir	210	5.25	▲1.27
Green	Sandra McLeod	575	14.38	▼2.48
Green	Liam Palmer	302	7.56	▼7.88
Green	Wendy Robinson	385	9.64	▼5.44
Liberal Democrats	David Sommer	160	4.00	▲1.00
Turnout		4,000	34.6	▼0.54
Labour hold		Swing		
Labour hold		Swing		
Labour hold		Swing		

=== 2014 election ===
The election took place on 22 May 2014.

2014 Hackney London Borough Council election: Victoria (3)
Party	Candidate	Votes	%	±%
Labour	Will Brett	2,096	55.24	
Labour	Katie Hanson	2,059	54.28	
Labour	Geoff Taylor	1,921	50.66	
Green	Helen Fiona Roberts	640	16.86	
Green	Zoe Hall	586	15.44	
Green	Wendy Louise Robinson	572	15.08	
Conservative	Winifred Saunders	278	7.33	
Conservative	Shahi Dewan	269	7.10	
UKIP	Sheila Priest	256	6.75	
Liberal Democrats	Heather Lynn James	186	4.90	
Liberal Democrats	Ian Francis Gaskin	165	4.35	
Conservative	Rumi Begum	151	3.98	
Liberal Democrats	Theodore Jacobson	114	3.00	
Turnout		3,797	37.98	
Labour win (new boundaries)				
Labour win (new boundaries)				
Labour win (new boundaries)				

== 2002–2014 Hackney council elections ==
Victoria ward boundaries from 2002 to 2014

There was a revision of ward boundaries in Hackney in 2002.

=== 2010 election ===
The election on 6 May 2010 took place on the same day as the United Kingdom general election.

2010 Hackney London Borough Council election:Victoria (3)
Party	Candidate	Votes	%	±%
Labour	Catherine Hanson	2,873	53.57	▲6.67
Labour	Daniel Kemp	2,641	49.26	▲8.36
Labour	Geoff Taylor	2,305	43.00	▲7.81
Green	Kate Ellen Charteris	707	13.18	▼7.92
Conservative	Graeme Ernest Barclay Archer	710	13.24	▼0.56
Conservative	Tony Burkson	683	12.74	
Green	Paul Homer	533	9.94	
Green	Morgan Hope Phillips	453	8.45	
Liberal Democrats	Heather James	1,288	24.02	▲5.72
Liberal Democrats	Joe Jordan	994	18.54	
Liberal Democrats	Geraint Rees	729	13.60	
Conservative	Winifred Saunders	500	9.32	
Majority		232		
Majority		336		
Majority		630		
Turnout		5,362	57.00	▲23.00
Labour hold		Swing		
Labour hold		Swing		
Labour hold		Swing		

=== 2006 election ===
The election took place on 4 May 2006.

2006 Hackney London Borough Council election: Victoria (3)
Party	Candidate	Votes	%	±%
Labour	Catherine Hanson	1,425	46.9	▼2.7
Labour	Daniel Kemp	1,396		
Labour	Geoffrey Taylor	1,290		
Green	Tumble Bone	641	21.1	▲6.1
Liberal Democrats	Susan Horowitz	555	18.3	▼1.2
Liberal Democrats	Stephen Jackson	475		
Conservative	Graeme Archer	419	13.8	▼0.8
Liberal Democrats	Stuart Round	415		
Conservative	Keith Pannell	376		
Conservative	Steven Farquhar	311		
Turnout		8,089	34.0	▼0.2
Labour hold		Swing		
Labour hold		Swing		
Labour hold		Swing		

=== 2002 election ===
The election took place on 2 May 2002.

2002 Hackney London Borough Council election: Victoria (3)
Party	Candidate	Votes	%	±%
Labour	Daniel Kemp	1,354	49.6	▲2.0
Labour	Muriel Purkiss	1,305		
Labour	Geoffrey Taylor	1,236		
Liberal Democrats	Witman Laryea	533	19.5	▼28.1
Liberal Democrats	Howard Hyman	522		
Liberal Democrats	Mahmood Bham	434		
Green	Emma Sheppard	409	15.0	▲12.0
Conservative	Harold Symons	298	10.9	▲5.3
Conservative	Frances Brotzel	242		
Conservative	Naphtali Tiefenbrun	201		
CPA	William Thompson	135	4.9	
Turnout		3,797	31.4	▼4.1
Labour win (new boundaries)				
Labour win (new boundaries)				
Labour win (new boundaries)				

== 1978–2002 Hackney council elections ==
There was a revision of ward boundaries in Hackney in 1978. There was a significant change to the ward boundaries in 1994 when Victoria Park was brought fully into Tower Hamlets, however as this area was unpopulated it made no change to the electorate.

=== 1998 election ===
The election took place on 7 May 1998.

1998 Hackney London Borough Council election: Victoria (3)
Party	Candidate	Votes	%	±%
Liberal Democrats	Howard Hyman	1,046	47.6	▼0.7
Liberal Democrats	Patricia McGuiness (Ms.)	994		
Liberal Democrats	Lindsay Montgomery	980		
Labour	Jason Cox	965	43.9	▼0.1
Labour	Geoffrey Horn	897		
Labour	Faizullah Khan	847		
Conservative	Barbara Campbell (Ms.)	122	5.6	▼2.1
Conservative	Patricia Bignell (Ms.)	109		
Conservative	Doris E. Snelgrove (Ms.)	81		
BNP	Victor J. Dooley	65	3.0	
Turnout		6,366	35.5	▼5.4
Liberal Democrats hold		Swing		
Liberal Democrats hold		Swing		
Liberal Democrats hold		Swing		

=== 1994 election ===
The election took place on 5 May 1994.

1994 Hackney London Borough Council election: Victoria (3)
Party	Candidate	Votes	%	±%
Liberal Democrats	Catherine P. Courtney	1,332	48.3	▲4.3
Liberal Democrats	Howard Hyman	1,300		
Liberal Democrats	Celya A. Maxted	1,233		
Labour	Mavis McCullum	1,214	44.0	▼3.6
Labour	Lewis Goldberg	1,213		
Labour	Abdul G. Mulla	1,140		
Conservative	Gavin G. Gardiner	213	7.7	▼7.7
Conservative	Marion R.A. Desmond	196		
Conservative	Nick C.C. Tang	153		
Turnout		7,003	40.9	▼7.2
Liberal Democrats gain from Labour		Swing		
Liberal Democrats hold		Swing		
Liberal Democrats gain from Labour		Swing		

=== 1991 by-election ===
The by-election took place on 14 March 1991, following the disqualification of Ali Uddin.

1991 Victoria by-election
Party	Candidate	Votes	%	±%
Liberal Democrats	Howard Hyman	784	31.9	
Labour	Isaac Leibowitz	721	29.3	
Conservative	Christopher Sills	682	27.7	
Green	Leonard Lucas	271	11.0	
Turnout			31.8	
Liberal Democrats gain from Labour		Swing		

=== 1990 election ===
The election took place on 3 May 1990.

1990 Hackney London Borough Council election: Victoria (3)
Party	Candidate	Votes	%	±%
Labour	David A. Bell	1,306	41.8	▲19.1
Labour	Lewis Goldberg	1,188		
Labour	Ali M.B. Uddin	997		
Liberal Democrats	Elizabeth K. Balfour	708	22.7	▲22.7
Liberal Democrats	Sarah G. Turner	569		
Liberal Democrats	Mark N. Smulian	539		
Green	Leonard Lucas	525	16.8	▲16.8
Conservative	Derek Mahoney	482	15.4	▼7.9
Conservative	Cheuk C. Tang	414		
Conservative	Michael Trend	409		
Communist	Patricia F. Turnbull	101	3.2	▲3.2
Turnout		8,003	33.7	▼2.5
Labour hold		Swing		
Labour hold		Swing		
Labour hold		Swing		

=== 1986 election ===
The election took place on 8 May 1986.

1986 Hackney London Borough Council election: Victoria (3)
Party	Candidate	Votes	%	±%
Labour	Edith Edwards	1,180	33.9	▼13.6
Labour	Medlin Lewis	1,147		
Labour	Adrienne Morgan	1,106		
SDP	Louise J. Baird	888	25.5	▼1.3
SDP	Robert H. Ansell	862		
Alliance	Luke J. Maughan-Pawsey	818	23.5	▲23.5
Conservative	Valerie A. Brown	591	17.0	▼6.6
Conservative	Leigh M. Kershaw	566		
Conservative	James A. Baker	547		
Turnout		7,726	36.2	▼1.7
Labour hold		Swing		
Labour hold		Swing		
Labour hold		Swing		

=== 1982 election ===
The election took place on 6 May 1982.

1982 Hackney London Borough Council election: Victoria (3)
Party	Candidate	Votes	%	±%
Labour	J. Andrews (Ms.)	1,195	47.5	▼11.2
Labour	C. Cable	1,129		
Labour	S. Shaikh	1,042		
SDP	R. Moore	674	26.8	▲15.6
SDP	L. Baird (Ms.)	664		
SDP	R. Saoul	598		
Conservative	M. Brown	595	23.6	▼−2.3
Conservative	H. Symons	520		
Conservative	J. Warner (Ms.)	505		
Workers Revolutionary	P. Curtis	52	2.1	▲2.1
Turnout		7,755	33.3	▼4.6
Labour hold		Swing		
Labour hold		Swing		
Labour hold		Swing		

=== 1978 election ===
The election took place on 4 May 1978.

1978 Hackney London Borough Council election: Victoria (3)
Party	Candidate	Votes	%	±%
Labour	Michael J. Andrews	1,773	58.7	▲8.7
Labour	Joannie A. Andrews	1,693		
Labour	Fitzherbert Harewood	1,642		
Conservative	David Mumford	704	23.3	▲9.3
Conservative	Iris Wicks	686		
Conservative	Harold Symons	684		
National Front	Peter Harwood	338	11.2	▲11.2
National Front	William G. Sullivan	258		
National Front	Florence Ody	244		
Liberal	Joan M.W. Bailey	203	6.7	▲6.7
Liberal	Lionel Okun	129		
Liberal	Irving Savitt	113		
Turnout		8,317	37.9	▲10.7
Labour win (new boundaries)				
Labour win (new boundaries)				
Labour win (new boundaries)				

== 1964–1978 Hackney council elections ==
External image
- Victoria ward boundaries from 1965 to 1978

=== 1974 election ===
The election took place on 2 May 1974.

1974 Hackney London Borough Council election: Victoria (3)
Party	Candidate	Votes	%	±%
Labour	S. E. Kelly	1,734	76.0	▼6.1
Labour	F. H. Harewood	1,712	75.1	
Labour	Joannie A. Andrews	1,684	73.6	
Liberal	R. A. King	311	13.6	▲13.6
Liberal	J. J. E. Ludwig	295	12.9	
Liberal	W. G. Wintle	278	12.1	
Conservative	W. G. Julian	238	10.4	▼3.6
Conservative	W. H. Stracey	197	8.3	
Conservative	I. R. Wicks	185	7.8	
Turnout		2,281	27.2	▼6.8
Labour hold		Swing		
Labour hold		Swing		
Labour hold		Swing		

=== 1973 by-election ===
The by-election took place on 14 June 1973.

1973 Victoria by-election
Party	Candidate	Votes	%	±%
Labour	Joannie Andrews	1,065		
Conservative	J. Lessner	125		
Majority		940		
Turnout		8,803	13.6	
Labour hold		Swing		

=== 1971 election ===
The election took place on 13 May 1971.

1971 Hackney London Borough Council election: Victoria (3)
Party	Candidate	Votes	%	±%
Labour	S. Kelly	2,413	82.1	▲32.5
Labour	J. Evans	2,397	81.4	
Labour	J. Dunning	2,314	78.8	
Conservative	N. Loweth	412	14.0	▼3.3
Conservative	T. Phillips	397	13.5	
Conservative	W. White	384	13.1	
Communist	M. Kolander	115	3.9	▼2.6
Turnout		2,938	34.0	▲19.4
Labour hold		Swing		
Labour hold		Swing		
Labour hold		Swing		

=== 1968 election ===
The election took place on 9 May 1968.

1968 Hackney London Borough Council election Victoria (3)
Party	Candidate	Votes	%	±%
Labour	D. Ward	747	49.6	▼18.5
Labour	S. Kelly	738		
Labour	S. Warne	728		
Conservative	F. Perry	647	43.0	▲28.3
Conservative	A. Seaman	623		
Conservative	R. Seaman (Ms.)	603		
Communist	M. Kolander	111	7.4	▲0.9
Turnout		1,494	6.6	▼46.9
Labour hold		Swing		
Labour hold		Swing		
Labour hold		Swing		

=== 1964 election ===
The election took place on 7 May 1964.

1964 Hackney London Borough Council election: Victoria (3)
Party	Candidate	Votes	%	±%
Labour	F. Shipp	873	68.1	
Labour	D. Ward	859		
Labour	A. Pedrick	847		
Conservative	A. Seaman	188	14.7	
Conservative	W. Fairman	168		
Conservative	S. Branchflower	158		
Liberal	M. Fisher	137	10.7	
Liberal	T. Gates	132		
Liberal	G. McConnell	120		
Communist	M. Kolander	83	6.5	
Turnout		1,280	53.5	
Labour win (new seat)				
Labour win (new seat)				
Labour win (new seat)				
