= Lea Bridge (Hackney ward) =

Electoral ward in London, England

- Electoral ward for the Hackney London Borough Council
- Lea Bridge (Hackney) ward boundaries since 2014
- Borough: Hackney
- County: Greater London
- Population: 14,125 (2021)
- Electorate: 10,158 (2022)
- Area: 1.046 square kilometres (0.404 sq mi)

Current electoral ward
- Created: 2014
- Number of members: 3
- Councillors: Margaret Gordon; Ian Rathbone; Deniz Oguzkanli
- Created from: Chatham, Leabridge
- GSS code: E05009380

Lea Bridge is an electoral ward in the London Borough of Hackney. The ward was first used in the 2014 elections. It returns three councillors to Hackney London Borough Council.

== List of councillors ==
Term	Councillor	Party
2014–present	Margaret Gordon	Labour
2014–present	Ian Rathbone	Labour
2014–present	Deniz Oguzkanli	Labour

== Hackney council elections ==
=== 2022 election ===
The election took place on 5 May 2022.

2022 Hackney London Borough Council election: Lea Bridge
Party	Candidate	Votes	%	±%
Labour	Margaret Gordon	2,080	70.3	
Labour	Ian Rathbone	1,802	60.9	
Labour	Deniz Oguzkanli	1,732	58.6	
Green	Ruth Jenkins	881	29.8	
Green	Douglas Earl	716	24.2	
Green	Sally Zlotowitz	692	23.4	
Liberal Democrats	Juliette Bigley	322	10.9	
Conservative	Yaakov Lauer	224	7.6	
Conservative	Marzena Sterner	218	7.4	
Conservative	Yeshoah Leibowitz	204	6.9	
Turnout			31.6	
Labour hold		Swing		
Labour hold		Swing		
Labour hold		Swing		

=== 2018 election ===
The election took place on 3 May 2018.

2018 Hackney London Borough Council election: Lea Bridge
Party	Candidate	Votes	%	±%
Labour	Margaret Gordon	2,596	70.3	
Labour	Ian Rathbone	2,144	58.1	
Labour	Deniz Oguzkanli	2,096	56.8	
Green	Ruth Jenkins	737	20.0	
Green	Heather Hampson	700	19.0	
Green	Douglas Earl	574	15.6	
Conservative	Imtiyaz Lunat	321	8.7	
Liberal Democrats	Benjamin Mathis	253	6.9	
Conservative	Linda Kelly	248	6.7	
Conservative	Rumi Begum	242	6.6	
Liberal Democrats	Joseph Willits	220	6.0	
Majority				
Turnout			36.1	
Labour hold		Swing		
Labour hold		Swing		
Labour hold		Swing		

=== 2014 election ===
The election took place on 22 May 2014.

2014 Hackney London Borough Council election: Lea Bridge
Party	Candidate	Votes	%	±%
Majority				
Turnout				
	Labour win (new seat)			
	Labour win (new seat)			
	Labour win (new seat)			
