= 2014 Hackney London Borough Council election =

2014 local election in England

Map of the results of the 2014 Hackney council election. Conservatives in blue, Labour in red and Liberal Democrats in yellow.

Elections to Hackney London Borough Council took place on 22 May 2014, the same day as the 2014 United Kingdom local elections.

== Results ==
Hackney local election result 2014
| Party | Seats | Gains | Losses | Net gain/loss | Seats % | Votes % | Votes | +/− |
|---|---|---|---|---|---|---|---|---|
| Labour | 50 | | | ±0 | 87.7 | 58.1 | 102,709 | |
| Green | 0 | | | ±0 | 0.0 | 20.5 | 36,250 | |
| Conservative | 4 | | | ±0 | 7.0 | 12.0 | 21,296 | |
| Liberal Democrats | 3 | | | ±0 | 5.3 | 8.2 | 14,505 | |
| TUSC | 0 | | | ±0 | 0.0 | 0.8 | 1,386 | |
| UKIP | 0 | | | ±0 | 0.0 | 0.2 | 346 | |
| Independent | 0 | | | ±0 | 0.0 | 0.2 | 328 | |

== Alteration of electoral wards of London Borough of Hackney ==
The Hackney (Electoral Changes) Order 2013 reduces the size of the council and creates new electoral wards.

The Local Government Boundary Commission for England began the process of changing the size of Hackney in 2012. The new warding arrangement for the elections in 2014 are as follows.

Warding arrangement of Hackney, 2014
| Ward | Number of councillors to be elected |
|---|---|
| Brownswood | 2 |
| Cazenove | 3 |
| Clissold | 3 |
| Dalston | 2 |
| De Beauvoir | 2 |
| Hackney Central | 3 |
| Hackney Downs | 3 |
| Hackney Wick | 3 |
| Haggerston | 3 |
| Homerton | 3 |
| Hoxton East and Shoreditch | 3 |
| Hoxton West | 3 |
| King's Park | 3 |
| Lea Bridge | 3 |
| London Fields | 3 |
| Shacklewell | 2 |
| Springfield | 3 |
| Stamford Hill West | 2 |
| Stoke Newington | 3 |
| Victoria | 3 |
| Woodberry Down | 2 |

== Election for Mayor ==
Hackney Mayoral election, 2014
| Party | Candidate | 1st round | | 2nd round | | | 1st round votesTransfer votes, 2nd round |
| Party | Candidate | Total | Of round | Transfers | Total | Of round | 1st round votesTransfer votes, 2nd round |
|---|---|---|---|---|---|---|---|
| Labour | Jules Pipe | 40,858 | 60.38% | | | | |
| Green | Mischa Borris | 11,489 | 17.51% | | | | |
| Conservative | Linda Kelly | 7,853 | 11.61% | | | | |
| Liberal Democrats | Simon De Deney | 3,840 | 5.68% | | | | |
| Putting Hackney First | Mustafa Korel | 3,265 | 4.83% | | | | |
| Turnout | | 69,146 | 39.61 | | | | |

Under the Supplementary Vote system, if no candidate receives 50% of 1st choice votes, 2nd choice votes are added to the result for the top two 1st choice candidates. If a ballot gives a first and second preference to the top two candidates in either order, then their second preference is not counted, so that a second preference cannot count against a first.

== Ward results ==
=== Brownswood ===
Hackney Council election, 2014: Brownswood
| Party | Candidate | Votes | % | ±% |
|---|---|---|---|---|
| Labour | Clare Potter | 1,335 | 53.4 | |
| Labour | Brian Bell | 1,287 | 51.5 | |
| Green | Sam Butler | 562 | 22.5 | |
| Green | Peter Lang | 484 | 19.4 | |
| Conservative | Bella Aussenberg | 229 | 9.2 | |
| Conservative | Andrew White | 226 | 9.0 | |
| Liberal Democrats | Dominic Leigh | 195 | 7.8 | |
| Liberal Democrats | Bella Sharer | 171 | 6.8 | |
| TUSC | Thomas Rubens | 104 | 4.2 | |
| Majority | | 725 | | |
| Turnout | | 2,501 | 40.4 | |
| Labour hold | | Swing | | |
| Labour hold | | Swing | | |

=== Cazenove ===
Hackney Council elections, 2014: Cazenove
| Party | Candidate | Votes | % | ±% |
|---|---|---|---|---|
| Liberal Democrats | Abraham Jacobson | 1,731 | 38.9 | |
| Liberal Democrats | Dawood Akhoon | 1,715 | 38.6 | |
| Liberal Democrats | Ian Sharer | 1,709 | 38.4 | |
| Labour | Kofo Adeolu-David | 1,688 | 38.0 | |
| Labour | Gilbert Smyth | 1,602 | 36.0 | |
| Labour | Matthew Burn | 1,593 | 35.8 | |
| Green | Mischa Borris | 744 | 16.7 | |
| Green | Jenny Lopez | 580 | 13.0 | |
| Green | Teresa Webb | 538 | 12.1 | |
| Conservative | Marzena Kwasnik | 209 | 4.7 | |
| Conservative | Pamela Sills | 189 | 4.3 | |
| Conservative | Erika Halasz | 150 | 3.4 | |
| Majority | | 21 | | |
| Turnout | | 4,447 | 49.3 | |
| Liberal Democrats hold | | Swing | | |
| Liberal Democrats hold | | Swing | | |
| Liberal Democrats hold | | Swing | | |

=== Clissold ===
Hackney Council elections, 2014: Clissold
| Party | Candidate | Votes | % | ±% |
|---|---|---|---|---|
| Labour | Sophie Cameron | 2,519 | 59.8 | |
| Labour | Ned Hercock | 2,103 | 50.0 | |
| Labour | Sade Etti | 2,010 | 47.8 | |
| Green | Charlotte George | 1,287 | 30.6 | |
| Green | Griffin Carpenter | 1,125 | 26.7 | |
| Green | Kirsty Styles | 1,040 | 24.7 | |
| Liberal Democrats | Sylvia Anderson | 410 | 9.7 | |
| Liberal Democrats | Simon de Deney | 345 | 8.2 | |
| Conservative | Alison Cook | 305 | 7.2 | |
| Conservative | Glenda Aussenberg | 263 | 6.2 | |
| Liberal Democrats | Tony Harms | 207 | 4.9 | |
| Conservative | Ita Steinberger | 207 | 4.9 | |
| Majority | | 723 | | |
| Turnout | | 4,209 | 45.1 | |
| Labour hold | | Swing | | |
| Labour hold | | Swing | | |
| Labour hold | | Swing | | |

=== Dalston ===
Hackney Council election, 2014: Dalston
| Party | Candidate | Votes | % | ±% |
|---|---|---|---|---|
| Labour | Soraya Adejare | 1,173 | 52.6 | |
| Labour | Peter Snell | 1,067 | 47.8 | |
| Green | Dominic Cort | 664 | 29.8 | |
| Green | Daniel Key | 489 | 21.9 | |
| Liberal Democrats | James Driver | 170 | 7.6 | |
| Liberal Democrats | Pauline Pearce | 146 | 6.5 | |
| Conservative | Rochelle Aussenberg | 139 | 6.2 | |
| Conservative | Andrzej Krajewski | 101 | 4.5 | |
| UKIP | Luke Basevi | 90 | 4.0 | |
| Majority | | 403 | | |
| Turnout | | 2,231 | 35.5 | |
| Labour hold | | Swing | | |
| Labour hold | | Swing | | |

=== De Beauvoir ===
Hackney Council election, 2014: De Beauvoir
| Party | Candidate | Votes | % | ±% |
|---|---|---|---|---|
| Labour | Laura Bunt | 1,336 | 52.2 | |
| Labour | James Peters | 1,245 | 48.7 | |
| Green | Catherine Ryan | 476 | 18.6 | |
| Conservative | Cameron Brown | 433 | 16.9 | |
| Green | Nicholas Lee | 418 | 16.3 | |
| Conservative | Weronika Zolnierzak | 342 | 13.4 | |
| Liberal Democrats | Rebecca Freeman | 189 | 7.4 | |
| Liberal Democrats | Cynthia Dimineux | 150 | 5.9 | |
| TUSC | Chris Newby | 58 | 2.3 | |
| Majority | | 769 | | |
| Turnout | | 2,558 | 38.6 | |
| Labour hold | | Swing | | |
| Labour hold | | Swing | | |

=== Hackney Central ===
Hackney Council elections, 2014: Hackney Central
| Party | Candidate | Votes | % | ±% |
|---|---|---|---|---|
| Labour | Sophie Linden | 2,094 | 61.7 | |
| Labour | Ben Hayhurst | 2,082 | 61.3 | |
| Labour | Vincent Stops | 1,916 | 56.4 | |
| Green | Christopher Venables | 751 | 22.1 | |
| Green | George Graham | 738 | 21.7 | |
| Green | Alec Rossiter | 717 | 21.1 | |
| Liberal Democrats | Reuben Thompson-Wood | 240 | 7.1 | |
| Liberal Democrats | James Lyons | 202 | 6.0 | |
| Conservative | Heather Whitelaw | 190 | 5.6 | |
| Conservative | Fadile Unek | 184 | 5.4 | |
| Conservative | Elzbieta Wancowicz | 167 | 4.9 | |
| Majority | | 1,165 | | |
| Turnout | | 3,394 | 37.9 | |
| Labour hold | | Swing | | |
| Labour hold | | Swing | | |
| Labour hold | | Swing | | |

=== Hackney Downs ===
Hackney Council elections, 2014: Hackney Downs
| Party | Candidate | Votes | % | ±% |
|---|---|---|---|---|
| Labour | Michael Desmond | 2,115 | 57.3 | |
| Labour | Anna-Joy Rickard | 2,100 | 56.9 | |
| Labour | Rick Muir | 2,020 | 54.7 | |
| Green | Alexander Brown | 843 | 22.8 | |
| Green | Stuart Coggins | 834 | 22.6 | |
| Green | Andrew Guise | 719 | 19.5 | |
| Liberal Democrats | Teena Lashmore | 342 | 9.3 | |
| Liberal Democrats | Mohammed Sadiq | 293 | 7.9 | |
| Liberal Democrats | Garry Malcolm | 249 | 6.7 | |
| Conservative | Amy Gray | 214 | 5.8 | |
| Conservative | Duncan Gray | 214 | 5.8 | |
| Conservative | Izabel Leosz | 149 | 4.0 | |
| Majority | | | | |
| Turnout | | 3,691 | 39.8 | |
| Labour hold | | Swing | | |
| Labour hold | | Swing | | |
| Labour hold | | Swing | | |

=== Hackney Wick ===
Hackney Council elections, 2014: Hackney Wick
| Party | Candidate | Votes | % | ±% |
|---|---|---|---|---|
| Labour | Chris Kennedy | 1,830 | 62.8 | |
| Labour | Jess Webb | 1,810 | 62.2 | |
| Labour | Nick Sharman | 1,700 | 58.4 | |
| Green | Nicholas Hughes | 634 | 21.8 | |
| Green | Laura Salisbury | 524 | 18.0 | |
| Green | Caroline Salem | 446 | 15.3 | |
| Liberal Democrats | Ahmed Idris | 236 | 8.1 | |
| Conservative | James Kane | 209 | 7.2 | |
| Conservative | Jack Colson | 203 | 7.0 | |
| Conservative | Stanley Lewry | 194 | 6.7 | |
| Liberal Democrats | Ben Mathis | 165 | 5.7 | |
| Liberal Democrats | Maria Ibars | 124 | 4.3 | |
| TUSC | Margaret Trotter | 121 | 4.2 | |
| Majority | | | | |
| Turnout | | 2,912 | 32.6 | |
| Labour hold | | Swing | | |
| Labour hold | | Swing | | |
| Labour hold | | Swing | | |

=== Haggerston ===
Hackney Council elections, 2014: Haggerston
| Party | Candidate | Votes | % | ±% |
|---|---|---|---|---|
| Labour | Barry Buitekant | 1,832 | 56.8 | |
| Labour | Jonathan McShane | 1,816 | 56.3 | |
| Labour | Ann Munn | 1,809 | 56.0 | |
| Green | Heather Finlay | 602 | 18.6 | |
| Green | Andrew Fernandez | 566 | 17.5 | |
| Green | Gideon Corby | 557 | 17.3 | |
| Conservative | Doreen Bullock | 362 | 11.2 | |
| Conservative | Clarence King | 254 | 7.9 | |
| Conservative | Timothy Wright | 244 | 7.6 | |
| TUSC | Oktay Cinpolat | 243 | 7.5 | |
| Liberal Democrats | Joe Jordan | 181 | 5.6 | |
| Liberal Democrats | Geoffrey Payne | 131 | 4.1 | |
| Liberal Democrats | Meyer Rapaport | 94 | 2.9 | |
| Majority | | 1,207 | | |
| Turnout | | 3,228 | 34.9 | |
| Labour hold | | Swing | | |
| Labour hold | | Swing | | |
| Labour hold | | Swing | | |

=== Homerton ===
Hackney Council elections, 2014: Homerton
| Party | Candidate | Votes | % | ±% |
|---|---|---|---|---|
| Labour | Robert Chapman | 2,120 | 65.8 | |
| Labour | Guy Nicholson | 2,029 | 63.0 | |
| Labour | Sally Mulready | 1,993 | 61.9 | |
| Green | Kevin Clark | 548 | 17.0 | |
| Green | John Devaney | 527 | 16.4 | |
| Green | Virginia Calvo | 507 | 15.7 | |
| Conservative | Stephen Selby | 231 | 7.2 | |
| Liberal Democrats | Melissa Harflett | 216 | 6.7 | |
| Conservative | Oluwagbemiro Igunnubole | 201 | 6.2 | |
| Independent | Shuruj Miah | 194 | 6.0 | |
| Conservative | Alina Nowobilski | 187 | 5.8 | |
| Liberal Democrats | Charlie Harris | 183 | 5.7 | |
| Liberal Democrats | Susan Horowitz | 126 | 3.9 | |
| Majority | | 1,445 | | |
| Turnout | | 3,222 | 37.5 | |
| Labour hold | | Swing | | |
| Labour hold | | Swing | | |
| Labour hold | | Swing | | |

=== Hoxton East & Shoreditch ===
Hackney Council elections, 2014: Hoxton East & Shoreditch
| Party | Candidate | Votes | % | ±% |
|---|---|---|---|---|
| Labour | Kam Adams | 1,588 | 59.9 | |
| Labour | Feryal Demirci | 1,421 | 53.6 | |
| Labour | Tom Ebbutt | 1,385 | 52.2 | |
| Green | Thomas Bailey | 444 | 16.7 | |
| Green | Rachel Chance | 392 | 14.8 | |
| Green | Jonathan Cowdrill | 358 | 13.5 | |
| Conservative | Christopher Sills | 356 | 13.4 | |
| Conservative | Thomas Spiller | 355 | 13.4 | |
| Conservative | Jack Tinley | 323 | 12.2 | |
| Liberal Democrats | John Clinch | 185 | 7.0 | |
| Liberal Democrats | Peter Friend | 185 | 7.0 | |
| Liberal Democrats | Kat Bavage | 172 | 6.5 | |
| TUSC | Judith Beishon | 126 | 4.8 | |
| TUSC | Paul Mattsson | 77 | 2.9 | |
| Majority | | 941 | | |
| Turnout | | 2,651 | 31.1 | |
| Labour hold | | Swing | | |
| Labour hold | | Swing | | |
| Labour hold | | Swing | | |

=== Hoxton West ===
Hackney Council elections, 2014: Hoxton West
| Party | Candidate | Votes | % | ±% |
|---|---|---|---|---|
| Labour | Philip Glanville | 1,693 | 56.8 | |
| Labour | Clay McKenzie | 1,687 | 56.6 | |
| Labour | Carole Williams | 1,634 | 54.8 | |
| Green | Kate Barnett | 602 | 20.2 | |
| Green | Matthew Butcher | 487 | 16.3 | |
| Green | Jeannine Moros-Noujaim | 448 | 15.0 | |
| Conservative | Reinier Bosman | 362 | 12.1 | |
| Conservative | John Howard | 339 | 11.4 | |
| Conservative | Sean Sullivan | 326 | 10.9 | |
| Liberal Democrats | Joseph Horowitz | 190 | 6.4 | |
| Liberal Democrats | Ben See | 182 | 6.1 | |
| Liberal Democrats | Antonio Silva | 161 | 5.4 | |
| TUSC | Jon Hughes | 136 | 4.6 | |
| Majority | | 1,032 | | |
| Turnout | | 2,981 | 33.6 | |
| Labour hold | | Swing | | |
| Labour hold | | Swing | | |
| Labour hold | | Swing | | |

=== King's Park ===
Hackney Council elections, 2014: King's Park
| Party | Candidate | Votes | % | ±% |
|---|---|---|---|---|
| Labour | Sharon Patrick | 2,290 | 66.2 | |
| Labour | Tom Rahilly | 2,068 | 59.8 | |
| Labour | Rebecca Rennison | 2,013 | 58.2 | |
| Green | Ruth Grove-White | 701 | 20.3 | |
| Green | Peter Jones | 684 | 19.8 | |
| Green | Christopher Heaton | 604 | 17.5 | |
| Conservative | James MacDaid | 226 | 6.5 | |
| Conservative | Andrew Turgut | 203 | 5.9 | |
| Conservative | Sheena Sheikh | 202 | 5.8 | |
| Liberal Democrats | Jeff Pemberton | 182 | 5.3 | |
| Independent | Vernon Williams | 134 | 3.9 | |
| Liberal Democrats | Dave Raval | 117 | 3.4 | |
| Majority | | 1,311 | | |
| Turnout | | 3,459 | 39.6 | |
| Labour hold | | Swing | | |
| Labour hold | | Swing | | |
| Labour hold | | Swing | | |

=== Lea Bridge ===
Hackney Council elections, 2014: Lea Bridge
| Party | Candidate | Votes | % | ±% |
|---|---|---|---|---|
| Labour | Margaret Gordon | 2,331 | 59.4 | |
| Labour | Ian Rathbone | 2,147 | 54.8 | |
| Labour | Deniz Oguzkanli | 2,073 | 52.9 | |
| Green | Ruth Jenkins | 1,055 | 26.9 | |
| Green | Douglas Earl | 985 | 25.1 | |
| Green | David Mercer | 859 | 21.9 | |
| Conservative | Linda Kelly | 391 | 10.0 | |
| Conservative | Elyas Mangera | 310 | 7.9 | |
| Conservative | Piotr Turbak | 197 | 5.0 | |
| Liberal Democrats | Jeffrey Shenker | 175 | 4.5 | |
| Liberal Democrats | Robert Hastings | 169 | 4.3 | |
| TUSC | Annoesjka Valent | 161 | 4.1 | |
| Liberal Democrats | Gita Jacobson | 157 | 4.0 | |
| Majority | | 1,018 | | |
| Turnout | | 3,921 | 39.5 | |
| Labour hold | | Swing | | |
| Labour hold | | Swing | | |
| Labour hold | | Swing | | |

=== London Fields ===
Hackney Council elections, 2014: London Fields
| Party | Candidate | Votes | % | ±% |
|---|---|---|---|---|
| Labour | Anntoinette Bramble | 2,153 | 61.3 | |
| Labour | M Can Ozsen | 1,915 | 54.6 | |
| Labour | Emma Plouviez | 1,891 | 53.9 | |
| Green | Fatemeh Beyad | 857 | 24.4 | |
| Green | Alexandra Olive | 761 | 21.7 | |
| Green | Daniel Theophanous | 625 | 17.8 | |
| Liberal Democrats | Sandra Driver | 331 | 9.4 | |
| Conservative | David Dodkin | 321 | 9.1 | |
| Conservative | Alexander Ellis | 313 | 8.9 | |
| Conservative | Michael Doudeskos | 297 | 8.5 | |
| TUSC | Fero Firat | 188 | 5.4 | |
| Liberal Democrats | Tom Osborn | 180 | 5.1 | |
| Liberal Democrats | Charles Jacobson | 138 | 3.9 | |
| TUSC | Diana Swingler | 120 | 3.4 | |
| Majority | | | | |
| Turnout | | 3,510 | 40.6 | |
| Labour hold | | Swing | | |
| Labour hold | | Swing | | |
| Labour hold | | Swing | | |

=== Shacklewell ===
Hackney Council election, 2014: Shacklewell
| Party | Candidate | Votes | % | ±% |
|---|---|---|---|---|
| Labour | Michelle Gregory | 1,468 | 60.9 | |
| Labour | Richard Lufkin | 1,344 | 55.8 | |
| Green | Joel Sharples | 594 | 24.6 | |
| Green | Hugh Grant-Peterkin | 550 | 22.8 | |
| Conservative | Mark Aussenberg | 132 | 5.5 | |
| Liberal Democrats | Simon Molloy | 125 | 5.2 | |
| Liberal Democrats | Jamie Chamberlain | 110 | 4.6 | |
| Conservative | Agnieszka Rolkiewicz | 107 | 4.4 | |
| Majority | | | | |
| Turnout | | 2,410 | 39.3 | |
| Labour hold | | Swing | | |
| Labour hold | | Swing | | |

=== Springfield ===
Hackney Council elections, 2014: Springfield
| Party | Candidate | Votes | % | ±% |
|---|---|---|---|---|
| Conservative | Simche Steinberger | 2,145 | 47.9 | |
| Conservative | Michael Levy | 2,144 | 47.8 | |
| Conservative | Harvey Odze | 2,025 | 45.2 | |
| Labour | Ben Alden-Falconer | 1,708 | 38.1 | |
| Labour | David Larkin | 1,678 | 37.4 | |
| Labour | Michael Jones | 1,605 | 35.8 | |
| Green | Christine Bacon | 384 | 8.6 | |
| Green | Noah Birksted-Breen | 317 | 7.1 | |
| Green | Daniel Stern | 313 | 7.0 | |
| Liberal Democrats | Mary O'Brien | 148 | 3.3 | |
| Liberal Democrats | Dennis Donovan | 127 | 2.8 | |
| Liberal Democrats | Stuart Round | 93 | 2.1 | |
| Majority | | | | |
| Turnout | | 4,481 | 46.8 | |
| Conservative hold | | Swing | | |
| Conservative hold | | Swing | | |
| Conservative hold | | Swing | | |

=== Stamford Hill West ===
Hackney Council election, 2014: Stamford Hill West
| Party | Candidate | Votes | % | ±% |
|---|---|---|---|---|
| Labour | Rosemary Sales | 1,105 | 45.8 | |
| Conservative | Benzion Papier | 953 | 39.5 | |
| Conservative | Bernard Aussenberg | 941 | 39.0 | |
| Labour | Joe Walker | 886 | 36.7 | |
| Green | Cedric Knight | 249 | 10.3 | |
| Green | Craig Bayne | 237 | 9.8 | |
| Liberal Democrats | Noel Christopher O'Brien | 89 | 3.7 | |
| Liberal Democrats | Mark Smulian | 44 | 1.8 | |
| Majority | | | | |
| Turnout | | 2,413 | 40.4 | |
| Labour gain from Conservative | | Swing | | |
| Conservative hold | | Swing | | |

=== Stoke Newington ===
Hackney Council elections, 2014: Stoke Newington
| Party | Candidate | Votes | % | ±% |
|---|---|---|---|---|
| Labour | Louisa Thomson | 2,576 | 58.5 | |
| Labour | Susan Fajana-Thomas | 2,330 | 52.9 | |
| Labour | Mete Coban | 2,297 | 52.2 | |
| Green | Danny Bates | 1,270 | 28.9 | |
| Green | Krysia Williams | 1,143 | 26.0 | |
| Green | Alexander Goodman | 1,027 | 23.3 | |
| Conservative | Irene Lewington | 319 | 7.2 | |
| Liberal Democrats | Jan Morgan | 278 | 6.3 | |
| Conservative | Lillian Odze | 224 | 5.1 | |
| Conservative | Agnieszka Wypych | 212 | 4.8 | |
| Liberal Democrats | Imtyaz Lunat | 206 | 4.7 | |
| Liberal Democrats | Richard Morgan-Ash | 190 | 4.3 | |
| TUSC | Michael Cotter | 173 | 3.9 | |
| Majority | | | | |
| Turnout | | 4,402 | 43.8 | |
| Labour hold | | Swing | | |
| Labour hold | | Swing | | |
| Labour hold | | Swing | | |

=== Victoria ===
Hackney Council elections, 2014: Victoria
| Party | Candidate | Votes | % | ±% |
|---|---|---|---|---|
| Labour | Will Brett | 2,096 | 61.5 | |
| Labour | Katie Hanson | 2,059 | 60.4 | |
| Labour | Geoff Taylor | 1,921 | 56.4 | |
| Green | Helen Roberts | 640 | 18.8 | |
| Green | Zoe Hall | 586 | 17.2 | |
| Green | Wendy Robinson | 572 | 16.8 | |
| Conservative | Winifred Saunders | 278 | 8.2 | |
| Conservative | Shahi Dewan | 269 | 7.9 | |
| UKIP | Sheila Priest | 256 | 7.5 | |
| Liberal Democrats | Heather James | 186 | 5.5 | |
| Liberal Democrats | Ian Gaskin | 165 | 4.8 | |
| Conservative | Rumi Begum | 151 | 4.4 | |
| Liberal Democrats | Theodore Jacobson | 114 | 3.3 | |
| Majority | | | | |
| Turnout | | 3,407 | 38.0 | |
| Labour hold | | Swing | | |
| Labour hold | | Swing | | |
| Labour hold | | Swing | | |

=== Woodberry Down ===
Hackney Council election, 2014: Woodberry Down
| Party | Candidate | Votes | % | ±% |
|---|---|---|---|---|
| Labour | Jon Burke | 1,653 | 63.7 | |
| Labour | Caroline Selman | 1,480 | 57.1 | |
| Conservative | Efrayim Goldstein | 460 | 17.7 | |
| Conservative | Chaya Odze | 419 | 16.2 | |
| Green | Karen Moss | 305 | 11.8 | |
| Green | Anna Hughes | 281 | 10.8 | |
| Liberal Democrats | Topsy Coffer | 108 | 4.2 | |
| Liberal Democrats | Myall Hornsby | 78 | 3.0 | |
| Majority | | | | |
| Turnout | | 2,594 | 40.8 | |
| Labour hold | | Swing | | |
| Labour hold | | Swing | | |
