= Lordship (ward) =

- Former electoral ward for the Hackney London Borough Council
- Lordship ward boundaries
- Borough: Hackney
- County: Greater London
- Population: xxx (2011)
- Electorate: 7,694 (2010)

Former electoral ward
- Created: 2002
- Abolished: 2014
- Councillors: 3
- ONS code: 00AMGN
- GSS code: E05000243

Lordship was a ward in the London Borough of Hackney and area forms part of the Hackney North and Stoke Newington constituency.

The ward returns three councillors to Hackney London Borough Council, with elections every four years. At the previous election on 6 May 2010 Bernard Aussenberg (Conservative Party), and Labour Party candidates Edward Brown and Daniel Stevens, were returned. Turnout was 62%; with 4,803 votes cast.

On 11 April 2014, Cllr Stevens resigned leaving a vacancy until the council elections are fought on new ward boundaries in May.

In 2001, Lordship ward had a total population of 11,288. This compares with the average ward population within the borough of 10,674.
