= Clissold (ward) =

Ward in the London Borough of Hackney

- Electoral ward for the Hackney London Borough Council
- Clissold ward boundaries since 2014
- Borough: Hackney
- County: Greater London
- Population: 12,581 (2021)
- Electorate: 9,430 (2022)
- Area: 1.024 square kilometres (0.395 sq mi)

Current electoral ward
- Created: 1965
- Number of members: 3
- Councillors: Sade Etti; Frank Baffour; Fliss Premru
- GSS code: E05009369 (2014–present}

Clissold is a ward in the London Borough of Hackney. The name is derived from Clissold Crescent and the ward also borders Clissold Park in the neighbouring Lordship ward both of which form part of the Hackney North and Stoke Newington constituency. The ward has existed since the creation of the borough on 1 April 1965 and was first used in the 1964 elections. The boundaries of the ward from May 2014 are revised and will take in Clissold Park. Clissold has the highest percentage of residents cycling to work of all wards in London.

At the 2011 Census, this ward had a population of 12,212.

== Geography ==
Clissold is a ward in the London Borough of Hackney, located in the north-west of the borough. It borders the wards of Stoke Newington, Lordship, and New River, and lies close to the boundary with the London Borough of Islington. The ward includes residential areas around Stoke Newington Church Street and Green Lanes, and from 2014 its boundaries were revised to incorporate Clissold Park.

== History ==
The ward takes its name from Clissold Crescent and Clissold Park, which itself is named after the Clissold family, associated with the historic Clissold House located within the park. The area formed part of the ancient parish of Stoke Newington, which developed from a rural village into a suburban district during the 19th century. Clissold ward has existed since the creation of the London Borough of Hackney in 1965 and was first used in the 1964 local elections.

== Demographics ==
At the 2011 Census, Clissold ward had a population of 12,212. The area is characterised by a diverse population, with a mix of ethnic backgrounds and a relatively young age profile compared to the national average. The ward has a high proportion of working-age residents and is known for a significant number of professionals and families. Housing consists of a mix of Victorian and Edwardian terraced homes, purpose-built flats, and more recent developments. The area has experienced notable demographic change in recent decades, associated with wider patterns of urban regeneration and population growth in Hackney.

== Transport ==
Clissold ward is well connected to central London by public transport. Nearby railway stations include Stoke Newington and Rectory Road, providing London Overground services. Numerous bus routes serve the area, linking it to central London and surrounding districts. The ward has the highest proportion of residents cycling to work of any ward in London, reflecting both its proximity to central areas and the availability of cycling infrastructure.

== Amenities and character ==
The ward is centred around Clissold Park, a large public green space featuring lakes, sports facilities, a café, and a small animal enclosure. Stoke Newington Church Street, located nearby, provides a range of independent shops, cafés, and restaurants, contributing to the area’s reputation as a vibrant and desirable residential neighbourhood. The ward is often associated with a strong community identity and a mix of long-standing residents and newer arrivals.

== Politics ==
Clissold forms part of the Hackney North and Stoke Newington. The ward has historically returned councillors from the Labour Party, reflecting broader political trends in the borough. Elections are held as part of Hackney London Borough Council, with three councillors representing the ward. Boundary changes introduced in 2014 altered the ward’s extent, including the addition of Clissold Park.

== Recent developments ==
Like much of Hackney, Clissold has undergone significant change since the late 20th century. Rising property values and increased demand for housing have contributed to processes often described as gentrification. These changes have brought investment and new amenities to the area, while also raising concerns about affordability and the displacement of long-term residents.

== Hackney council elections since 2014 ==
There was a revision of ward boundaries in Hackney in 2014.

=== 2022 election ===
The election took place on 5 May 2022.

2022 Hackney London Borough Council election: Clissold
Party	Candidate	Votes	%	±%
Labour	Sade Etti	2,188	65.9	
Labour	Frank Baffour	1,869	56.3	
Labour	Fliss Premru	1,740	52.4	
Green	Feodora Rayner	1,120	33.7	
Green	Marie Remy	793	23.9	
Green	Reiner Tegtmeyer	564	17.0	
Women's Equality	Tabitha Morton	489	14.7	
Liberal Democrats	Heather James	392	11.8	
Conservative	Diana Mikolajewska	232	7.0	
Ind. Network	Kelly Reid	220	6.6	
Conservative	Monika Nierzejewski	181	5.4	
Conservative	Julia Zolnierzak	179	5.4	
Majority		1,068		
Majority		749		
Majority		620		
Turnout			38.1	
Labour hold		Swing		
Labour hold		Swing		
Labour hold		Swing		

=== 2019 by-election ===
A by-election was held on 12 December 2019, following the resignation of Ned Hercock.

Clissold ward by-election, 12 December 2019
Party	Candidate	Votes	%	±%
Labour	Kofo David	3,784	56.3	
Green	Marie Remy	1,597	23.8	
Liberal Democrats	Teresa Clark	612	9.1	
Conservative	Carmen Williams	440	6.5	
Women's Equality	Tabitha Morton	287	4.3	
Labour hold		Swing		

=== 2018 election ===
The election took place on 3 May 2018.

2018 Hackney London Borough Council election: Clissold
Party	Candidate	Votes	%	±%
Labour	Sophie Cameron	2,548	69.3	
Labour	Sade Etti	2,157	58.6	
Labour	Ned Hercock	2,055	55.9	
Green	Marie Remy	889	24.2	
Green	Jim Cresswell	839	22.8	
Green	Adam Lawson	541	14.7	
Liberal Democrats	Sylvia Anderson	427	11.6	
Liberal Democrats	Simon De Deney	301	8.2	
Liberal Democrats	Marcia Roberts	264	7.2	
Conservative	Pamela Sills	186	5.1	
Conservative	Chaya Odze	184	5.0	
Conservative	Andrew White	170	4.6	
Majority				
Turnout			39.0	
Labour hold		Swing		
Labour hold		Swing		
Labour hold		Swing		

=== 2014 election ===
The election took place on 22 May 2014.

2014 Hackney London Borough Council election: Clissold
Party	Candidate	Votes	%	±%
Labour	Sophie Cameron	2,519	55.7	
Labour	Ned Hercock	2,103		
Labour	Sade Etti	2,010		
Green	Charlotte George	1,287	28.5	
Green	Griffin Carpenter	1,125		
Green	Kirsty Styles	1,040		
Liberal Democrats	Sylvia Anderson	410	9.1	
Liberal Democrats	Simon de Deney	345		
Conservative	Alison Cook	305	6.7	
Conservative	Glenda Aussenberg	263		
Liberal Democrats	Tony Harms	207		
Conservative	Ita Steinberger	207		
Labour hold		Swing		
Labour hold		Swing		
Labour hold		Swing		

== 2002–2014 Hackney council elections ==
There was a revision of ward boundaries in Hackney in 2002. The ward returns three councillors to Hackney London Borough Council, with elections every four years. At the previous election on 6 May 2010 Karen Alcock, Wendy Mitchell, and Linda Smith; all Labour Party candidates were elected. Turnout was 65%; and 5,600 votes were cast. In 2001, Clissold ward had a total population of 10,433. This compares with the average ward population within the borough of 10,674.

=== 2010 election ===
The election took place on 6 May 2010.

2010 Hackney London Borough Council election: Clissold
Party	Candidate	Votes	%	±%
Labour	Karen Alcock	2,979	47.7	
Labour	Wendy Mitchell	2,266		
Labour	Linda Smith	2,083		
Green	Pippa Lane	1,469	23.5	
Green	Peter Jones	1,425		
Green	Matthew Sellwood	1,291		
Liberal Democrats	Sylvia Anderson	1,290	20.6	
Liberal Democrats	Jan Morgan	796		
Liberal Democrats	Keren Kohn-Souza	683		
Conservative	Samuel Ibbott	509	8.1	
Conservative	Irene Lewington	369		
Conservative	Ita Steinberger	283		
Labour gain from Green		Swing		
Labour hold		Swing		
Labour hold		Swing		

=== 2006 election ===
The election took place on 4 May 2006.

2006 Hackney London Borough Council election: Clissold
Party	Candidate	Votes	%	±%
Green	Mischa Borris	1,240	38.2	
Labour	Karen Alcock	1,175	36.2	
Labour	Linda Smith	1,127		
Green	Keith Magnum	1,066		
Labour	Thomas Fajana	1,050		
Green	Charlotte Woodworth	847		
Liberal Democrats	Sylvia Anderson	365	11.2	
Respect	Asli Demirel	262	8.1	
Liberal Democrats	Habiba Bham	245		
Respect	Sasha Simic	216		
Liberal Democrats	Abraham Jacobson	212		
Conservative	Martin Bakewell	208	6.4	
Conservative	Vanessa Ford	185		
Conservative	Irene Lewington	135		
Turnout			40.8	
Green gain from Labour		Swing		
Labour hold		Swing		
Labour hold		Swing		

=== 2002 election ===
The election took place on 2 May 2002, on new ward boundaries.

2002 Hackney London Borough Council election: Clissold
Party	Candidate	Votes	%	±%
Labour	Kevin Moorhouse	1,009	34.1	
Labour	Karen Alcock	992		
Labour	Asabgwiy Nkafu	815		
Green	Ian Wingrove	667	22.5	
Liberal Democrats	David Ash	601	20.3	
Socialist Alliance	Paul Foot	487	16.4	
Liberal Democrats	Richard Wilson	396		
Liberal Democrats	Abraham Jacobson	335		
Conservative	Shlomo Odze	125	4.2	
Conservative	Comfort Tawiah	111		
Conservative	James Tawiah	109		
CPA	Linda Tobie	73	2.5	
Labour hold		Swing		
Labour hold		Swing		
Labour hold		Swing		

== 1978–2002 Hackney council elections ==
There was a revision of ward boundaries in Hackney in 1978.

== 1965–1978 Hackney council elections ==
Clissold ward has existed since the creation of the London Borough of Hackney on 1 April 1965. It was first used in the 1964 elections, with an electorate of 9,029, returning three councillors.
