= Leabridge (Hackney ward) =

Electoral division in London

- Former electoral ward for the Hackney London Borough Council
- Leabridge (Hackney) ward boundaries from 2002 to 2014
- Borough: Hackney
- County: Greater London
- Population: 14,039 (2011)
- Electorate: 9,032 (2010)
- Area: 1.0636 square kilometres (0.4107 sq mi)

Former electoral ward
- Created: 1965
- Abolished: 2014
- ONS code: 00AMGM (2002–2014)
- GSS code: E05000242 (2002–2014)

Leabridge was a ward in the London Borough of Hackney from 1965 to 2014.

It roughly corresponded to the Lea Bridge district of London, and is distinct from the Lea Bridge ward in the neighbouring London Borough of Waltham Forest. It is part of Hackney North and Stoke Newington constituency. The ward has existed since the creation of the borough on 1 April 1965 and was first used in the 1964 elections.

== 2002–2014 ==
There was a revision of ward boundaries in Hackney in 2002. The ward returns three councillors to Hackney London Borough Council, with elections every four years. At the last elections on 6 May 2010, Linda Kelly, Deniz Oguzkanli, and Ian Rathbone, all Labour Party candidates, were returned. Turnout was 55%; with 4,999 votes cast. Rathbone is a former speaker of the borough. Kelly left Labour and joined the Tories on 18 May 2011.

In 2001, Leabridge ward had a total population of 9,863 and was the ward with the fewest residents in Hackney. At the 2011 Census the population had increased to 14,039. This compares with the average ward population within the borough of 10,674.

Hackney wards are redrawn and the ward is abolished from the May 2014 election. Most of the Leabridge ward becomes part of a new ward of Lea Bridge with part in the north going to Springfield. The new ward of Lea Bridge also includes part of the abolished Chatham ward.

== 1978–2002 ==
There was a revision of ward boundaries in Hackney in 1978.

== 1965–1978 ==
Leabridge ward has existed since the creation of the London Borough of Hackney on 1 April 1965. It was first used in the 1964 elections, with an electorate of 8,725, returning three councillors.

=== 1968 election ===
The election took place on 9 May 1968.

1968 Hackney London Borough Council election: Leabridge (3)
Party	Candidate	Votes	%	±%
Conservative	W. Whitaker	1,128		
Conservative	C. Sills	1,123		
Conservative	R. Atkins	1,113		
Labour	A. Taylor	907		
Labour	G. Ross	897		
Labour	R. Heisler	897		
Turnout				
Conservative gain from Labour		Swing		
Conservative gain from Labour		Swing		
Conservative gain from Labour		Swing		

=== 1964 election ===
The election took place on 7 May 1964.

1968 Hackney London Borough Council election: Leabridge (3)
Party	Candidate	Votes	%	±%
Labour	A. Harrison	922		
Labour	R. Spong	916		
Labour	R. Heisler	904		
Conservative	P. Bowyer	390		
Conservative	C. Hegerty	347		
Liberal	A. Evans	322		
Conservative	R. Atkins	315		
Liberal	A. Hurd	232		
Liberal	G. Watts	221		
Turnout		1,518	17.4	
Labour win (new seat)				
Labour win (new seat)				
Labour win (new seat)				
