= Queensbridge (ward) =

Electoral ward in England

- Former electoral ward for the Hackney London Borough Council
- Queensbridge ward boundaries from 2002 to 2014
- Borough: Hackney
- County: Greater London
- Population: 13,670 (2011)
- Electorate: 9,157 (2010)
- Area: 1.0797 square kilometres (0.4169 sq mi)

Former electoral ward
- Created: 1965
- Abolished: 2014
- ONS code: 00AMGQ (2002–2014)
- GSS code: E05000245 (2002–2014)

Queensbridge was a ward in the London Borough of Hackney, forming part of the Hackney South and Shoreditch constituency.

The ward, renamed London Fields as of the 2014 local elections, returns three councillors to Borough Council, with an election every four years. At the election on 6 May 2010, Emma Plouviez, Tom Price, and Patrick Vernon, all Labour Party candidates, were returned. Turnout was 58%, with 5,360 votes cast.

In 2001, Queensbridge ward had a total population of 10,165, near the average ward population within the borough of 10,674. The population at the 2011 Census was 13,670.

The ward is part of the neighbourhood of Shoreditch, and includes London Fields and Broadway Market.

== 2002–2014 Hackney council elections ==
There was a revision of ward boundaries in Hackney in 2002.

== 1978–2002 Hackney council elections ==
There was a revision of ward boundaries in Hackney in 1978.
