= De Beauvoir (ward) =

Electoral ward in London, England

- Electoral ward for the Hackney London Borough Council
- De Beauvoir ward boundaries since 2014
- Borough: Hackney
- County: Greater London
- Population: 9,195 (2021)
- Electorate: 6,634 (2022)
- Major settlements: De Beauvoir Town
- Area: 0.6005 square kilometres (0.2319 sq mi)

Current electoral ward
- Created: 1965
- Number of members: 2
- Councillors: Joe Walker; Jasmine Martins
- GSS code: E05009371

De Beauvoir /dəˈboʊvwɑːr/ is a ward encompassing all of De Beauvoir Town and small part of Dalston in the London Borough of Hackney. The ward has existed since the creation of the borough on 1 April 1965 and was first used in the 1964 elections. The boundaries of the ward were revised in 2014.

== From 2014 ==
In 2014 the ward boundary was revised, with a small area east of Kingsland Basin transferred to Haggerston Ward.

=== 2024 by-election ===
The by-election was held on 2 May 2024, following the resignation of Polly Billington. It took place on the same day as the 2024 London mayoral election, the 2024 London Assembly election and 14 other borough council by-elections across London.

2024 De Beauvoir by-election
Party	Candidate	Votes	%	±%
Labour	Jasmine Martins	1,316		
Green	Antoinette Fernandez	1,197		
Conservative	Tareke Gregg	174		
Liberal Democrats	Thrusie Cahill	129		
Majority		119		
Turnout		2,844	43.0	
Labour hold		Swing		

=== 2022 by-election ===
A by-election took place on 7 July 2022, following the resignation of Tom Dewey.

2022 De Beauvoir by-election
Party	Candidate	Votes	%	±%
Labour	Joe Walker	758	41.5	−15.5
Green	Tyrone Scott	731	40.3	+18.3
Liberal Democrats	Thrusie Maurseth-Cahill	133	7.3	−5.0
Ind. Network	Kelly Reid	83	4.6	−3.8
Conservative	Oliver Hall	82	4.5	N/A
Women's Equality	Kristal Bayliss	27	1.5	N/A
Majority		27	1.2	
Turnout		1,822	27.6	
Labour hold		Swing	▼16.9	

=== 2022 election ===
The election took place on 5 May 2022.

2022 Hackney London Borough Council election: De Beauvoir (2)
Party	Candidate	Votes	%	±%
Labour	Polly Billington	1,400	73.0	
Labour	Tom Dewey	1,102	57.5	
Green	Heather Finlay	538	28.1	
Liberal Democrats	John Hodgson	302	15.7	
Green	Nicholas Lee	288	15.0	
Ind. Network	Samantha May	205	10.7	
Majority		862		
Majority		564		
Turnout			33.4	
Labour hold		Swing		
Labour hold		Swing		

=== 2018 election ===
The election took place on 3 May 2018.

2018 Hackney London Borough Council election: De Beauvoir (2)
Party	Candidate	Votes	%	±%
Labour	Polly Billington	1,448	62.6	
Labour	James Peters	1,153	49.8	
Green	Heather Finlay	451	19.5	
Liberal Democrats	Darren Martin	336	14.5	
Liberal Democrats	Pippa Morgan	316	13.7	
Green	Nicholas Thorp	210	9.1	
Conservative	Amina Lunat	168	7.3	
Conservative	Mohamednasar Lunat	138	6.0	
Duma Polska	Marlena Wendel	24	1.0	
Majority				
Turnout			34.6	
Labour hold		Swing		
Labour hold		Swing		

=== 2014 election ===
The election took place on 22 May 2014.

2014 Hackney London Borough Council election: De Beauvoir (2)
Party	Candidate	Votes	%	±%
Labour	Laura Bunt	1,336	57.5	
Labour	James Peters	1,245	53.6	
Conservative	Cameron Lucas Brown	433	18.6	
Green	Catherine Ryan	476	20.5	
Green	Nicholas Lee	418	18.0	
Conservative	Weronika Zolnierzak	342	14.7	
Liberal Democrats	Rebecca Freeman	189	8.1	
Liberal Democrats	Cynthia Dimineux	150	6.5	
TUSC	Chris Newby	58	2.5	
Majority		769	33.1	
Labour win (new boundaries)				
Labour win (new boundaries)				

== 2002–2014 ==
The ward returns two councillors to Hackney Council, with an election every four years. In 2011, De Beauvoir ward had a total population of 8,494 people. This compares with the average ward population within the borough of 10,674.

== 1978–2002 ==
There was a revision of ward boundaries in Hackney in 1978.

=== 1988 by-election ===
A by-election was held on 25 February 1988, following the resignation of John Lettice.

1988 De Beauvoir by-election
Party	Candidate	Votes	%	±%
Liberal	Thomas A. Brake	613		
Labour	David J. F. Pollock	512		
Conservative	Christopher D. Sills	398		
Green	Jonathan Edwards	127		
Majority		101		
Turnout		7,020	23.6	
Liberal gain from Labour		Swing		

== 1965–1978 ==
De Beauvoir ward has existed since the creation of the London Borough of Hackney on 1 April 1965.

=== 1964 election ===
It was first used in the 1964 elections, with an electorate of 7,678, returning three councillors.

1964 Hackney London Borough Council election: De Beauvoir (3)
Party	Candidate	Votes	%	±%
Labour	A. P. Rose	837		
Labour	J. G. Jepson	833		
Labour	A. Samuels	822		
Liberal	H. J. Newbrook	286		
Liberal	E. A. Newbrook	283		
Liberal	R. W. Walker	281		
Conservative	W. J. Haste	196		
Conservative	O. T. Kenway	192		
Conservative	W. Sandler	189		
Independent Labour	E. J. Scott	26		
Turnout		1,364	17.8	
Labour win (new seat)				
Labour win (new seat)				
Labour win (new seat)				
