= Chatham (ward) =

Coordinates: 51.547°N 0.048°W

- Former electoral ward for the Hackney London Borough Council
- Chatham ward boundaries from 2002 to 2014
- Borough: Hackney
- County: Greater London
- Population: 13,232 (2011)
- Electorate: 8,781 (2010)
- Area: 0.9075 square kilometres (0.3504 sq mi)

Former electoral ward
- Created: 1965
- Abolished: 2014
- Replaced by: Homerton, King's Park, Lea Bridge
- ONS code: 00AMGC (2002–2014)
- GSS code: E05000233 (2002–2014)

Chatham was a ward in the London Borough of Hackney from 1965 to 2014. It formed part of the Hackney South and Shoreditch constituency. The population of this ward at the 2011 Census was 13,232. For the May 2014 election, the ward was replaced by a new Homerton ward, with some sections going to Lea Bridge ward and Hackney Wick ward.

== 2002–2014 ==
There was a revision of ward boundaries in Hackney in 2002. The ward returned three councillors to Hackney London Borough Council, with an election every four years. In 2001, Chatham ward had a total population of 10,722. This compares with the average ward population within the borough of 10,674.

=== 2010 election ===
The election on 6 May 2010 took place on the same day as the United Kingdom general election.

2010 Hackney London Borough Council election: Chatham (3)
| Party | Candidate | Votes | % | ±% |
|---|---|---|---|---|
| Labour | Guy Nicholson | 2,738 | 55.0 | |
| Labour | Sally Mulready | 2,605 | | |
| Labour | Luke Akehurst | 2,591 | | |
| Liberal Democrats | Mahfuzur Rahman | 901 | 18.1 | |
| Green | Polly Lane | 799 | 16.1 | |
| Liberal Democrats | Tim Seydali | 789 | | |
| Conservative | Ben Mascall | 539 | 10.8 | |
| Green | Cedric Knight | 518 | | |
| Green | John Devaney | 495 | | |
| Conservative | Carl McClean | 437 | | |
| Conservative | Lornette Spencer | 357 | | |
| Turnout | | 4,771 | 54 | |
| Labour hold | | Swing | | |
| Labour hold | | Swing | | |
| Labour hold | | Swing | | |

=== 2006 election ===
The election took place on 4 May 2006.

2006 Hackney London Borough Council election: Chatham (3)
| Party | Candidate | Votes | % | ±% |
|---|---|---|---|---|
| Labour | William Nicholson | 1,108 | 45.8 | |
| Labour | Sally Mulready | 1,108 | | |
| Labour | Luke Akehurst | 1,005 | | |
| Green | Mark Douglas | 512 | 21.1 | |
| Liberal Democrats | Glyn Green | 402 | 16.6 | |
| Liberal Democrats | Michael McCairn | 323 | | |
| Conservative | Yann Leclercq | 215 | 8.9 | |
| Conservative | Harold Symons | 213 | | |
| Conservative | Bixby Palmer | 187 | | |
| Christian | Olumide Awobowale | 184 | 7.6 | |
| Christian | Coral Thompson | 125 | | |
| Christian | William Thompson | 98 | | |
| Turnout | | | 29.7 | |
| Labour hold | | Swing | | |
| Labour hold | | Swing | | |
| Labour hold | | Swing | | |

== 1978–2002 ==
There was a revision of ward boundaries in Hackney in 1978.

== 1965–1978 ==
Chatham ward existed since the creation of the London Borough of Hackney on 1 April 1965.

=== 1964 election ===
It was first used in the 1964 elections, with an electorate of 8,952, returning three councillors unopposed..

1964 Hackney London Borough Council election: Chatham (3)
| Party | Candidate | Votes | % | ±% |
|---|---|---|---|---|
| Labour | E. G. H. Millen | Uncontested | | |
| Labour | R. E. Owen | Uncontested | | |
| Labour | P. G. Sylvester | Uncontested | | |
| Turnout | | n/a | n/a | |
| Labour win (new seat) | | | | |
| Labour win (new seat) | | | | |
| Labour win (new seat) | | | | |
