= King's Park (ward) =

Electoral ward in Hackney, England

- Electoral ward for the Hackney London Borough Council
- King's Park ward boundaries since 2014
- Borough: Hackney
- County: Greater London
- Population: 13,061 (2021)
- Electorate: 9,322 (2022)
- Area: 1.924 square kilometres (0.743 sq mi)

Current electoral ward
- Created: 1965
- Number of members: 3
- Councillors: Jasmine O'Connor; Emmanuel Onapa; Abi Kingston
- ONS code: 00AMGL (2002–2014)
- GSS code: E05000241 (2002–2014); E05009379 (2014–present)

King's Park (from May 1978 to May 2002 Kings Park) is a ward in the London Borough of Hackney and forms part of the Hackney South and Shoreditch constituency. The ward is subject to minor boundary changes taking place in May 2014. It returns three councillors.

== From 2014 ==
Hackney wards are redrawn from May 2014. The new King's Park ward is mostly unchanged, expanding to the southwest to take in part of the abolished Chatham ward. It has an allocation of three councillors.

=== 2022 election ===
The election took place on 5 May 2022.

2022 Hackney London Borough Council election: King's Park (3)
Party	Candidate	Votes	%	±%
Labour	Sharon Patrick	1,948		
Labour	Lynne Troughton	1,739		
Labour	Ali Sadek	1,726		
Green	Josephine Wilby	931		
Green	Peter Jones	682		
Green	Donell Walter	604		
Majority				
Turnout				
Labour hold		Swing		
Labour hold		Swing		
Labour hold		Swing		

=== 2018 election ===
The election took place on 3 May 2018.

2018 Hackney London Borough Council election: King's Park (3)
Party	Candidate	Votes	%	±%
Labour	Sharon Patrick	2,325		
Labour	Tom Rahilly	2,213		
Labour	Rebecca Rennison	2,017		
Green	Zoe Oates	486		
Green	James Morgan	472		
Green	Alex Oates	373		
Conservative	Yusuf Lunat	203		
Liberal Democrats	Joe Bell	194		
Conservative	Lumumba Morgan	171		
Liberal Democrats	Sebastian Bayer	144		
Conservative	Winifred Saunders	124		
Liberal Democrats	John Hodgson	116		
Independent	Vernon Williams	91		
Majority				
Turnout				
Labour hold		Swing		
Labour hold		Swing		
Labour hold		Swing		

== 2002–2014 ==
There was a revision of ward boundaries in Hackney in 2002 and a new King's Park ward was created.

The ward returns three councillors to Hackney London Borough Council, with an election every four years. King's Park ward has a total population of 10,923, increasing to 11,098 at the 2011 Census. This compares with the average ward population within the borough of 10,674.

=== 2010 election ===
At the previous election on 6 May 2010 Julius Asabgwiy Nkafu, Sharon Patrick, and Saleem Siddiqui all Labour Party candidates, were returned. Turnout was 58%; with 4,346 votes cast.

== 1978–2002 ==
Kings Park ward was created for the 1978 local elections, with an electorate of 4,373.
