= Springfield (Hackney ward) =

- Electoral ward for the Hackney London Borough Council
- Springfield ward boundaries since 2014
- Borough: Hackney
- County: Greater London
- Population: 15,319 (2021)
- Electorate: 9,843 (2020)
- Area: 1.180 square kilometres (0.456 sq mi)

Current electoral ward
- Created: 1965
- Number of members: 3
- Councillors: Simche Steinberger; Michael Levy; Shaul Krautwirt
- ONS code: 00AMGR (2002–2014)
- GSS code: E05000246 (2002–2014); E05009383 (2014–present)

Springfield is a ward in the London Borough of Hackney occupying much of Upper Clapton and some of Stamford Hill; the ward is part of the Hackney North and Stoke Newington constituency. The name is derived from Springfield Park.

The ward returns three councillors to the Borough Council, with elections every four years. At the last election on 6 May 2010, Michael Levy and Simche Steinberger (both Conservative Party candidates); and Margaret Gordon (Labour Party) were returned. Turnout was 57%; with 3,993 votes cast.

== Demography ==
In 2001, Springfield ward had a total population of 10,854. This compares with the average ward population within the borough of 10,674. The population at the 2011 Census was 12,371.

== Hackney council elections since 2014 ==
There was a revision of ward boundaries in Hackney in 2014.

=== 2022 election ===
The election took place on 5 May 2022.

2022 Hackney London Borough Council election: Springfield
Party	Candidate	Votes	%	±%
Conservative	Simche Steinberger	2,273	61.4	
Conservative	Shaul Krautwirt	2,144	57.9	
Conservative	Michael Levy	2,102	56.8	
Labour	Christiana Ajiginni	1,269	34.3	
Labour	Michael Jones	1,179	31.9	
Labour	Laura Pascal	1,156	31.2	
Green	Celia Coram	272	7.3	
Green	Julie-Anne Hogbin	259	7.0	
Green	Noah Birksted-Breen	254	6.9	
Liberal Democrats	Sean Boylan	76	2.1	
Liberal Democrats	Clifford Gully	73	2.0	
Liberal Democrats	Mark Smulian	46	1.2	
Majority				
Turnout			40.2	
Conservative hold		Swing		
Conservative hold		Swing		
Conservative hold		Swing		

=== 2018 election ===
The election took place on 3 May 2018.

2018 Hackney London Borough Council election: Springfield
Party	Candidate	Votes	%	±%
Conservative	Simche Steinberger	2,040	47.5	−0.4
Conservative	Michael Levy	1,992	46.3	−1.5
Conservative	Harvey Odze	1,913	44.5	−0.7
Labour	Ali Dogan	1,724	40.1	+2.0
Labour	Shabaz Khan	1,632	38.0	+0.6
Labour	Joseph Walker	1,584	36.9	+1.1
Green	Ellie Keggin	376	8.7	+0.1
Green	Robert Rayner	260	6.0	−1.1
Green	Thomas Stern	230	5.4	−1.6
Majority				
Turnout			46.4	
Conservative hold		Swing		
Conservative hold		Swing		
Conservative hold		Swing		

=== 2014 election ===
The election took place on 22 May 2014.

2014 Hackney London Borough Council election: Springfield
Party	Candidate	Votes	%	±%
Conservative	Simche Steinberger	2,145	47.9	
Conservative	Michael Levy	2,144	47.8	
Conservative	Harvey Odze	2,025	45.2	
Labour	Ben Alden-Falconer	1,708	38.1	
Labour	David Larkin	1,678	37.4	
Labour	Michael Jones	1,605	35.8	
Green	Christine Bacon	384	8.6	
Green	Noah Birksted-Breen	317	7.1	
Green	Daniel Stern	313	7.0	
Liberal Democrats	Mary O'Brien	148	3.3	
Liberal Democrats	Dennis Donovan	127	2.8	
Liberal Democrats	Stuart Round	93	2.1	
Majority				
Turnout		4,481	46.8	
Conservative win (new boundaries)				
Conservative win (new boundaries)				
Conservative win (new boundaries)				

== 2002–2014 Hackney council elections ==
There was a revision of ward boundaries in Hackney in 2002.

== 1978–2002 Hackney council elections ==
There was a revision of ward boundaries in Hackney in 1978.
