= Murder of Leiby Kletzky =

2011 murder of Jewish boy in Brooklyn, New York, U.S.

Leiby Kletzky
- Kletzky in 2009
- Born: Yehudah Kletzky; July 29, 2002; 20 Av; Brooklyn, New York, U.S.
- Died: July 12, 2011 (aged 8); 10 Tammuz; Brooklyn, New York, U.S.
- Cause of death: Lethal drug cocktail; smothering
- Height: 4 ft 0 in (122 cm)
- Parent(s): Nachman Kletzky; Itta Esther (Esti) Forster Kletzky

On July 11, 2011, Leiby Kletzky, a Hasidic Jewish boy, was kidnapped as he walked home from his school day camp in the mainly Hasidic neighborhood of Borough Park, Brooklyn in New York City. Kletzky's disappearance sparked an all-out search by New York City police and a block-by-block search by up to 5,000 Orthodox Jewish volunteers from New York and other states coordinated by the Brooklyn South Shomrim volunteer civilian patrol.

His dismembered body was found in the Kensington apartment of Levi Aron, aged 35, and in a dumpster in another Brooklyn neighborhood, Greenwood Heights, on Wednesday morning July 13. Videos from surveillance cameras along the boy's route showed him meeting a man outside a dentist's office and then apparently getting into his car. The dentist's reception records led police to Aron at his apartment, where he showed them parts of the boy – and told them where he had dumped the rest of the body. The kidnapping and murder of the eight-year-old boy shocked the tight-knit Brooklyn Hasidic community, whose streets are considered safe.

Aron gave a 450-word handwritten confession to police after his arrest, but pleaded not guilty at his first court hearing. Before the case went to trial, on August 9, 2012, Aron pleaded guilty to one charge of second-degree murder and one charge of second-degree kidnapping as part of a plea bargain agreement worked out between prosecutors and defense attorneys. On August 29, Judge Neil Firetog sentenced Aron to 40 years to life in prison. The case drew comparisons to the 1979 kidnapping of six-year-old Etan Patz from nearby SoHo, who was abducted while walking to his school bus for the first time.

== Disappearance ==
Yehudah Kletzky, known as "Leiby", was the third of six children and only son of Nachman Kletzky and Esti Forster Kletzky, Boyaner Hasidim and residents of Borough Park. He was reported missing late Monday afternoon while walking home from a day camp held at his school, Yeshiva Boyan Tiferes Mordechai Shlomo. (Note: The school is named after Mordechai Shlomo Friedman, the Boyaner rebbe of New York.) Kletzky had begged his parents to let him walk home from the camp instead of taking the school bus. It was the first time that his parents allowed him to walk alone and they had practiced the route the day before; his mother waited for him at a predetermined point a few blocks away at 50th Street and 13th Avenue. The boy missed a turn upon leaving camp and headed in the wrong direction.

=== Search ===
Kletzky's mother called the Brooklyn South Shomrim volunteer civilian patrol to report a missing child at 6:14 p.m. The organization, which says it receives 10 calls of missing children per day, immediately checked candy stores, other shops, and homes of friends and relatives where the boy might have gone. By 8:30 p.m., Shomrim contacted the New York City Police Department (NYPD), which declared a Level 1 search. The police search involved canine units, mounted police, and police helicopters. On Tuesday morning, Brooklyn South Shomrim, together with Shomrim organizations in Crown Heights, Flatbush, and Williamsburg, made an all-out call for volunteers to join the search. Five thousand Orthodox Jewish volunteers from the local community and from other communities in the Tri-State area, joined in a block-by-block search. Bangladeshi residents of nearby Kensington also joined the search. State Assemblyman Dov Hikind posted a $5,000 reward for information leading to the return of the child, which was eventually increased to $100,000 by members of the community.

Meanwhile, Yaakov German, a Bobover Hasid and father of Kletzky's yeshiva rebbi, went door-to-door on Tuesday morning with his son to examine videos from surveillance cameras posted in stores and offices along the boy's route. The videos showed that after leaving his school at 1205 44th Street – between 12th and 13th Avenues – at about 5:05 p.m., Kletzky missed his turn at 13th Avenue, instead continuing up 44th Street. Other videos showed the boy walking by Shomrim Locksmith at 44th Street and 15th Avenue, and then along 44th Street at 17th Avenue. On 18th Avenue, the boy was seen talking to a man who then crossed the street and entered a dentist's office. When the man came out, Kletzky followed him and appeared to get into his car.

After examining the videos, police located the dentist, who alerted his receptionist, the wife of politician Simcha Eichenstein. She gave them the name and address of the suspect who had come in to pay his bill that day. After midnight on Tuesday, police also managed to identify the car in the surveillance video as a gold 1990 Honda Accord. Forty-five minutes later, two Flatbush volunteers searching for the missing boy in Kensington spotted the car and sent in the license plate number, which matched Aron's details. Police went to the suspect's apartment in Kensington around 2 a.m. Wednesday morning. They arrived to an open door, and when they asked Aron where the boy was, he allegedly nodded toward the kitchen, where the police found blood-soaked carving knives and bloody towels in bags. The boy's severed feet were found in the freezer. The suspect told police where to find the rest of the remains: In a red suitcase thrown in a dumpster on 20th Street between Fourth and Fifth Avenues. Aron was taken into police custody at 2:40 a.m. Wednesday morning.

=== Confession ===
According to a 450-word handwritten statement in which he confessed to killing the boy, Aron claimed that Kletzky had asked him for directions and accepted a ride, saying he wanted to be dropped off at a bookstore. Aron suggested that they drive together to a wedding in Monsey, New York; they returned around 11:20 p.m. Aron claimed that he planned to return the boy to his family on Tuesday, but when he saw the missing child posters the next day, he said he "panicked", returned to the apartment, and smothered the boy with a towel. Then he dismembered the body and stuffed it into bags, which he placed in a suitcase and left in a dumpster in another neighborhood.

A video from the security camera at the Ateres Charna wedding hall in Rockland County confirmed that Aron was at the wedding, but no sign is seen of Kletzky. A color surveillance video taken later that night at a Sunoco gas station on the Palisades Interstate Parkway showed Aron and Kletzky getting out of Aron's car and going into the bathroom. The video was time-stamped 8:15 p.m.

There was no evidence that the victim had been sexually abused. Aron was unknown to Kletzky before meeting the boy on the street.

=== Funeral ===
Kletzky's funeral, held in the parking lot of a Borough Park synagogue was attended by thousands of Orthodox Jews, many of whom traveled from throughout the Tri-State area to attend. Attendance was estimated at 8,000 by the Shomrim civilian patrol, and 10,000 by Arutz Sheva.

== Perpetrator ==
Levi Aron was an Orthodox Jew who grew up in Brooklyn. His father, Jack, worked at the Hasidic-owned B&H Photo in Brooklyn; his mother, Basya, died five or six years previously. Aron lived in the attic apartment of his parents' three-family home on the corner of Avenue C and East 2nd Street in the Kensington neighborhood. He was married twice; in 2004 he married Diana Diunov, an Israeli woman, and in 2007 he married Deborah M. Parnell of Tennessee, a divorced mother of two whom he had met online and with whom he moved to Memphis, where he worked as a security guard. Both marriages ended in divorce.

Aron worked as a clerk at a hardware-supply company in Brooklyn. He was described by his coworkers as quiet and socially awkward. Aron had injured his head when he was hit by a car while riding his bike at the age of 9 and suffered problems stemming from that accident. It is believed that this caused extreme shyness and neurotic behaviors with Aron in later life. He had no prior arrest record. He had been served with an order of protection in January 2007, and had received a fine for a seat belt violation and one speeding ticket. In Brooklyn, authorities cited a summons for public urination.

== Legal proceedings ==
=== Defense attorneys' statements ===
Aron appeared in Brooklyn Criminal Court on July 14, 2011, and pleaded not guilty. At the hearing, his lawyer stated that Aron "suffers from hallucinations" and "hears voices". The court ordered Aron to be sent to the prison ward at Bellevue Hospital Center for a psychiatric evaluation.

After Aron had been hospitalized, his lawyers stated that he was "seeking to quiet the voices in his head by listening to music". They also described his demeanor as "abnormal".

In December 2011, another of Aron's attorneys, Howard Greenberg, sparked outrage when he remarked of his client, "Look, everybody knows when blood relations have offspring, there can be genetic defects ... There's inbreeding in that community" – the latter referring to the Hasidic Jewish community of New York City.

=== Autopsy findings ===
On July 20, 2011, the office of the New York City medical examiner released autopsy results revealing that Kletzky had ingested a lethal mix of four different drugs and had then been smothered. The cause of death was determined to be intoxication from a combination of cyclobenzaprine (a muscle relaxant), quetiapine (an antipsychotic), and hydrocodone and acetaminophen (two analgesics), followed by smothering. Upon release of the autopsy results, the case was officially ruled a homicide.

On August 9, 2011, the New York City medical examiner's office revealed that Kletzky had ingested a fifth drug, Duloxetine, which is used for generalized anxiety disorder and as an antidepressant. The blood tests revealing this drug took a few weeks to process at an outside lab.

=== Indictment ===
Hours after the autopsy results were released on July 20, a Brooklyn grand jury indicted Aron on eight counts of murder and kidnapping – including two counts of first-degree murder, three counts of second-degree murder, two counts of first-degree kidnapping, and one count of second-degree kidnapping – which carries a maximum sentence of life in prison without parole.

A day after the indictment was handed down, one of Aron's lawyers, Gerard Marrone, resigned from the case, saying that he could not represent the defendant as "the allegations were too horrific". Attorney Jennifer McCann joined Pierre Bazile for the defense. The case was prosecuted by the Kings County (Brooklyn) District Attorney's Office. The lead prosecutor was veteran Assistant District Attorney Julie B. Rendelman of the Homicide Bureau. Rendelman was the attorney who successfully prosecuted Horace Moore for the stabbing murder of NYC bus driver Edwin Thomas. Also assigned to the case was Assistant District Attorney Linda Weinman.

=== Arraignment ===
Aron was declared competent to stand trial in an arraignment at the New York State Supreme Court in Brooklyn on August 4, 2011.

Results of the psychiatric evaluation, obtained by the Associated Press, indicate that Aron was diagnosed with an adjustment disorder. The suspect was said to be "confused and apathetic", with a "'practically blank' personality". In addition, the psychologist apperceived him as reserved, apathetic, sad and cooperative, and diagnosed a schizoid personality disorder. Details also emerged that Aron had a younger sister who died while institutionalized for schizophrenia.

Aron was held at Rikers Island on round-the-clock suicide watch. He gave his first media interview to the New York Post on August 12, 2011. He did not refer to Kletzky by name, and kept referring to the smothering and dismembering of the boy as "the incident". He did not explain why he took and kept the boy, saying, "He looked familiar. I thought I knew him".

On August 23, 2011, the State Supreme Court justice assigned to the case, Justice Neil J. Firetog, chided Aron's lawyers in court for discussing the case on their Facebook pages, accused them of leaking the court-ordered psychological examination to the press, and questioned their ability to handle such a complex case given their lack of experience. Pierre Bazile, who passed the bar in 2007, had defended only one homicide case, while Jennifer McCann had defended six cases, three of them ending in acquittal. A veteran criminal defense lawyer, Howard Greenberg, subsequently joined the defense team pro bono to offset the judge's criticism of lack of experience.

=== Pre-trial hearing ===
On October 24, 2011, Aron appeared at a brief hearing in the State Supreme Court via video conferencing. Outside the courtroom, his lawyers claimed that police forced Aron to write his 450-word confession, stating that he was not sane enough to be aware of his actions. They also told reporters that they were pursuing an insanity defense.

=== Denial of change of venue ===
In November 2011, the Appellate Division of the State Supreme Court denied Aron's counsel's request to move the trial to Suffolk County or the Bronx in light of unfavorable media coverage in Brooklyn. Although he reported hearing voices in his head, Aron was declared fit to stand trial. In March 2012, Aron appeared in court via video conferencing while his attorneys scheduled a new trial date. In May of that year, he appeared before the court again via video conferencing.

=== Plea bargain agreement ===
On August 1, 2012, it was reported that prosecutors had struck a deal with the defense in which Aron would plead guilty in exchange for a sentence of at least 40 years to life in prison. The Kletzky family supported this decision, wanting to avoid reliving the murder if the case went to trial. On August 9, 2012, Aron changed his plea to guilty of one charge of second-degree murder and one charge of second-degree kidnapping at Brooklyn Supreme Court. He answered a series of questions from the judge in which he admitted to killing Leiby Kletzky. On August 29, 2012, Judge Neil Firetog sentenced Aron to 25 years to life on the second-degree murder charge and 15 years to life on the second-degree kidnapping charge. According to the Department of Corrections and Community Supervision's inmate lookup website, he was eligible for parole on May 18, 2049.

=== Civil lawsuits ===
On August 17, 2011, Nachman Kletzky filed a $100 million civil lawsuit against Aron in Brooklyn Supreme Court, seeking damages for the "abduction, kidnapping, torture, murder and dismemberment" of his son. On August 23, Kletzky filed a $100 million civil suit against Aron's father, Jack, for neglecting to monitor his son or protect Leiby while the latter was in his home.

== Proposed legislation ==
In the wake of the murder, State Assemblymen Dov Hikind and Peter Abbate, along with State Senator Diane Savino, said they would introduce a bill called "Leiby's Initiative", which would grant a $500 annual tax credit to any New York City property owner who installs and maintains surveillance cameras on their property.

New York City Councilman David Greenfield has said he would propose "Leiby's Law", a bill under which businesses could volunteer to be designated as safe places for children who are lost or otherwise in trouble. Employees would undergo background checks and business owners would put a green sticker in their store windows so children know it is a safe place to get help. On August 16, 2011, the Brooklyn District Attorney's office announced a similar program called "Safe Stop". So far, 76 stores have signed up to display a green "Safe Haven" sticker in their windows to help lost children.

In September 2013, Hikind and State Senate Majority Leader Dean Skelos announced the implementation of the Leiby Kletzky Security Initiative, which will provide the installation of 100 security cameras on public lampposts throughout the Midwood and Borough Park neighborhoods. Paid for by a $1 million state grant, the cameras will be maintained by Secure Watch 24, a private security firm and LLC controlled by Agudath Israel of America. Recorded data from the cameras will be retained for up to five years. According to Agudath Israel of America, camera footage will be accessed only by the NYPD.

== Memorials and legacy ==
On July 20, 2011, relatives of Kletzky launched a website for the newly established Leiby Kletzky Memorial Fund, which aims to raise $1 million to help children and families in crisis and need. In its first day of operation, the website garnered $61,581 from 1,365 donors.

In early August of that year, Hasidic singer Lipa Schmeltzer released a ballad called "Leiby Forever" and a seven-minute music video showing home movies of Kletzky growing up. After the beginning of the video, a CCTV footage of the abduction plays.

== Aftermath ==
In June 2017, Aron's brother, Tzvi, was found dead in the same house where parts of Kletzky's body had been discovered. Tzvi's body was found bound, wrapped in a blanket, and stuffed into a closet in the basement apartment where Tzvi was living. Autopsy results were inconclusive as to the cause of death.

Levi Aron died at Wende Correctional Facility in Erie County, New York, on December 3, 2025, at the age of 49.

== See also ==
- List of kidnappings
- List of murdered American children
- List of solved missing person cases (post-2000)
- Murder of Vicki Lynne Hoskinson
