= Shomrim (neighborhood watch group) =

Orthodox Jewish civilian volunteer patrols

Shomrim (Hebrew: שׁוֹמְרִים, 'watchers', 'guards') or Shmira (שְׁמִירָה, 'protection') are organizations of proactive volunteer Jewish civilian patrols which have been set up in Haredi communities in neighborhoods across the United States, Canada, the United Kingdom, Israel, Belgium, and Australia (among other countries) to combat burglary, vandalism, mugging, assault, domestic violence, nuisance crimes and antisemitic attacks, and to help and support victims of crime. They also help locate missing people.

Shmira and Shomrim volunteers are generally unarmed and do not have the authority to make arrests, other than citizen's arrest.

In Brooklyn, Baltimore, and London, many residents call Shmira or Shomrim prior to the police due to the former's shorter response time. However, Shomrim in New York has been criticised by the New York City Police Department (NYPD) for not always notifying police when a call comes in. In London, however, the Hackney Police Borough Commander Chief Superintendent Matthew Horne complimented Shomrim on this point, saying that "they will generally know when is the time to call us. They don't tend to waste our time and they don't let people go".

== History ==
The forerunner of the Shomrim was the Maccabees, a Jewish patrol organization founded by Samuel Schrage in 1964 in the Crown Heights neighborhood of Brooklyn. While initially successful, it was disbanded at the end of the decade due to political pressure amid allegations of lack of oversight and tense relations with the African American community.

The Shomrim patrol groups were first established in the Brooklyn neighborhoods of Borough Park, Crown Heights, Flatbush, and Williamsburg in the late 1970s and early 1980s. Similar patrols were later established in Haredi neighborhoods in Monsey, New York; Baltimore, Maryland; Miami, Florida; Waterbury, Connecticut; and London, United Kingdom.

== Volunteers ==
Shomrim unpaid volunteers are mostly members of the Haredi Jewish communities that they serve. Despite previous reports, London Shomrim does not require that its members must be Jewish, male, employed or married, according to Stamford Hill Shomrim volunteer Michael Scher. In Brooklyn, Shomrim members, according to their coordinator, are fingerprinted and checked for a criminal record before being allowed to join the patrol. In Stamford Hill, London, Shomrim volunteers undergo training according to Security Industry Authority standards and are DBS-checked prior to joining as a volunteer.

Shomrim volunteers – who range from a few dozen to over 100, depending on the group – work on foot or in cars. Generally, members work two to a vehicle that is equipped with a radio and a siren. However, the UK divisions of Shomrim do not have audible or visual warning equipment (blues-and-twos) fitted in their vehicles. Some Brooklyn patrols have marked cars which resemble New York City Police Department (NYPD) vehicles, but most use their own, unmarked cars. The patrols carry walkie-talkies, and wear identifying jackets and yarmulkes on the job.

The volunteers, says a coordinator, do not carry guns, batons, pepper spray, or handcuffs, and do not have the authority to make arrests. However, they are trained in how to safely track and detain suspects until police arrive, otherwise known as citizen's arrest. They have been known to quickly mobilize area residents to block off streets in order to stop suspects.

== Operations ==
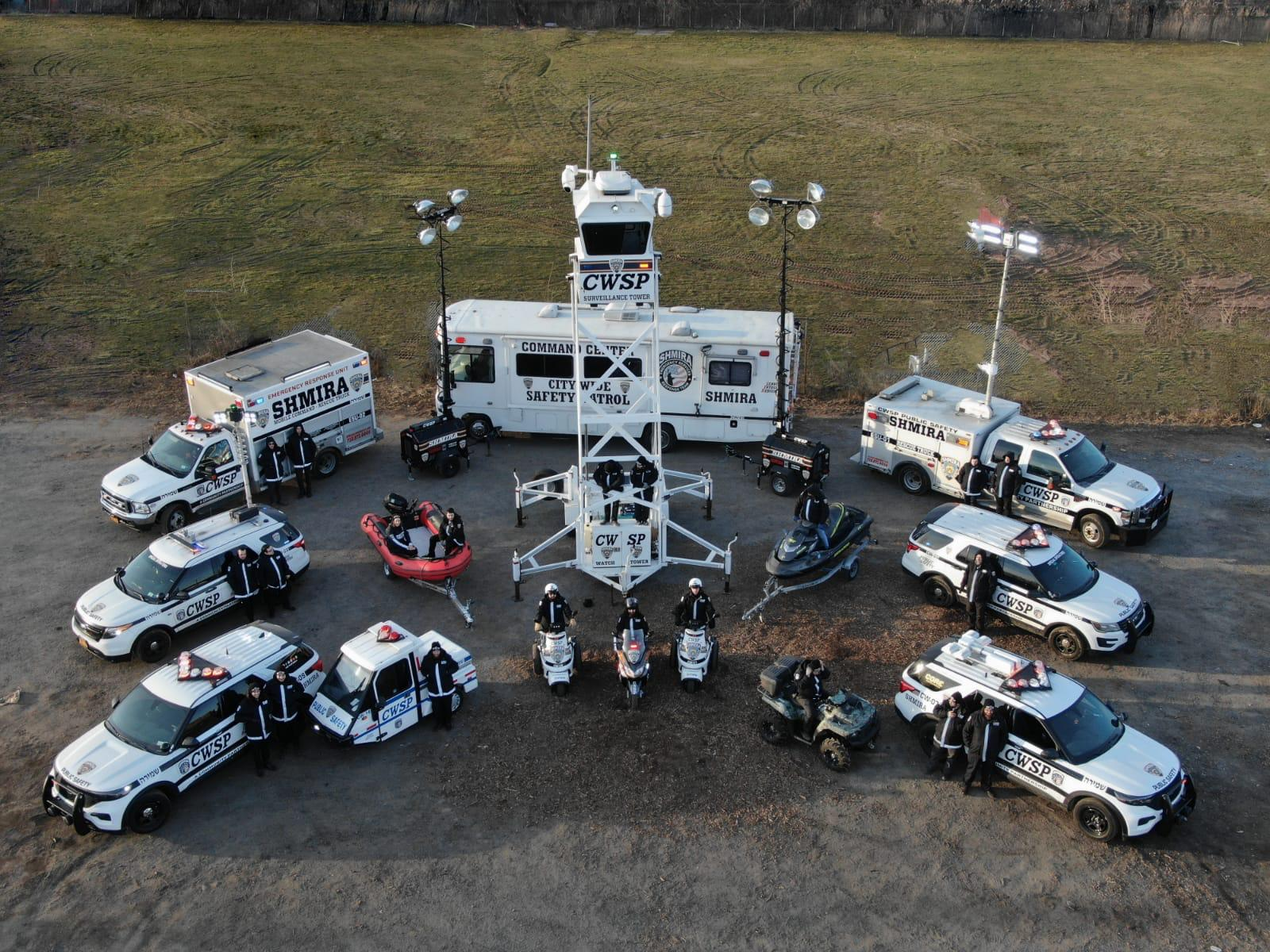
Various vehicles and equipment used by Shmira Public Safety

Each group maintains its own dispatchers and 24-hour hotlines, whose numbers are known throughout the Orthodox Jewish community.

Volunteers respond to a wide variety of crimes and cases, including reports of purse snatching, vandalism, car and bicycle thefts, and missing people. Volunteers patrol the city streets in the overnight hours as a deterrent presence. When they are not on duty, they remain on call, and are often summoned to help other patrol groups or other Jewish community rescue organizations such as Hatzalah, Chaverim and Chavivim during large-scale search and rescue operations.

Shmira and Shomrim have been effective in apprehending suspects of burglaries robberies, assault, car thefts, vandalism, domestic violence, nuisance crimes, and antisemitic attacks. In an incident in 2010, four Brooklyn South Shomrim (BSSP) volunteers suffered gunshot wounds after an incident involving a suspicious man. The Shomrim reported seeing the man leering at young girls the previous week. The four Shomrim volunteers tackled the man, beginning a physical altercation. The man and all four Shomrim received bullet wounds. The man was later acquitted of all charges except possessing a gun. Following that incident, BSSP members were issued bullet-proof vests by the New York State Senate.

Shomrim volunteers have occasionally been criticized for using excessive force with suspects, particularly non-Jews. In 1996 a Crown Heights Shomrim volunteer was convicted of assault charges after repeatedly hitting a suspect on the head with a walkie-talkie after the man had been subdued. In 2010, a Baltimore Shomrim volunteer, an ex-Israeli Special Forces soldier, was arrested for striking a black 15-year-old. The boy had been walking along a road in the early afternoon when a van with males started to drive next to him. The boy, who the judge said was frightened, took a nail-studded board from a construction site. The volunteer hit him with a walkie-talkie and, with help from two others, held the boy on the ground for 8 to 10 minutes. The volunteer was suspended pending internal investigation, with Shomrim confident that he would be vindicated in court. He was sentenced to three years of probation in 2012, and ordered to research and write essays on cultural diversity. In 2011, two Monsey Shomrim volunteers were charged with misdemeanors in a fracas that erupted after a girl hit a passing van with a water balloon.

Many Shmira and Shomrim organisations call together an annual Community Engagement Event, with advice on crime prevention and bike registration. The latter process has been instrumental in reuniting stolen bicycles with their owners through registration numbers which are etched into the bicycle frame.

== Police relations and controversy ==
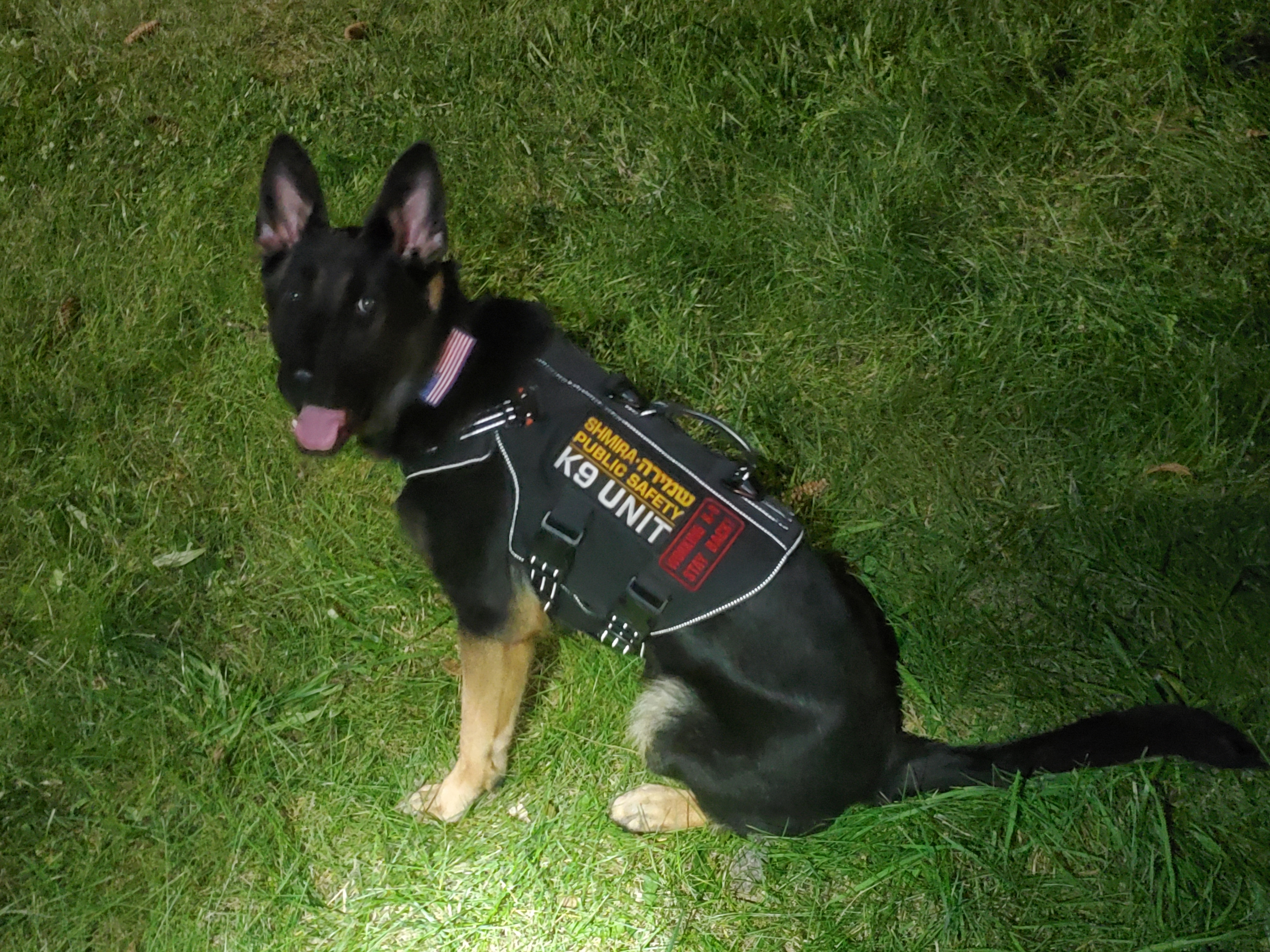
A Shmira K9 German Shepherd used for rescue and recovery operations

Shomrim and Shmira maintain a strong working relationship with local police departments and regularly share their information on crime with officers.

The relationship is a sensitive one, however. Many residents of Hasidic neighborhoods in Brooklyn, Baltimore, and Stamford Hill tend to call Shmira or Shomrim in an emergency rather than the police. The groups cite their faster response times, knowledge of their territories, and ability to speak Yiddish, the language of the Hasidic community, for the residents' preference.

While the expectation is for Shomrim to notify police, this is done in some cases but not in others. Former New York City Police Commissioner Raymond Kelly has publicly stated that Shomrim does not immediately notify police when a call comes in. This was highlighted in the 2011 missing-child case of Leiby Kletzky. The first call by Kletzky's mother reporting her missing child was received by BSSP more than two hours before Kletzky's father called the police;. BSSP explains that it does not always notify police immediately in cases of missing children, since it receives at least 10 such calls a day and is experienced in quickly locating children by searching candy stores, buses, and relatives' homes. In London, however, the Hackney Police Borough Commander Chief Superintendent Matthew Horne complimented Shomrim on this point, saying that "they will generally know when is the time to call us. They don't tend to waste our time and they don't let people go".

In Brooklyn, Shomrim has been accused of withholding information about suspected local child molesters. One BSSP member acknowledged to the press that they maintain a file of suspected local child molesters, and some believe that this file includes the suspects' photos and the make, model and license-plate number of their cars. But Shomrim does not share this information with police due to the Torah prohibition against mesirah (informing on a fellow Jew to the non-Jewish authorities). However, another high-ranking member claims that the other member was misquoted, and that the list that BSSP maintains is culled from the New York Sex Offender Registry. Members of the Williamsburg Shomrim always consult a rabbi before involving police in a crime committed by one Jew against another. Although Shomrim and Shmira have on many occasions received awards and commendations from the police for their work, some Shomrim members in the United States have been accused of assaults and misdemeanors against people from outside their community.

The founding of Shomrim organizations in North West London and Stamford Hill in 2008 initially met with disapproval by the Metropolitan Police, which questioned the existence of a community patrol working in tandem with trained police officers and claimed they were endangering themselves. In 2009, a new borough commander in Hackney Chief Superintendent Steve Bending consulted with the NYPD to draw up a list of expectations for the volunteer patrol. The Stamford Hill Shomrim and the North West London Shomrim agreed to have its members undergo background checks and sign a code of conduct, and pledged to implement disciplinary measures for members who "act inappropriately". Today the Hackney borough commander commends Shomrim in its role as "evidence-gathers" and support for police activities. They have received public praise from the higher ranks, including a formal commendation award from the local Metropolitan Police Borough Commander.

Stamford Hill Shomrim members receive ongoing training from the Police at Stoke Newington Police Station, and are kept updated about new, targeted police operations in the area.

== Funding ==
Shomrim and Shmira organizations receive voluntary donations mostly from members of the Orthodox Jewish community they serve.

Both Shmira and Shomrim groups have been successful at securing taxpayer funding in member earmarks for their operations, allowing them to buy sophisticated equipment. Commentators cite the groups' effectiveness and also their political clout as a voting bloc that follows rabbis' direction.

== List of Shmira and Shomrim organizations ==
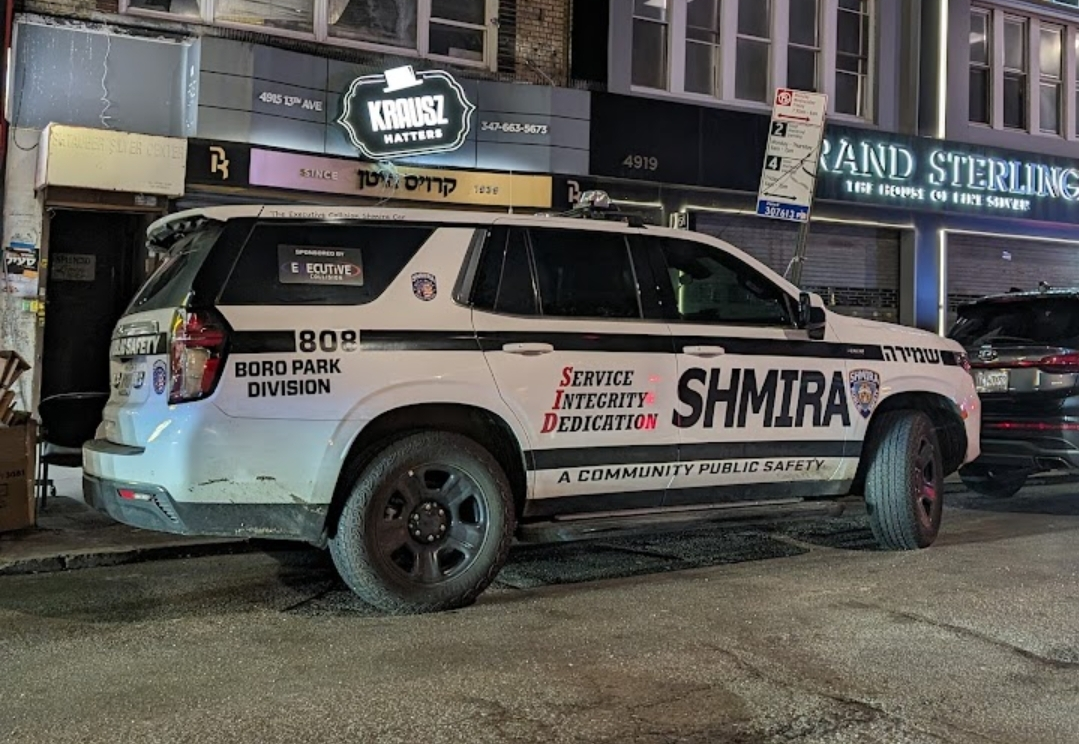
A Boro Park Shmira Chevrolet Tahoe

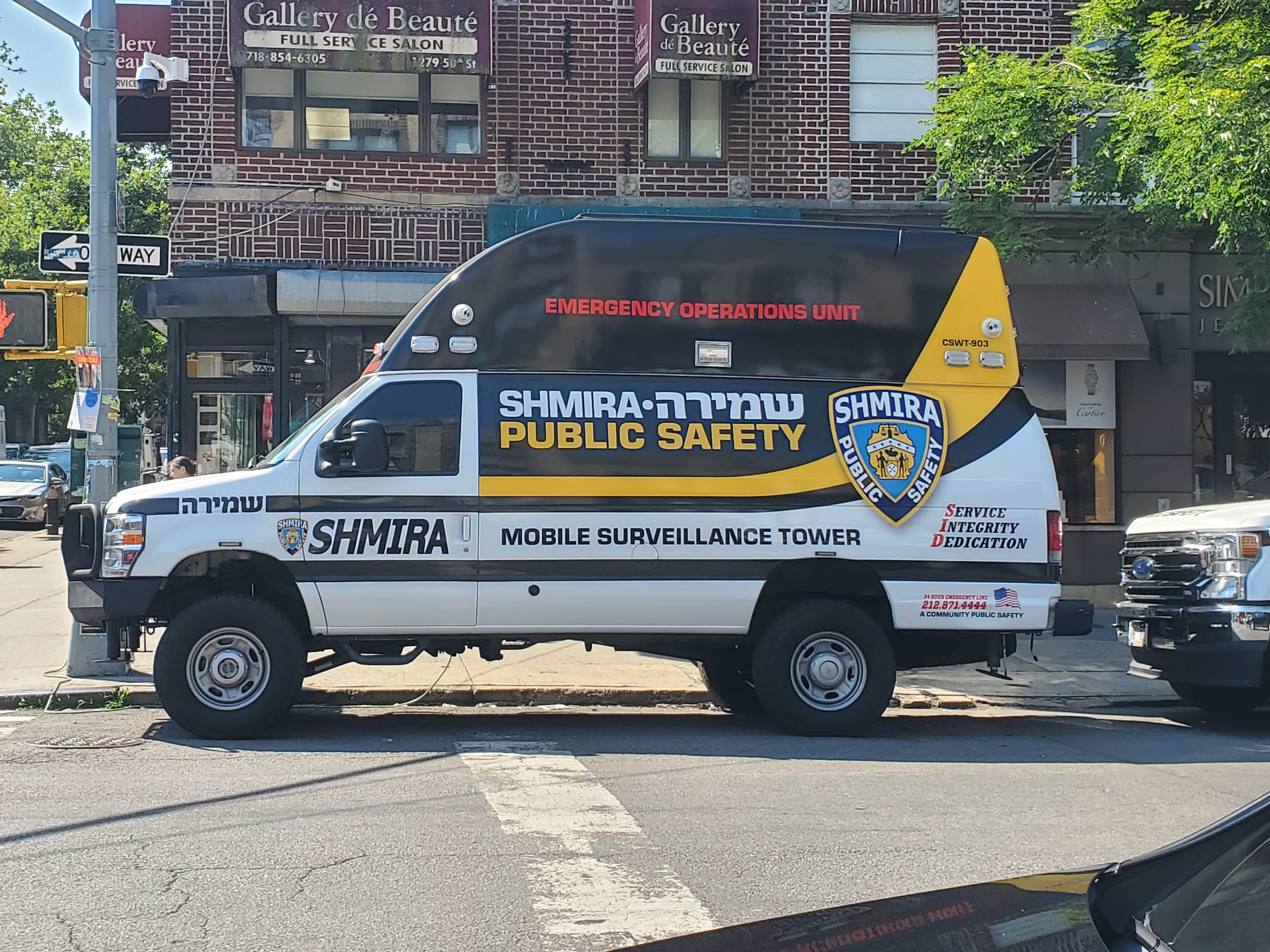
A Shmira Public Safety mobile surveillance tower vehicle parked near their headquarters in Borough Park

=== New York City ===
==== Boro Park Shmira Public Safety ====
Boro Park Shmira patrols Borough Park and surrounding areas including Kensington, Bay Ridge, and Bensonhurst. It was founded in 2010 by Levi Leifer and has over 200 members who respond to emergency calls including robberies, shoplifting, assaults, vehicle theft, vandalism, missing persons, burglaries, and sex crimes among others.

Shmira maintains an elaborate surveillance and investigation division where trainedvolunteers perform duties such as tracking suspects, investigating crimes, and assisting local detectives in solving crimes.

In 2022, Shmira was in the headlines after volunteers successfully caught and disbanded multiple catalytic converter theft rings operating in and around the area, gaining praise from both the police and residents alike.

==== Brooklyn South Shomrim ====
The Shomrim-run Brooklyn South Safety Patrol (BSSP), which covers the neighborhoods of Boro Park, Bensonhurst, and Kensington, has its origins in the 1980s when it was founded by Jacob Daskal. In the beginning the group was known as the "Bakery Boys" as its members were bakers who observed late-night car break-ins in progress. Its command center is located in a tire shop. The dispatchers, owners of the tire shop, receive about 20 calls a day and direct a force of 150 members.

A BSSP Shomrim patrol emblem/shoulder patch c. 1990s to present

BSSP came to international attention as the coordinator of a massive volunteer search for Leiby Kletzky, an 8-year-old Boro Park boy who went missing while walking home from day camp in July 2011; he was later found murdered by a Kensington resident. The Brooklyn South command center alerted other Shomrim patrols in Flatbush, Williamsburg, and Crown Heights, as well as Haredi communities in Monsey, Monroe, Lawrence, Passaic, and Lakewood, to mobilize up to 5,000 Orthodox Jewish volunteers for a block-by-block search for the missing boy. After police identified the suspect's car from surveillance videos, two Flatbush volunteers searching in nearby Kensington spotted the car; the suspect was apprehended by police shortly after. Later the BSSP maintained order at the huge funeral for the victim and outside the parents' home during the week-long shiva period.

In April 2016, Alex Lichtenstein, a former BSSP leader who was Boro Park's liaison to the NYPD, was charged with bribing police officers to obtain 150 gun permits for $6,000 a piece, then selling them to community members for $18,000. Upon his sentencing on 16 March 2017 to 32 months imprisonment and a $20,000 fine, Judge Sidney H. Stein said, "Mr. Lichtenstein has led a life of great deeds. He has also committed a great crime. You participated in corrupting the New York City police department".

On 10 May 2018, Daskal was arrested by the NYPD on suspicion of statutory rape of a 16-year-old girl. He was charged the next day with third-degree rape, a criminal sex act, sexual abuse, forcible touching, and acting in a manner injurious to a child less than 17. The revelation was followed by Daskal's immediate resignation from his post as campaign treasurer for Simcha Eichenstein, a New York State Assembly candidate from the neighborhood. Authorities believe the abuse took place at Daskal's home in Boro Park between August and November 2017.

==== Crown Heights Shmira Public Safety ====
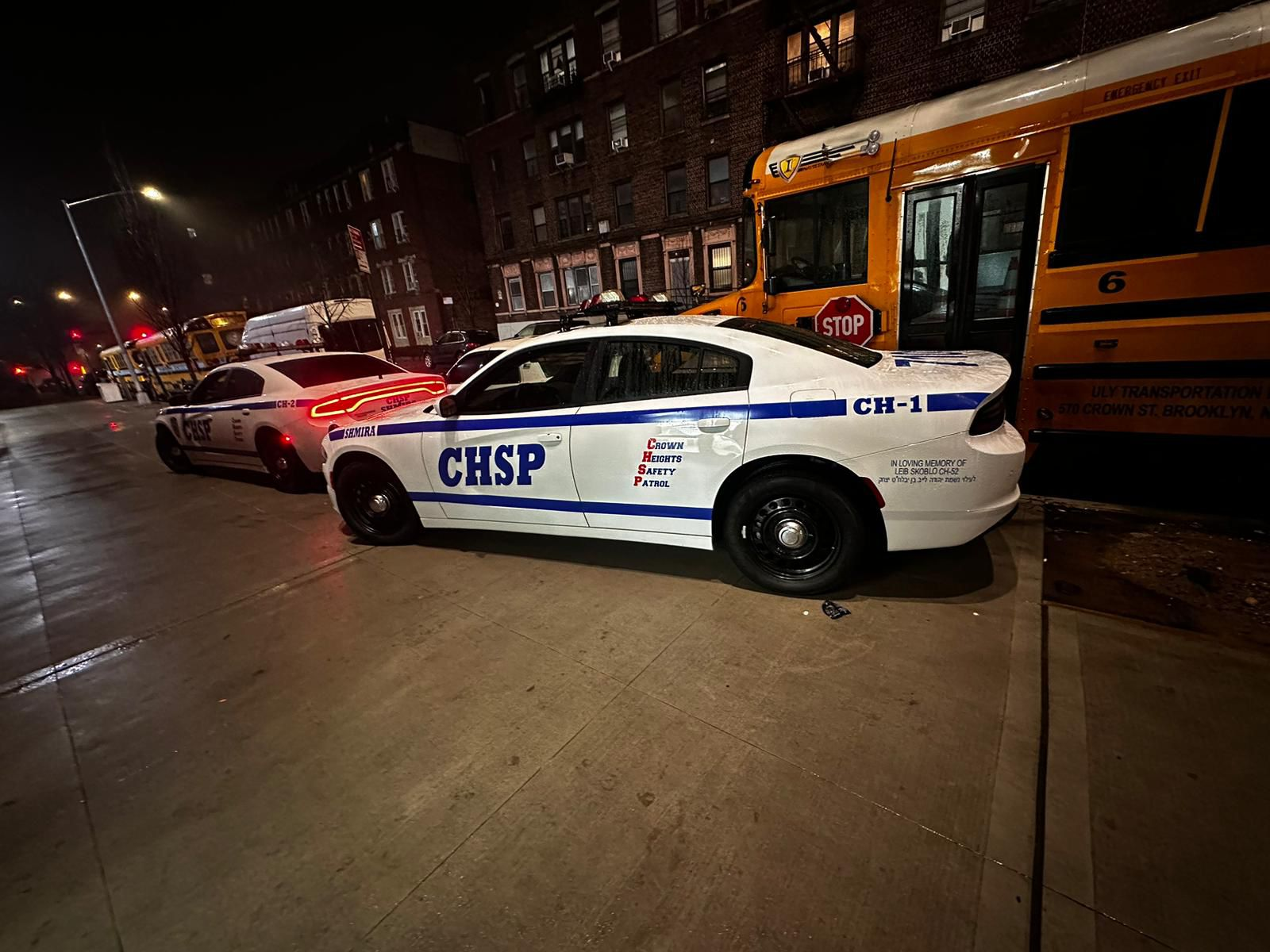
Crown Heights Shmira Dodge Charger patrol vehicles

Crown Heights Shmira patrols Crown Heights and the surrounding areas, and maintains a fleet of marked vehicles ready for emergencies 24 hours a day. Their mission is to keep their communities safe by means of visible patrols in order to deter crime and maintain quality of life.

==== Crown Heights Shomrim ====
Crown Heights Shomrim was founded in the 1970s. It expanded its operations following the 1991 Crown Heights riots. Members respond to armed robberies, burglaries, assaults in progress, missing persons cases, automobile accidents and general assistance to residents. Part of their training includes advanced de-escalation techniques, krav maga and communications efficiency. In Addition, their members operate and maintain a fleet of emergency response vehicles. While volunteers wear uniforms with a shoulder patch, they are not authorized to make arrests, they will chase suspects and try to detain them by surrounding them and talking to them until police arrive.

==== Flatbush Shomrim ====
The Flatbush Shomrim Safety Patrol, originally known as Brooklyn Midwood Shomrim, was founded in 1991 by Chaim Deutsch with the support of neighborhood rabbinic leaders. At the time, police did not have the manpower to respond immediately to crimes in progress. The group's 40 volunteers patrol in their own, unmarked cars and use high-powered binoculars to view suspects at a distance. If they see a crime in progress, they summon police, who respond promptly. Often, the Shomrim volunteers serve as witnesses for the filing of police reports. Members also carry special equipment for opening locked houses and cars. In 2009, the Flatbush Shomrim acquired a $250,000 mobile security command center which is similar to NYPD command centers, including a state-of-the-art communications system, flat-panel television, computer, fax machine, portable defibrillator, a toilet incinerator that can convert solid waste to ash, conference room, and kitchen.

==== Manhattan Shomrim Safety Patrol ====
Manhattan Shomrim is a community safety patrol in Manhattan. It officially opened in July 2025 with a ribbon-cutting ceremony attended by Alvin Kass, a rabbi serving as Chief Chaplain of the NYPD.

==== Queens Shmira Public Safety ====
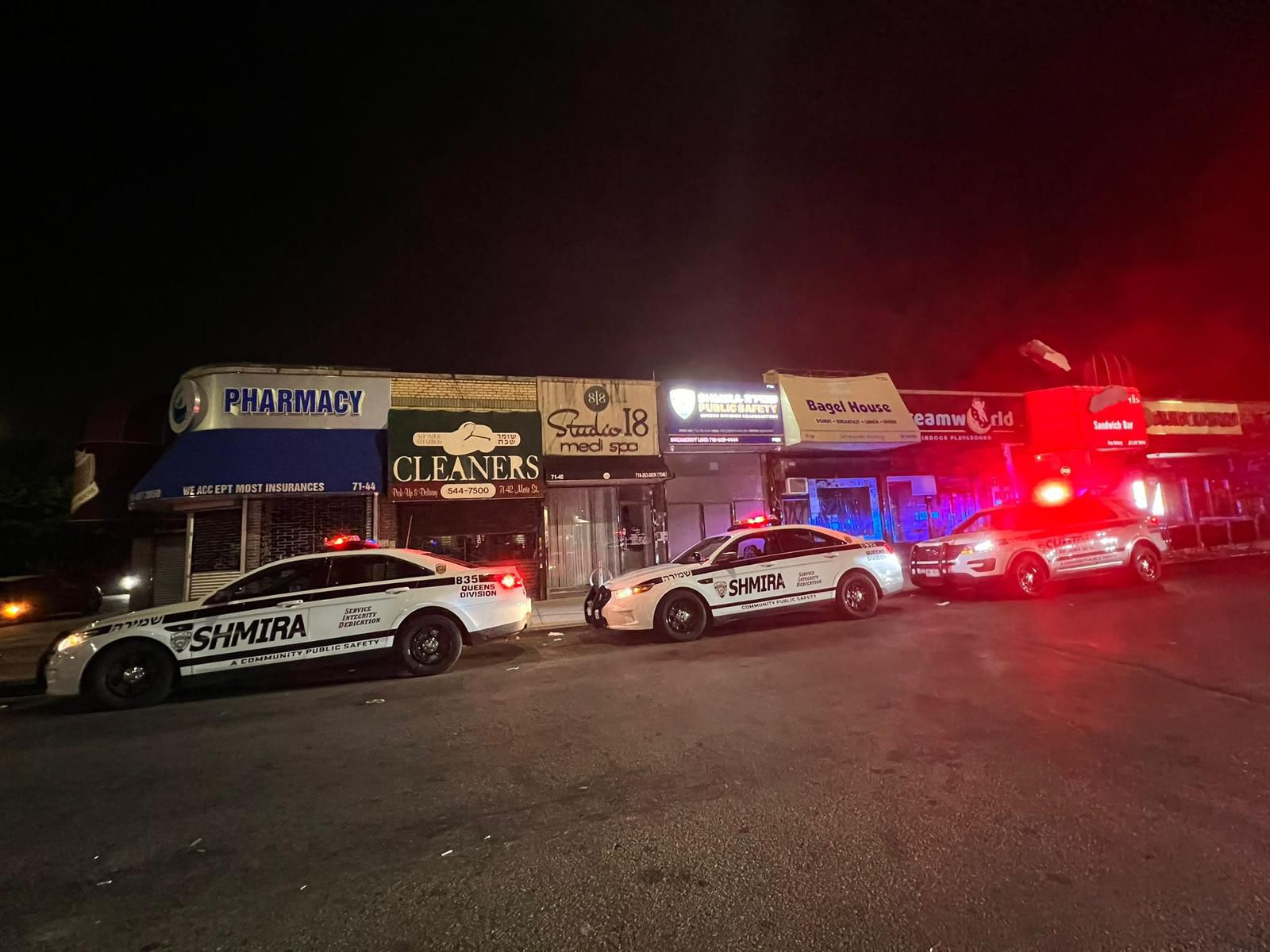
Queens Shmira Public Safety vehicles

Queens Shmira patrols the entirety of Queens, New York, including Forest Hills, Fresh Meadows, Kew Gardens, Jamaica Estates, and Rego Park among others, responding to various calls for help, including assaults, hate crimes and more.

==== Queens Shomrim ====
The Queens Shomrim branch was inaugurated in February 2025 under its coordinator Sruli Weiss. They operate in coordination with other Shomrim branches and with Chaverim.

==== Williamsburg Shomrim ====
The Williamsburg Shomrim was founded in 1977 by a local resident, in response to a wave of violent muggings perpetuated on Jewish residents by non-Jews. Today, the majority of calls received by Williamsburg Shomrim deal with car theft, missing children, and graffiti. In 2011, most of its 50 members worked six nights a week. As of 2019, it has over 100 members.

In 2013, a Shomrim patrol attacked a student in south Williamsburg. The victim, who remains blind in his left eye, stated that while beating him, the men yelled homophobic slurs. Five suspects were arrested; one was convicted of gang assault and other charges all of which were later overturned on appeal, two pled guilty to lesser offenses and were sentenced to probation and community service in "culturally diverse neighborhoods", and two had the charges dismissed as the witnesses recanted their identification. The patrol had claimed to be responding to reports of car vandalism, but this was deemed "unfounded."

===== Staten Island Shmira =====
Staten Island Shmira patrols the neighborhoods of Willowbrook, Manor Heights, Westerleigh, New Springville and Todt Hill among others responding to various situations and emergencies, providing security and keeping order at large community events, and maintaining a visual presence in order to deter crime.

=== Eastern United States ===
==== Baltimore Shomrim ====
Baltimore Shomrim was founded in 2005 in response to a rash of burglaries in the city's Orthodox Jewish community. In its first five years, the organization received over 4,600 calls for assistance. Members – generally local Orthodox businessmen and shopkeepers – wear matching jackets and carry two-way radios. The organization divides the area under surveillance into quadrants and responds quickly to all calls. Among the calls for help are bicycle thefts, missing children, and suicide attempts.

==== Catskills Shmira Public Safety ====
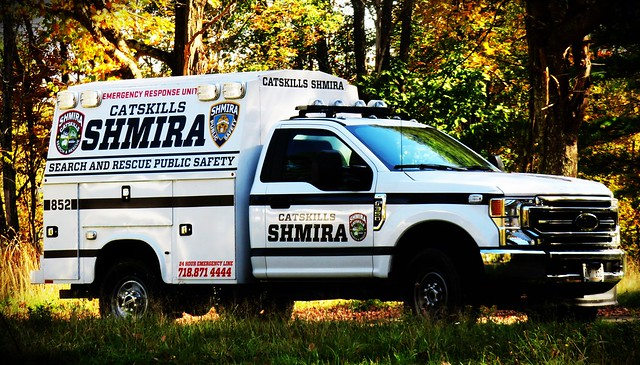
Catskills Shmira vehicle in Sullivan County, New York

The Catskills Shmira Patrol operates in the Catskill Mountains region of New York State, a popular destination for Orthodox Jewish families during the summer months. Their duties include providing a visible presence, patrolling hundreds of neighborhoods, responding to incidents, search and rescue, event coordination, and liaising with local law enforcement when necessary to enhance the safety and security of their communities, serving both a practical security function and a communal support role.

==== Lakewood Civilian Safety Watch ====
The Lakewood Civilian Safety Watch, commonly known as the Lakewood Shomrim, was formed in 2006 by Chaim Rubin and Aaron Kugielsky after an incident in which a local cheder teacher walking home one evening was attacked by an assailant with a steel bat. As of 2015, the group has more than 60 Jewish volunteers, as well as non-Jewish personnel who work on Shabbat and Jewish holidays. The organization patrols the streets of Lakewood Township, New Jersey in marked cars. It fields an average of 400 calls a month. It also conducts public awareness campaigns for summer safety, school bus safety, and driving safety, and bicycle registration drives.

==== Miami-Dade Shmira Patrol ====
Miami-Dade Shmira Patrol was founded in 2003 as North Miami Beach Shmira Patrol by Isaac (Yitzy) Rosenberg. They patrol and keep the peace in Jewish communities in and around Miami.

=== Western United States ===
==== Magen Chicago Shomrim ====
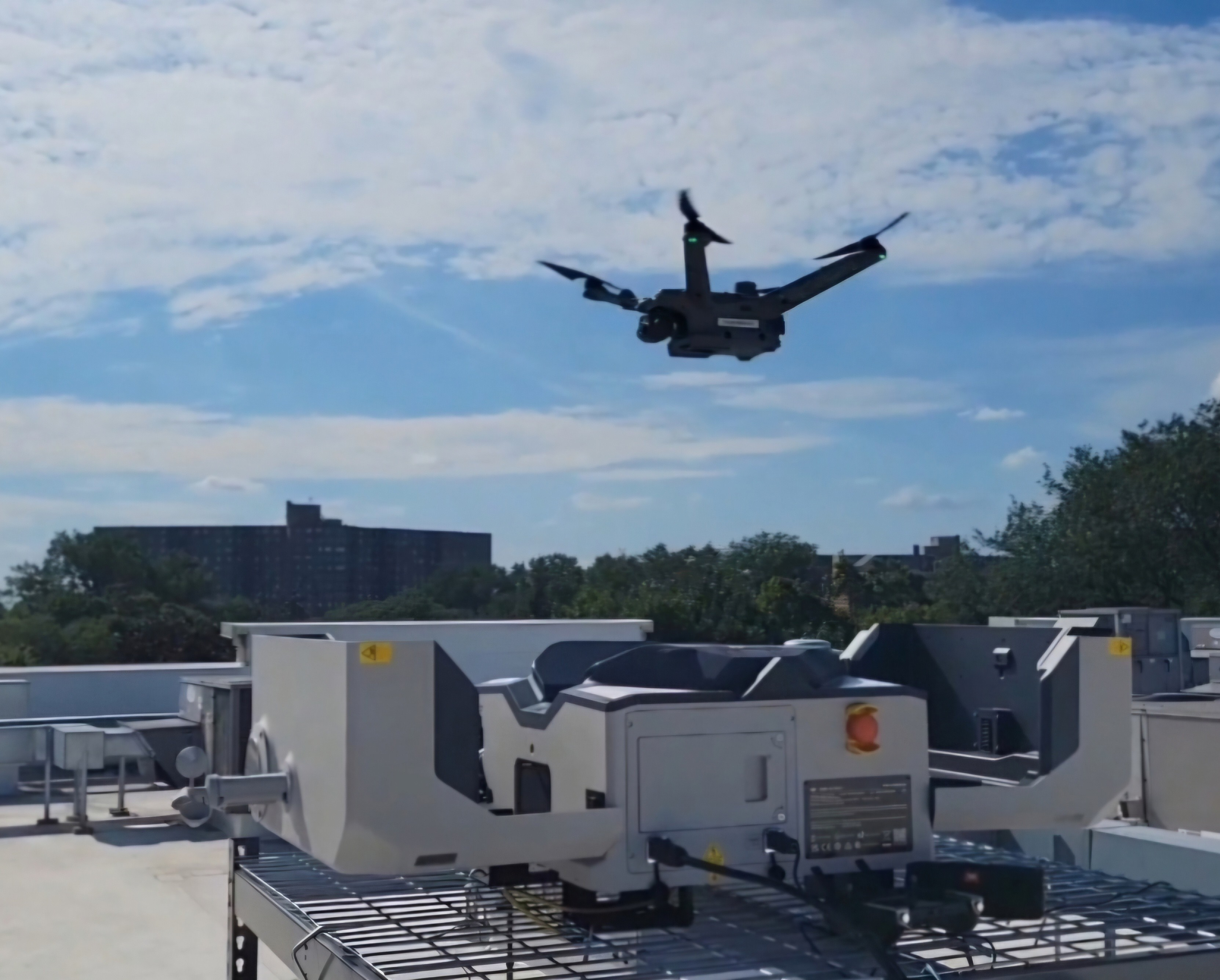
A drone docking station at MAGEN Chicago Shomrim

MAGEN Chicago Shomrim is a 501(c)(3) non-profit community safety organization based in Skokie, Illinois. Serving the Jewish community in the Chicago metropolitan area, the organization was founded in 2016 by Chiam Naiditch as CCL Shul Members. It began as an effort to empower the community to protect their homes, synagogues, and neighborhoods, and now works closely with local law enforcement agencies. The organization operates the Shul Alert Channel, which is tied into most local synagogues, enabling direct communication and coordinated response. The SkyWatch drone program provides aerial overwatch at community events, monitored from its specialized drone van. The organization operates several fixed drone docks strategically positioned throughout their service area, which can be remotely deployed from a computer.

==== Los Angeles Shmira ====
The Los Angeles Shmira Safety Patrol was founded in 2009 in the Pico/Robertson area of Los Angeles. After a slow start, a former member of the Guardian Angels joined and helped revitalize the patrol. LA Shmira works closely with the Los Angeles Police Department's Olympic Division and coordinates with the South Robertson District Council's Safety Committee. LA Shmira currently has 4 dispatchers and 20 volunteer responders, including three Rabbis.

=== United Kingdom ===
==== Shomrim London NW ====
Shomrim London North West Community Patrol operates in the London Borough of Barnet. It was founded by Gary Ost in 2008 as a registered charity which operates as "mobile neighborhood watch" and provides assistance to the local community and the Metropolitan Police. Volunteer Patrol members patrol the streets of Golders Green, Childs Hill, Hendon, Finchley and Temple Fortune whereby members report crime to the Metropolitan Police. At least two vehicles patrol the area every night.

Shomrim London NW operate a 24-hour emergency response team which will dispatch units to a scene of an emergency and will liaise with the other responding emergency services. Volunteers are in radio contact, and dispatched via a central dispatcher.

Shomrim London NW has the capability to deal with various scenarios including the locating of missing persons and protocols are in place for full-scale searches with Stamford Hill Shomrim and North West London Shomrim working in partnership. All volunteers have completed training from the Metropolitan Police Counter Terrorism Command (SO15) in assisting to identify potential security threats and suspicious activity.

The Jewish Rabbinate in London have thanked Shomrim London NW for the dedication of its volunteers and for providing a valuable service in enhancing the quality of life within the Jewish neighborhood. Shomrim London NW also acts as a liaison between the North West London community and the Metropolitan Police.

Ost, chief executive of Shomrim North-West London feels that reporting rates have increased in Barnet due to Shomrim's presence there and their work became doubly important during the London riots in July 2011.

On 4 July 2015, an anti-Shomrim protest organized by neo-Nazis was held at Whitehall. Jeremy Bedford Turner, one of the leading skinheads of the London Forum, was arrested for incitement to racial hatred following an antisemitic speech he made at the rally in which he called upon the protestors to "free England from Jewish control." He was convicted in May 2018 and given a six-month custodial sentence.

==== Shomrim London, Stamford Hill ====
The Stamford Hill Shomrim, founded in 2008 by Efrayim Goldstein, has many volunteers and a 24-hour emergency hotline. Shomrim volunteers undergo training according to Security Industry Authority standards and are CRB-checked prior to joining as a volunteer. Members receive ongoing informal training at Stoke Newington Police Station and are kept updated about new, targeted police operations in the area. In its first five months of operation, the hotline received 2,000 calls reporting burglaries, thefts, muggings, and missing people. Stamford Hill Shomrim receives approximately 4,500 hotline calls a year on average, with incoming calls being dispatched to local Shomrim volunteers via two-way radios. Volunteers also deal with incidents as they come across them on patrol. While police figures previously showed Stamford Hill to have the lowest crime rate in the borough of Hackney, the presence of Shomrim has revealed that crime was being underreported by the largely Yiddish-speaking Hasidic community.

Stamford Hill Shomrim proactively patrol and operate primarily – but not exclusively – in North and East London, typically in the N16 E5 and N15 postcodes. This encompasses the area generally referred to as Stamford Hill, Upper Clapton and South Tottenham, and includes the wards (wholly or partly) of Brownswood, Stoke Newington Central, Stamford Hill West, Woodberry Down (formerly Lordship and New River), Springfield, Cazenove, Leabridge, Hackney Downs, Seven Sisters and St. Ann's, which are located in Hackney and Haringey. On many occasions, especially during searches for High Risk Missing People, Stamford Hill Shomrim members would patrol out of these boundaries.

Stamford Hill Shomrim is currently headed by three Trustees, a Discipline Committee and an Executive Committee elected by its members. Kurt Stern and Isaac Kornbluh who are both members of the Hackney Police Independent Advisory Group, act as liaisons between Shomrim and the police. In 2012, former four-time Mayor of Hackney Joe Lobenstein was appointed as President of Stamford Hill Shomrim. After Lobenstein died on 28 June 2015, aged 88, Herschel Gluck was appointed as the new President of Stamford Hill Shomrim. Shomrim is registered with the Charity Commission and with Neighbourhood Watch as 'Community Safety Patrol'.

In 2013, after the murder of the soldier Lee Rigby, and an increase in hate crimes against the wider Muslim community, Stamford Hill Shomrim offered to help the local Muslim community and keep a watchful eye on local mosques and Muslim community centres. This initiative was gratefully welcomed by the North London Muslim community as stated by Eusoof Amerat, a Muslim community advocate in Hackney, and commended by the Hackney Police Borough Commander. Shomrim also advised the North London Muslim Community Centre on security issues, according to centre chairman Munaf Zeena.

Shomrim's offer to the Muslim community was included in the 2013 annual report on International Religious Freedom and recognised by the US Secretary of State John Kerry in his speech when publishing this report, saying "in London, an Orthodox Jewish neighborhood watch team helped Muslim leaders protect their mosque and prevent future attacks". He continued by saying "they will not receive prizes; they may not ever receive recognition. Their courage goes unremarked, but that makes it all the more remarkable. ... Believe me, that's the definition of courage". In November 2014, Ambassador Samantha Power mentioned Shomrim's offer in her speech at the 10th Anniversary of the OSCE's Berlin Conference on Anti-Semitism.

Stamford Hill Shomrim have on many occasions received public praise from the higher ranks, as on one occasion by Metropolitan Police Superintendent David Grainger after a successful double arrest for burglary. They have been lauded by Deputy Mayor for Policing and Crime Stephen Greenhalgh. In June 2014 Stamford Hill Shomrim received a formal commendation award from the outgoing Hackney Police Borough Commander, Chief Superintendent Matthew Horne. On 12 June 2015, Shomrim volunteers were publicly commended for their help in identifying two suspects who slashed the tyres of many vehicles in the Stamford Hill area. On 5 February 2015, Metropolitan Police Deputy Commissioner Craig Mackey attended a Shomrim event as guest of honour and spoke highly of the work Shomrim do. This event was also attended by the then Minister for Justice Simon Hughes MP.

In August 2014, Stamford Hill Shomrim organised its first annual Community Engagement Event where an estimated six thousand people participated, for advice on crime prevention and bike marking. In July 2015 Shomrim held a similar event where Senior members of Scotland Yard's police force attended including the Deputy Mayor for Policing and Crime Stephen Greenhalgh and Met Police Deputy Assistant Commissioner Helen Ball alongside Hackney borough commander Chief Supt Simon Lawrence. This is now a planned annual event.

As well as helping the community and police with catching offenders and reducing general crime in the area, Shomrim were singled out for their help in bring offenders of antisemitic crime to justice. The Hackney Police Borough Commander was quoted as saying that 27 per cent of antisemitic perpetrators in Hackney are caught and charged or cautioned, and "Shomrim have played a huge part in that by alerting us of crimes and providing evidence to bring offenders to justice".

== In popular culture ==
- In the short-lived television series Brooklyn South, Theodore Bikel guest-starred as Solomon Shuyler, a Shomrim volunteer and organizer.
- In the 2013 film Fading Gigolo, written and directed by John Turturro, Liev Schreiber portrays a volunteer in the Williamsburg Shomrim.
- In Series 3, Episode 3 of No Offence, Daniel Ben Zenou plays the part of a Moss Finestein, a member of the local Shomrim helping with the police investigation into a murder at a Jewish cemetery in Manchester.
- In Season 3, Episode 14 of Blue Bloods, a Shomrim volunteer appears as a background character.

== See also ==
- Civil Guard (Israel)
- Mishmeret Yesha
- Security company
