= Chaverim =

Orthodox Jewish International volunteer organizations

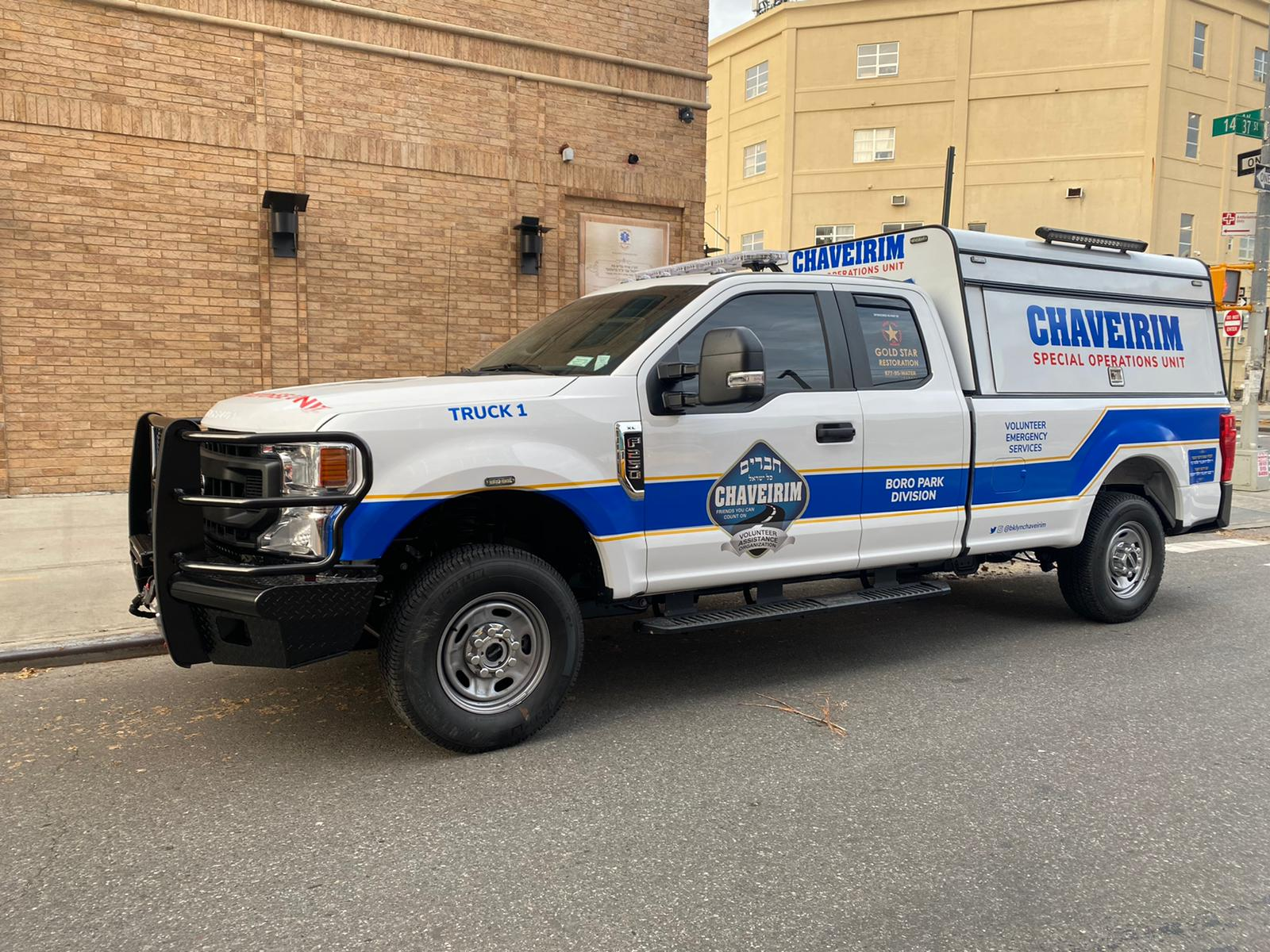
Chaveriem Boro Park Truck Division Special operations truck

Chaverim (Hebrew: חברים, lit. 'companions'), also spelled Chaveirim, is an umbrella name for Orthodox Jewish volunteer organizations with locations all over the world; they provide roadside assistance and other non-medical emergency help at home or on the road. All services are free. The organizations are supported by local donations.

== History ==
Chaverim was started in Monsey, New York by Rabbi Shaya Zev Erps in July 1999. The grassroots organization opened a hotline to assist stranded motorists and elderly and handicapped individuals. Since its founding, the Boro Park Chaverim has logged over 100,000 calls, with hundreds of calls received daily.

== Activities ==
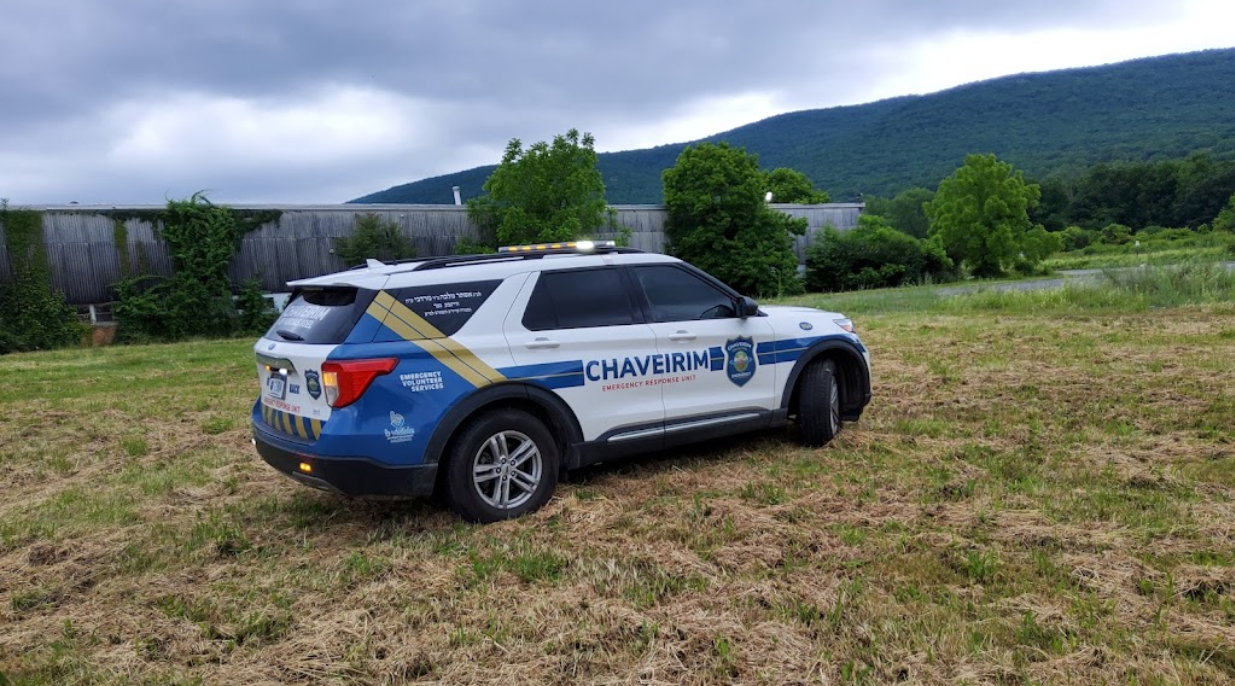
Kiryas Joel Chaveirim Response vehicle

Chaverim volunteers respond to calls at any hour and perform the following duties, including, but not limited to:

- Assist people locked out of their home or vehicle
- Repair flat tires and pump low tires
- Boost car batteries
- Assist cars stuck in snow, mud, etc.
- Give rides to motorists whose cars are disabled
- Transport families to weddings during snowstorms
- Give directions for those in unfamiliar areas
- Obtain gas if someone's gas tank runs dry
- Assist with burst pipes
- Assist with loss of essential services such as gas, electric, water, or telephone
- Provide members for a shiva minyan

=== Car inspections ===
Chaverim of Boro Park provides free 10-minute safety inspections of vehicles prior to the August summer vacation period to draw drivers' attention to safety issues with their cars. Free inspections of tire pressure, blinkers, fluids, spare tire, and other car needs are also offered before the summer vacation by the Lakewood Chaverim.

=== Holiday assistance ===
In 2010 Chaverim of Queens initiated a "Don't Drink and Drive" campaign on Purim which provided drivers to take home inebriated residents.

=== Awards ===
In July 2008 the Lakewood Chaveirim were the recipients of a state resolution presented by New Jersey Senator Robert Singer. In July 2011 the same group was given a special award for community service by the Lakewood Police Department. Police Chief Rob Lawson cited the group's help during a blackout when members volunteered to direct traffic at intersections, as well as their assistance to people locked out of their cars or homes.

== Collaborative efforts ==
Chaverim volunteers often work together with those of the Shomrim, Shmira and Hatzalah organizations to assist residents during crippling weather events, and missing persons searches.

In 2011, Brooklyn City Councilman David Greenfield announced a partnership with Boro Park Chaverim to identify potholes in Flatbush and Midwood after severe winter weather in 2010.

Many Chaverim volunteers are professional tradesmen who donate their professional skills to provide emergency assistance.

== Locations ==
Chaverim organizations are located in:

=== United States ===
==== New York ====
- Brooklyn (including Borough Park, Sea Gate, Williamsburg, Crown Heights and Flatbush)
- Manhattan (including Washington Heights)
- The Catskills
- Staten Island
- Five Towns
- Queens (including Far Rockaway, which is separate)
- Rockland County
- Kiryas Joel
- Tannersville
- Fleischmanns

==== New Jersey ====
- Jersey Shore
- Lakewood
- Passaic
- Bergen County
- Toms River
- Cherry Hill
- Union County
- Middlesex county
- Linden
- Metrowest (West Orange and Livingston)

==== Other ====
- North East Pennsylvania
- Boston
- Baltimore
- Chicago
- Dallas
- Houston
- Waterbury
- Cleveland
- Detroit
- Iowa (primarily in Postville, Iowa)
- Los Angeles
- Phoenix and Scottsdale, Arizona
- Philadelphia
- South Florida
- Greater Washington, DC (primarily in Silver Spring)

=== Other countries ===
==== Australia ====
- Melbourne

==== Belgium ====
- Antwerp

==== Canada ====
- Montreal
- Toronto

==== Israel ====
- Jerusalem

==== United Kingdom ====
- London (Stamford Hill, NW London)
- Manchester

==== Argentina ====
- Buenos Aires

== Similar organizations ==
Yedidim is an independent offshoot of New York's Chaverim operating in Israel since 2006 with 65,000 volunteers. Yedidim responds to calls to jumpstart cars, change flat tires, fix home plumbing and electrical problems, and any other non-medical request. The founder of the organization is Meir Wiener. The organization is headed by Israel Almasi and Lazzy Stern.

== See also ==
- Motor club
