= Joe Lobenstein =

British politician (1927-2015)

Josef "Joe" Lobenstein MBE (April 1927 – 28 June 2015) was a spokesman for the Union of Orthodox Hebrew Congregations and a former Conservative politician in London.

Lobenstein managed an electrical wholesale business.

== Political career ==
Lobenstein entered local politics in 1962 as a member of the former Metropolitan Borough of Stoke Newington. In 1968 he became a councillor for the London Borough of Hackney. Mr. Lobenstein served in many capacities, as an alderman from 1971 to 1974 and as chair of the Planning and Highways Committee from 1970 to 1971.

Lobenstein, served as a Councillor in Hackney for more than thirty years. For many years, he was the only non-Labour party councillor in Hackney. He was the Mayor of Hackney Borough Council four times in a row.

He was the leader of the Conservative group of Councillors until 1997.

== Jewish Community Leader ==
Lobenstein was the president of the Adath Yisroel Synagogue. In 2012 Joe Lobenstein was appointed as President of the Stamford Hill Shomrim, a Jewish volunteer Neighbourhood Patrol Group. He was formerly the vice-president of the Orthodox Hebrew Congregation and chairman of their external affairs committee.

== Awards ==
In 1980, Lobenstein was awarded an MBE honour for his outstanding political and social activities in the London Borough of Hackney. In 1997, he was awarded Freedom of the Borough in honour of his eminent service to the Council and the borough.

== Personal life ==
In 1939, Lobenstein, along with his family, fled from Hanover to escape the Nazis. He and his wife Bella had eight children. Lobenstein died in London at the age of 88 on 28 June 2015.
