= Samuel Hirsch (lawyer) =

Entrepreneur, son of entrepreneurs

Samuel P. Hirsch (born c. 1948) is an American lawyer who also held public office.

== Early life ==
He was born in a DP camp to Holocaust-survivor parents who came to the United States a year later. In the way of his parents, he is an Orthodox Jew.

His Juris Doctor degree is from New York University School of Law (1972) and his first law position was with Jacob D. Fuchsberg.

== Career ==
=== Elected official ===
In 1977 he won a three-way primary and, after a three-way November election, became a New York State Assemblyman (48th District). His seat had been vacated by Leonard Silverman, who accepted an offered judgeship mid-term.

In 1982 he was challenged by Dov Hikind in the September primary; Hikind received about 500 more votes.

One of the issues for which he represented his community is reverse discrimination. Another was in the matter of more police protection, especially in the aftermath of "the fatal stabbing of an elderly Jewish man in a predawn street robbery."

=== Lawyer ===
In 2002 he filed a Class action lawsuit against McDonald's for alleged deceptive practices that resulted in obesity, particularly among teenagers; it was rejected in a Federal court. The ruling permitted refiling, which he did. It too was rejected.

His "bread and butter" cases are in the area of personal injury.

== Family ==
He and his wife Ruth are the parents of four children and grandparents of six.

New York State Assembly
Preceded by Leonard Silverman	Member of the New York State Assembly from the 48th district 1977–1983	Succeeded by Dov Hikind
