= New York's 48th State Assembly district =

American legislative district

Assemblymember
Simcha Eichenstein; D–Borough Park

New York's 48th State Assembly district is one of the 150 districts in the New York State Assembly. It has been represented by Democrat Simcha Eichenstein since 2019.

== Geography ==
=== 2020s ===
District 48 is in Brooklyn. It covers most of the communities of Borough Park and Midwood, and includes portions of Parkville, and southern Kensington.

The district overlaps (partially) with New York's 9th and 10th congressional districts, the 21st and 22nd districts of the New York State Senate, and the 38th, 39th, 40th, 44th and 45th districts of the New York City Council.

=== 2010s ===
District 48 is in Brooklyn. It covers the community of Borough Park and portions of Midwood.

== Recent election results ==
=== 2026 ===
2026 New York State Assembly election, District 48
Party	Candidate	Votes	%
Democratic	Simcha Eichenstein		
Conservative	Simcha Eichenstein		
Total	Simcha Eichenstein (incumbent)		
Write-in			
Total votes			100.0

=== 2024 ===
2024 New York State Assembly election, District 48
Party	Candidate	Votes	%
Democratic	Simcha Eichenstein	12,539	
Conservative	Simcha Eichenstein	12,104	
Total	Simcha Eichenstein (incumbent)	24,643	98.9
Write-in		279	1.1
Total votes		24,922	100.0
Democratic hold			

=== 2022 ===
2022 New York State Assembly election, District 48
Party	Candidate	Votes	%
Democratic	Simcha Eichenstein	11,341	
Conservative	Simcha Eichenstein	9,970	
Total	Simcha Eichenstein (incumbent)	21,311	94.7
Working Families	Linda Holmes	1,056	4.7
Write-in		140	0.6
Total votes		22,507	100.0
Democratic hold			

=== 2020 ===
Assemblyman Simcha Eichenstein was elected to a second term, but received the most votes as the Conservative candidate. Notably, this would be the first election (federal or state) since 1970 in which the party would receive the most votes.

2020 New York State Assembly election, District 48
Party	Candidate	Votes	%
Conservative	Simcha Eichenstein	13,411	
Democratic	Simcha Eichenstein	12,570	
Total	Simcha Eichenstein (incumbent)	25,981	98.6
Write-in		375	1.4
Total votes		26,356	100.0
Democratic hold			

=== 2018 ===
2018 New York State Assembly election, District 48
Party	Candidate	Votes	%
Democratic	Simcha Eichenstein	9,702	
Conservative	Simcha Eichenstein	6,096	
Total	Simcha Eichenstein	15,168	95.1
Write-in		787	4.9
Total votes		15,955	100.0
Democratic hold			

=== 2016 ===
2016 New York State Assembly election, District 48
Primary election
Party	Candidate	Votes	%
Republican	Dov Hikind (write-in)	253	60.2
Write-in		167	39.8
Total votes		420	100
General election
Republican	Dov Hikind	11,076	
Democratic	Dov Hikind	10,320	
Conservative	Dov Hikind	1,722	
Total	Dov Hikind (incumbent)	23,118	99.2
Write-in		176	0.1
Total votes		23,294	100
Democratic hold			

=== 2014 ===
2014 New York State Assembly election, District 48
Party	Candidate	Votes	%
Democratic	Dov Hikind	9,743	
Conservative	Dov Hikind	2,574	
Total	Dov Hikind (incumbent)	12,317	78.2
Republican	Nachman Caller	3,240	
Housing and Jobs	Nachman Caller	144	
Total	Nachman Caller	3,384	21.5
Write-in		57	0.3
Total votes		15,758	100.0
Democratic hold			

=== 2012 ===
2012 New York State Assembly election, District 48
Primary election
Party	Candidate	Votes	%
Democratic	Dov Hikind (incumbent)	3,138	83.7
Democratic	Mitchell Tischler	586	15.6
Write-in		24	0.7
Total votes		3,748	100
General election
Democratic	Dov Hikind	18,279	
Tax Cuts Now	Dov Hikind	985	
Total	Dov Hikind (incumbent)	19,264	93.9
School Choice	Mitchell Tischler	1,216	6.0
Write-in		45	0.1
Total votes		20,525	100
Democratic win (new boundaries)			

=== 2010 ===
2010 New York State Assembly election, District 48
Party	Candidate	Votes	%
Democratic	Dov Hikind (incumbent)	9,713	65.0
Republican	Brian Doherty	4,408	
Conservative	Brian Doherty	806	
Total	Brian Doherty	5,214	34.9
Write-in		12	0.1
Total votes		14,939	100.0
Democratic hold			

=== 2008 ===
2008 New York State Assembly election, District 48
Party	Candidate	Votes	%
Republican	Dov Hikind	10,521	
Democratic	Dov Hikind	8,397	
Total	Dov Hikind (incumbent)	18,918	94.3
Conservative	Herbert Ryan	1,139	5.7
Write-in		5	0.0
Total votes		20,062	100.0
Democratic hold			

=== 2006 ===
2006 New York State Assembly election, District 48
Party	Candidate	Votes	%
Democratic	Dov Hikind	5,099	
Republican	Dov Hikind	4,543	
Total	Dov Hikind (incumbent)	9,642	92.4
Conservative	Herbert Ryan	788	7.6
Write-in		4	0.0
Total votes		10,434	100.0
Democratic hold			

=== 2004 ===
2004 New York State Assembly election, District 48
Party	Candidate	Votes	%
Republican	Dov Hikind	10,992	
Democratic	Dov Hikind	9,044	
Total	Dov Hikind (incumbent)	20,036	94.7
Conservative	Herbert Ryan	1,126	5.3
Write-in		2	0.0
Total votes		21,164	100.0
Democratic hold			

=== 2002 ===
2002 New York State Assembly election, District 48
Party	Candidate	Votes	%
Republican	Dov Hikind	6,331	
Democratic	Dov Hikind	5,762	
Total	Dov Hikind (incumbent)	12,093	93.7
Conservative	John Toolan	814	6.3
Write-in		1	0.0
Total votes		12,908	100.0
Democratic hold			

=== 2000 ===
2000 New York State Assembly election, District 48
Party	Candidate	Votes	%
Democratic	Dov Hikind	10,918	
Republican	Dov Hikind	7,556	
Total	Dov Hikind (incumbent)	18,474	94.5
Conservative	John Toolan	1,060	5.4
Write-in		9	0.0
Total votes		19,543	100.0

=== Federal results in Assembly District 48 ===
Year	Office	Results
2024	President	Trump 84.5 – 14.1%
2024	Senate	Sapraicone 74.4 - 24.5%
2022	Senate	Pinion 59.6 – 40.1%
2020	President	Trump 78.7 – 20.6%
2018	Senate	Farley 63.7 – 36.3%
2016	President	Trump 69.3 – 28.3%
2016	Senate	Schumer 65.2 – 33.5%
2012	President	Romney 75.6 – 23.7%
2012	Senate	Gillibrand 51.5 – 47.6%
