= Leonard Silverman =

American politician

Member of the New York State Assembly
- In office 1969–1977
- Preceded by: Joseph Kottler
- Succeeded by: Samuel Hirsch
- Constituency: 48th District

Personal details
- Born: November 10, 1930 Brooklyn, New York City, U.S.
- Died: September 7, 2015 (aged 84) Woodmere, Nassau County, U.S.
- Party: Democratic
- Education: New York University, Brooklyn Law School
- Profession: Lawyer, Judge

Leonard Silverman (November 10, 1930 – September 7, 2015) was an American lawyer and politician from New York.

== Life ==
He was born on November 10, 1930, in Brooklyn, New York City. He graduated from New York University, and in 1954 from Brooklyn Law School.

Silverman entered politics as a Democrat, and was a member of the New York State Assembly (48th D.) from 1969 to 1977, sitting in the 178th, 179th, 180th, 181st and 182nd New York State Legislatures. He was Chairman of the Committee on Insurance.

On May 6, 1977, he was appointed to the New York Court of Claims and remained on the bench until 2004.

He died on September 7, 2015, in Woodmere, Nassau County, New York; and was buried at the Mount Carmel Cemetery in Glendale, Queens. He was Jewish.

New York State Assembly
Preceded by Joseph Kottler	New York State Assembly; 48th District; 1969–1977	Succeeded by Samuel Hirsch
