= Dov Hikind =

American politician and activist (born 1950)

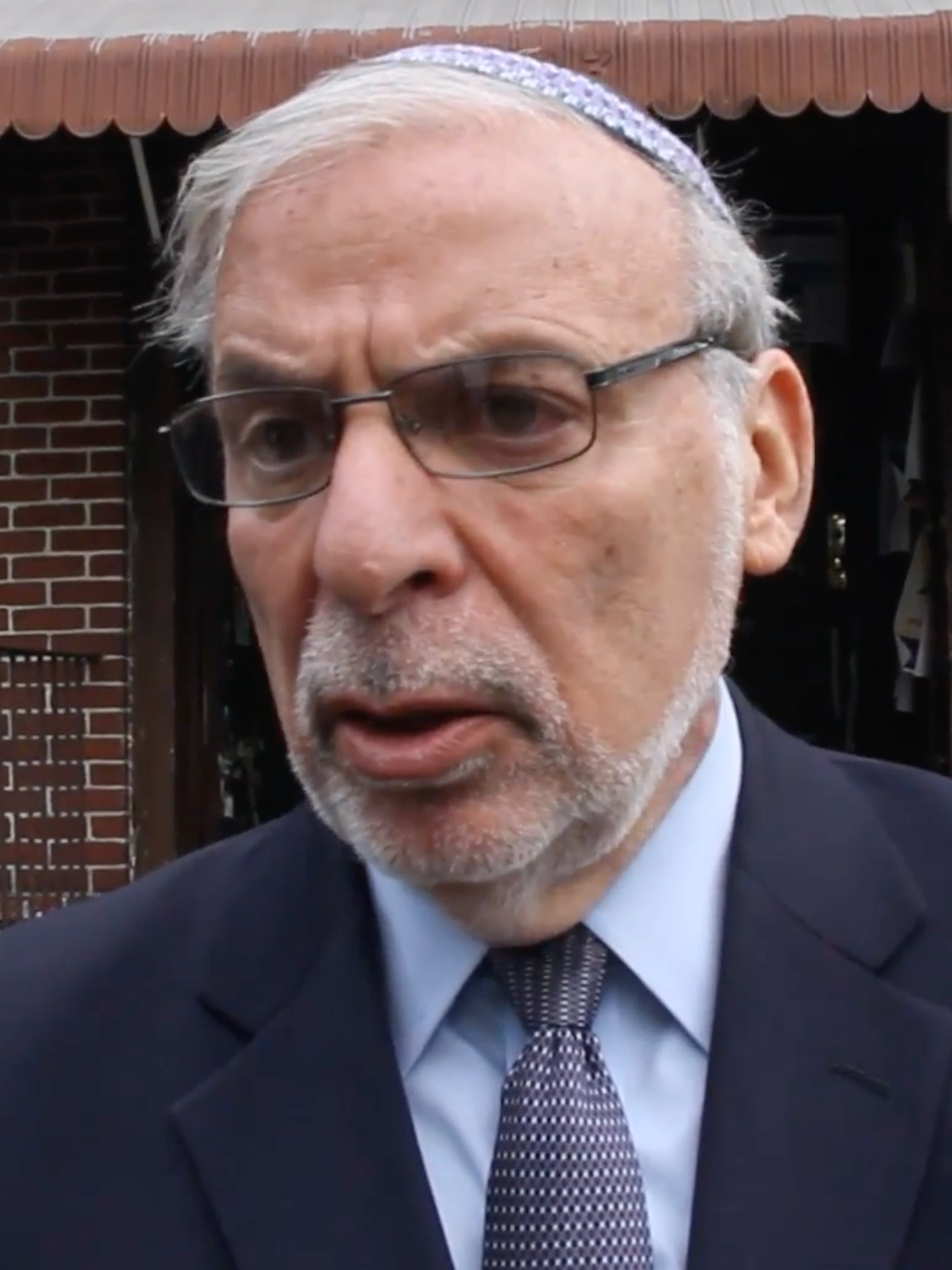
- Hikind in 2017

Member of the New York State Assembly from the 48th district
- In office January 5, 1983 – December 31, 2018
- Preceded by: Samuel Hirsch
- Succeeded by: Simcha Eichenstein

Personal details
- Born: Dov Bernard Hikind; June 30, 1950 (age 76) Brooklyn, New York City, U.S.
- Party: Republican (2023–present); Democratic (until 2023)
- Spouse: Shoshana Hikind
- Children: 3
- Education: Queens College (BA); Brooklyn College (MA)
- Occupation: Politician; activist; radio show host

Dov Bernard Hikind (born June 30, 1950) is an American politician, activist, and radio talk show host who served in New York State Assembly representing the 48th district from 1983 to 2018. Hikind was a Democrat throughout his tenure, but joined the Republican Party in 2023.

== Early life and education ==
Hikind grew up in a Haredi Jewish family in Williamsburg, Brooklyn, his father being a devout follower of the Vizhnitz Hasidic dynasty. His parents were both Holocaust survivors, with his mother being liberated from Auschwitz. He has a BA from Queens College, and a MA from Brooklyn College.

== Politics ==
Hikind endorsed Michael Bloomberg the first two times he ran for mayor of New York City, then switched his endorsement to the challenger Bill Thompson in the 2009 election. During his decades as a Democrat, Hikind had broken ranks with his party in endorsements, most notably in his endorsement of Republican gubernatorial candidates George Pataki in 1994 and Lee Zeldin in 2022; Republican presidential nominees George W. Bush in 2000 and 2004, John McCain in 2008, Mitt Romney in 2012, and Donald Trump in 2016 and 2020; and Republican Inna Vernikov for New York City Council.

Described by the Jewish Telegraphic Agency and The New York Times as a conservative Democrat, Hikind believes that the national party has moved too far to the left, particularly on social issues, for the liking of many of his constituents. His district had long been one of the most conservative districts in New York City. For instance, it gave Donald Trump 69 percent of the vote in 2016, his second-best showing in the entire state; only the Staten Island-based 62nd Assembly District gave him a higher percentage of the vote. In 2012, it gave Romney 75 percent of the vote, his best showing in the state.

Hikind expressed interest in the special election for the New York's 9th congressional district seat vacated by Anthony Weiner; Hikind did not expect the Democrats to nominate him, and considered running as a Republican.

In 2017, Hikind's son Yoni ran for the City Council in District 44 against Kalman Yeger, David Greenfield's hand-picked successor who was on the Democratic party line; in order to avoid a primary, the younger Hikind collected petitions to run on his own party line called "Our Neighborhood".

In 2018, Hikind retired from the New York State Assembly, proclaiming support for his successor Simcha Eichenstein.

On July 20, 2023, Hikind along with his wife Shani, announced on Twitter that they were changing their party affiliation from Democratic to Republican.

Hikind hosts a weekly radio talk show in New York City.

== Policy positions ==
=== Israel ===
Hikind is a pro-Israel activist. In the 1980s he was a member of the Jewish Defense League, and a follower of convicted terrorist Meir Kahane. He was also friends with activist Chaim Ben Pesach. Hikind broke with Kahane after Kahane moved to Israel and became more aggressive in his views against Arabs. In an interview with Robert I. Friedman, Hikind stated that he supported forming a group of "intelligent professionals" to assassinate Nazis and Arab-American supporters of the Palestine Liberation Organization. In 2001, he argued that the Madame Tussauds New York wax museum should remove its wax statue of the Palestinian leader Yassir Arafat, saying that he was a terrorist whose image should not be in New York.

=== Subway security ===
Hikind was instrumental in arranging for the allocation of $1.2 million in a project that helped to install 120 closed-circuit television security cameras in nine South Brooklyn subway stations that are located in Jewish neighborhoods such as Borough Park, Midwood, Kensington, and Parkville. He stated that the project was prompted by "concerns that the Jewish community would be targeted" by terrorists. Hikind encouraged politicians to do the same in other subway stations, which now lag behind those of his community. The New York Times revealed that the Metropolitan Transportation Authority had granted close to $600 million in funds for security to stations in New York City in late 2002; however, only a small fraction of it had been used productively by 2005.

=== The Passion of the Christ ===
In 2003, Hikind and a group of supporters protested Mel Gibson's film The Passion of the Christ. He led about 50 Jewish leaders and supporters to the Fox News offices in Manhattan in a demonstration. Hikind was vocal in his anger against the movie, stating: "It will result in anti-Semitism and bigotry. It really takes us back to the Dark Ages ... the Inquisition, the Crusades, all for the so-called sin of the Crucifixion of Jesus." Hikind said the film "is unhealthy for Jews all over the world."

=== United Nations ===
Hikind is part of a group of New York state legislators that has consistently attempted to block plans to renovate the headquarters of the United Nations, calling the UN anti-American and anti-Israel.

Hikind criticized President Barack Obama for abstaining on UN Security Council Resolution 2234, which criticized Israeli settlement activity in the occupied West Bank and East Jerusalem, calling the UN a "cesspool".

=== Same-sex marriage ===
After voting against a same-sex marriage bill in the New York State Assembly, Hikind claimed that same-sex marriage can lead to the acceptance of incest, maintaining that, "If we authorize gay marriage in the state of New York, those who want to live and love incestuously will be five steps closer to achieving their goals as well." On June 15, 2011, after the New York State Assembly passed a bill to legalize gay marriage, Hikind said gay marriage is wrong in the eyes of God.

=== David Irving letter ===
On October 20, 2009, at the insistence of Hikind and twelve other New York State and City officeholders in a letter to American Express CEO Kenneth Chenault, the company rescinded its Merchants Agreement with prominent Holocaust denier David Irving.

=== Oswego High School Holocaust assignment ===
In response to what he deemed a "stab in the back to Holocaust survivors", Hikind called for the resignation of New York State Education Commissioner MaryEllen Elia on April 3, 2017, for her support of an Oswego High School assignment that asked students to put themselves in Adolf Hitler's shoes to argue for or against the "Final Solution". Elia had defended the assignment as one that allegedly fostered "critical thinking".

== Incidents involving Hikind ==
=== Profiling ===
Hikind has advocated for the profiling of Muslims of Middle Eastern and South Asian background as a response to terrorism. In 2005, he sponsored a bill to allow police to focus on Middle-Eastern men in subway bag searches. At a news conference, holding up photos of Muslim men, he said: "The individuals involved [in terrorism] basically look like this. Why must police think twice before examining people of a particular group?" Civil rights groups opposed Hikind's proposal, and the New York City Police Department released a statement against it, saying that "Racial profiling is illegal, of doubtful effectiveness, and against department policy".

Following the attempted bombing of Northwest Airlines Flight 253 in December 2009, Hikind introduced a similar bill that would allow law enforcement agencies to consider race and ethnicity as "one of many factors" in selecting persons for anti-terrorism stops and searches.

=== Corruption allegations ===
In 1997, Hikind was indicted by the U.S. Attorney for allegedly receiving $40,000 in funding from the Council of Jewish Organizations of Borough Park (COJO) in exchange for hundreds of thousands of dollars in state grant money. Hikind was acquitted, while his co-defendant, an official of the organization, Rabbi Elimelech Naiman, was found guilty. The former operations director of COJO, Paul Chernick, pled guilty in a plea agreement.

In 2013, Hikind was alleged to have routinely failed to disclose payments he received from Maimonides Hospital for advertising on his syndicated show. The payments were subsequently investigated by Governor Andrew Cuomo's aborted Moreland Commission.

Hikind was accused of arranging jobs in government for friends and family members. In response, Hikind told the New York Daily News that "I help strangers, and I certainly don't discriminate against members of my family".

=== Blackface ===
Hikind wore blackface, an afro wig and sunglasses during the 2013 Purim celebration, dressing up as what he said was a basketball player. He initially defended his costume decision, pointing to the "anything goes" tradition of Purim, but eventually apologized, saying that he didn't mean to offend anyone. Charles Barron said that Hikind's apology was not enough, asking Sheldon Silver to remove Hikind from his position of assistant majority leader.

=== Lawsuit against Alexandria Ocasio-Cortez ===
Hikind filed a lawsuit against U.S. Representative Alexandria Ocasio-Cortez for blocking him on Twitter. On November 4, 2019, it was announced that they settled the lawsuit, with Ocasio-Cortez issuing a statement apologizing for the block.

== Personal life ==
Hikind is married, and has three children: Yoni, Shmuel, and Deena. Yoni and Shmuel both work as social workers in the Jewish community in Brooklyn.

New York State Assembly
Preceded by Samuel Hirsch	Member of the New York State Assembly from the 48th district 1983–2018	Succeeded by Simcha Eichenstein
