= Simcha Eichenstein =

American politician (born 1983)

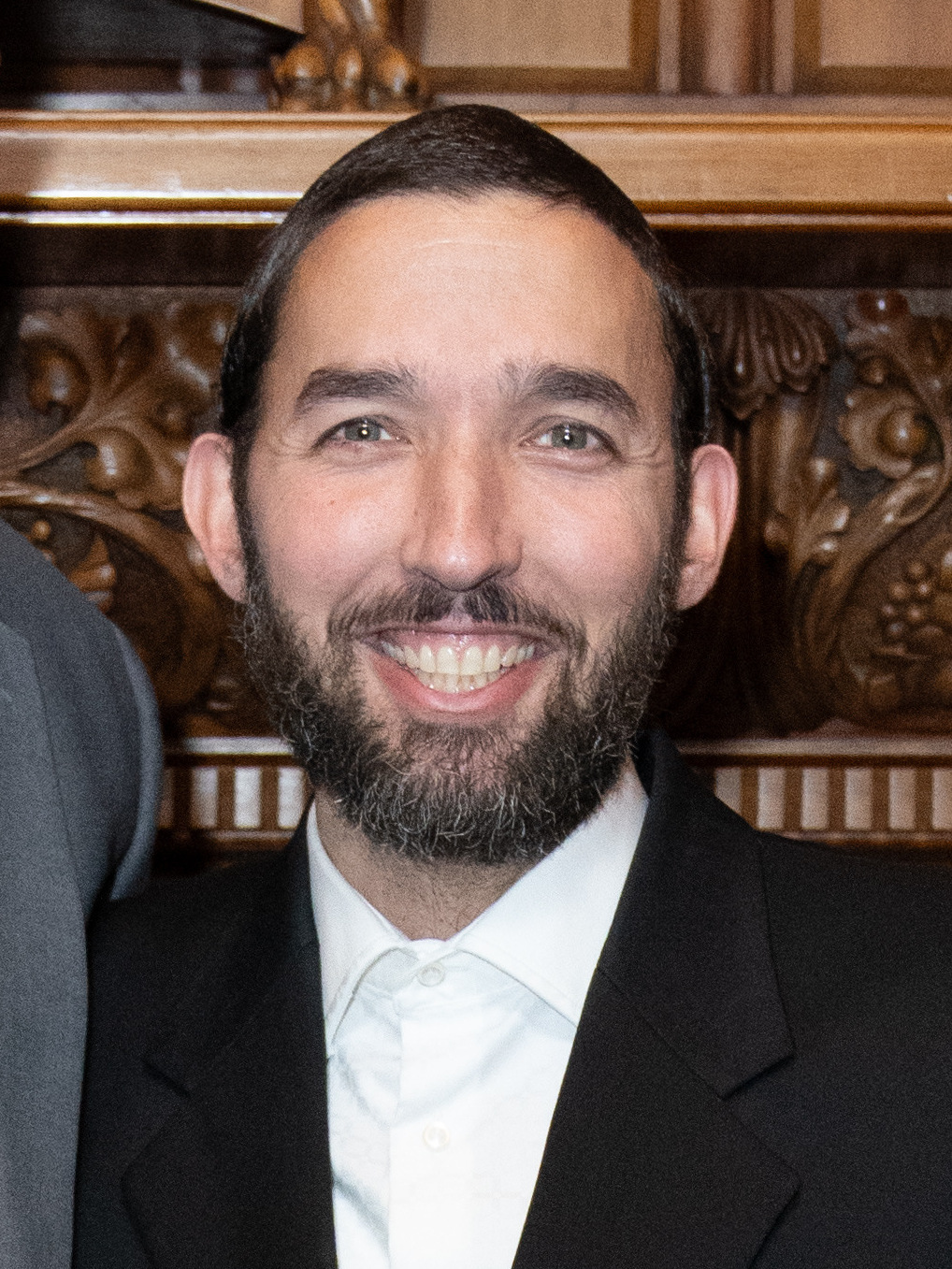
- Eichenstein in 2025

Member of the New York State Assembly from the 48th district
- Incumbent
- Assumed office January 2, 2019
- Preceded by: Dov Hikind

Personal details
- Born: August 6, 1983 (age 43) Brooklyn, New York, U.S.
- Party: Democratic
- Children: 4
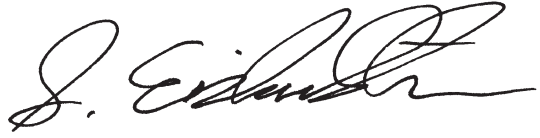
- Signature
- Website: State Assembly website

Simcha Eichenstein (born August 6, 1983) is an American politician from New York. He is a member of the New York State Assembly.

== Early life ==
Simcha Eichenstein was born to a rabbi from a prominent Bobover rabbinical family in Borough Park, Brooklyn, where he grew up and attended yeshivas.

In July 2011, Eichenstein, by then a known political operative, was at the front lines of the search for the suspect in the murder of Leiby Kletzky. His wife helped to identify Levi Aron through her job as a receptionist at the dentist's office that Aron was a patron of.

== Political career ==
Eichenstein started his career as an aide to political consultant Ezra Friedlander.

From 2011 until 2015, Eichenstein was the senior adviser to New York State Comptroller Thomas DiNapoli. Following this, he was director of political and governmental services to the Mayor of New York City, Bill de Blasio.

On April 26, 2018, Eichenstein announced his candidacy for the open New York State Assembly District 48 seat, covering most of Borough Park and part of Midwood, Brooklyn, being vacated by Dov Hikind. He won the seat unopposed in the general election, becoming the first Hasidic lawmaker from Brooklyn elected to any level of government. As Hikind's hand-picked successor, Eichenstein was considered to be the front-runner in the race, running unopposed as the Democratic candidate in the primary election in September 2018. His candidacy was supported by Rebbes of various Hasidic sects, including Bobov, Satmar, Ger, and Belz, as well as by Senator Charles Schumer, former Senator Joe Lieberman, and New York City Mayor Bill de Blasio.

Eichenstein has strongly opposed the government mandating secular education in Hasidic schools.

In March 2020, Eichenstein co-sponsored a bill promoted by Pamela Hunter that sought to end driver license suspensions for drivers with unpaid fines, saying: "Without a driver's license, a person cannot drive to work or to school, or even to court to pay their fine... Let's keep our safe and responsible drivers on the roads, instead of being embroiled in needless and wasteful court appearances... This new legislation would represent a victory for all New York drivers."

In October 2020, during the COVID-19 pandemic, Eichenstein said he was "outraged" with the "draconian measures" implemented by Governor Andrew Cuomo to curb the spread of coronavirus in various neighborhoods of New York City.

=== Committees ===
Assembly Speaker Carl Heastie appointed Eichenstein to serve on a number of committees, including Aging, Cities, Housing, Real Property Taxation, and Social Services. Eichenstein serves as Chair of the Subcommittee on Outreach and Oversight of Senior Citizen Programs.

== Personal life ==
Eichenstein is married, and the father of four children. He is a life-long resident of Borough Park, Brooklyn.
