= Brockley (2002 ward) =

Electoral ward in London, England

- Electoral ward for the Lewisham London Borough Council
- Brockley ward boundaries since 2022
- Borough: Lewisham
- County: Greater London
- Population: 17,498 (2021) (Note: 2021 Census data reported for 2022 ward boundaries)
- Major settlements: Brockley; Deptford; New Cross
- Area: 1.654 square kilometres (0.639 sq mi)

Current electoral ward
- Created: 2002
- Number of members: 3
- Councillors: Stephen Penfold; Sian Eiles; Ayesha Lahai-Taylor
- ONS code: 00AZGF (2002–2022)
- GSS code: E05000439 (2002–2022); E05013716 (2022–present)

Brockley is an electoral ward in the London Borough of Lewisham. The ward was first used in the 2002 elections and elects three councillors to Lewisham London Borough Council.

== List of councillors ==
Seat	Councillor	Took office	Left office	Party	Election
1	Darren Johnson	2002	2014	Green	2002, 2006, 2010
2	Jimi Adefiranye	2002	2006	Labour	2002
3	Terrence Scott	2002	2006	Labour	2002
2	Romayne Phoenix	2006	2010	Green	2006
3	Dean Walton	2006	2010	Green	2006
2	Vicky Foxcroft	2010	2014	Labour	2010
3	Jimi Adefiranye	2010	2022	Labour	2010, 2014, 2018
1	Alicia Kennedy	2014	2016	Labour	2014
2	John Coughlin	2014	2018	Green	2014
1	Sophie McGeevor	2016	2022	Labour	2016, 2018
2	Stephen Penfold	2018	Incumbent	Labour	2018
1	Sian Eiles	2022	Incumbent	Labour	2022
3	Ayesha Lahai-Taylor	2022	Incumbent	Labour	2022

== Summary ==
Councillors elected by party at each general borough election.

- Green
- Labour

== Lewisham council elections since 2022 ==
There was a revision of ward boundaries in Lewisham in 2022.

=== 2022 election ===
The election took place on 5 May 2022.

2022 Lewisham London Borough Council election: Brockley
Party	Candidate	Votes	%	±%
Labour	Sian Eiles	2,478	62.4	
Labour	Ayesha Lahai-Taylor	2,276	57.4	
Labour	Stephen Penfold	1,937	48.8	
Green	Deborah Le'Cand-Hardwood	1,153	29.1	
Green	Peter ap Seisyllt	1,041	26.2	
Green	Mike Keogh	1,025	25.8	
Liberal Democrats	Richard Elliott	346	8.7	
Liberal Democrats	Karen Pratt	283	7.1	
Conservative	Ulric Almqvist	267	6.7	
Liberal Democrats	Mark Morris	257	6.5	
Conservative	Julie Killip	254	6.4	
Conservative	John-Joe O'Connor	221	5.6	
Independent	Ray Barron-Woolford	154	3.9	
Independent	Toni-Ann Gurdon	125	3.1	
Independent	Stewart Lendor	88	2.2	
Turnout			34.4	
Labour win (new boundaries)				
Labour win (new boundaries)				
Labour win (new boundaries)				

== 2002–2022 Lewisham council elections ==
Brockley ward boundaries from 2002 to 2022

There was a revision of ward boundaries in Lewisham in 2002. The new Brockley ward was created without any overlap of territory with the earlier 1965 Brockley ward.

=== 2018 election ===
The election took place on 3 May 2018.

2018 Lewisham London Borough Council election: Brockley
Party	Candidate	Votes	%	±%
Labour	Sophie McGeevor	2,606	55.3	+14.4
Labour	Jimi Adefiranye	2,448	51.9	+6.0
Labour	Stephen Penfold	2,040	43.3	+11.1
Green	John Coughlin	1,457	30.9	−2.4
Green	Clare Lorraine	1,260	26.7	−0.8
Green	Harvir Sangha	911	19.3	−6.3
Women's Equality	Kate Vang	542	11.5	N/A
Liberal Democrats	Marcus Mayers	322	6.8	+0.6
Conservative	Fraser Archer	318	6.7	−2.0
Conservative	John O'Connor	302	6.4	−1.7
Liberal Democrats	Brenda Murray	295	6.3	+2.4
Conservative	Christopher Wilford	242	5.1	−2.4
Liberal Democrats	Martin Passande	202	4.3	+0.8
TUSC	Ellen Peers	74	1.6	−2.4
Majority				
Turnout			38	
Labour hold		Swing		
Labour hold		Swing		
Labour gain from Green		Swing		

=== 2016 by-election ===
The by-election took place on 13 October 2016, following the resignation of Alicia Kennedy.

2016 Brockley by-election
Party	Candidate	Votes	%	±%
Labour	Sophie McGeevor	1,190	48.0	+9.5
Green	Clare Phipps	631	25.4	−2.6
Liberal Democrats	Bobby Dean	259	10.4	+5.2
Conservative	Andrew Hughes	195	7.9	+0.6
Women's Equality	Rebecca Jones	173	7.0	+7.0
UKIP	Hugh Waine	33	1.3	−3.6
Majority		559	22.5	
Turnout		2,481		
Labour hold		Swing		

=== 2014 election ===
The election took place on 22 May 2014.

2014 Lewisham London Borough Council election: Brockley
Party	Candidate	Votes	%	±%
Labour	Jimi Adefiranye	2,052	45.9	+10.0
Labour	Alicia Kennedy	1,828	40.9	+2.3
Green	John Coughlin	1,495	33.4	−0.5
Labour	Jonathan Watts	1,442	32.2	+1.3
Green	Violeta Vajda	1,228	27.5	+2.4
Green	Matthew Hawkins	1,144	25.6	+1.0
People Before Profit	Tobias Abse	677	15.1	+9.2
Conservative	Julie Kiston	387	8.7	−1.8
Conservative	John Cope	363	8.1	−0.9
Conservative	Roger Lewis	336	7.5	−0.8
Liberal Democrats	Emily Frith	279	6.2	−12.8
UKIP	Ken Webb	260	5.8	N/A
TUSC	Roger Shrives	181	4.0	N/A
Liberal Democrats	Brenda Murray	173	3.9	−10.7
Liberal Democrats	James Rebbeck	157	3.5	−11.0
Turnout		4,473	35.6	
Labour hold		Swing		
Labour hold		Swing		
Green hold		Swing		

=== 2010 election ===
The election on 6 May 2010 took place on the same day as the United Kingdom general election.

2010 Lewisham London Borough Council election: Brockley
Party	Candidate	Votes	%	±%
Labour	Vicky Foxcroft	2,632	38.6	
Labour	Jimi Adefiranye	2,449	35.9	
Green	Darren Johnson	2,313	33.9	
Labour	Paul Newing	2,105	30.9	
Green	Dean Walton	1,707	25.1	
Green	Romayne Phoenix	1,676	24.6	
Liberal Democrats	Keith Adderley	1,293	19.0	
Liberal Democrats	Nancy Sarre	995	14.6	
Liberal Democrats	David Morpurgo	990	14.5	
Conservative	Carolyn Freeman	713	10.5	
Conservative	Ardian Preci	611	9.0	
Conservative	Orde Solomons	563	8.3	
People Before Profit	Patrick McGinley	410	6.0	
People Before Profit	Toby Abse	403	5.9	
Turnout		6,814	59.0	
Labour gain from Green		Swing		
Labour gain from Green		Swing		
Green hold		Swing		

=== 2006 election ===
The election took place on 4 May 2006.

2006 Lewisham London Borough Council election: Brockley
Party	Candidate	Votes	%	±%
Green	Darren Johnson	1,583	50.0	
Green	Romayne Phoenix	1,223		
Green	Dean Walton	1,153		
Labour	Jimi Adefiranye	928	29.3	
Labour	Rosemary Fooks	907		
Labour	Terence Scott	870		
Liberal Democrats	Keith Adderley	300	9.5	
Liberal Democrats	Anne Timson	291		
Liberal Democrats	David Cloke	250		
Conservative	Carolyn Freeman	247	7.8	
Conservative	Darren Larking	240		
Conservative	Maureen Wayling	170		
Alliance for Green Socialism	Tobias Abse	111	3.5	
Turnout			28.5	
Green hold		Swing		
Green gain from Labour		Swing		
Green gain from Labour		Swing		

=== 2002 election ===
The election took place on 2 May 2002.

2002 Lewisham London Borough Council election: Brockley
Party	Candidate	Votes	%	±%
Green	Darren Johnson	1,026		
Labour	Jimi Adefiranye	1,019		
Labour	Terrence Scott	906		
Labour	Jarman Parmar	903		
Green	Sinna Mani	882		
Green	Dean Walton	832		
Liberal Democrats	Juliet Johnson	286		
Liberal Democrats	Keith Adderley	264		
Liberal Democrats	Charles Hedges	246		
Conservative	Carolyn Freeman	214		
Conservative	Jonathon Hayes-Bates	209		
Conservative	Colin Ockendon	159		
London Socialist	Ian Crosson	125		
London Socialist	Duncan Morrison	105		
London Socialist	Tobias Abse	91		
Turnout				
Green win (new seat)				
Labour win (new seat)				
Labour win (new seat)				
