= Lewisham London Borough Council elections =

London local authority, elections and history

A map showing the wards of Lewisham since 2022

Lewisham London Borough Council is the local authority for the London Borough of Lewisham, in London, United Kingdom. Elections are held every four years using a plurality bloc vote electoral system for the councillors and the supplementary vote electoral system for the elected mayor.

== Summary results of elections ==
	Overall control	Labour	Lib Dem	Green	Conservative	Others
2026	Green	14	0	40	0	0
2022	Labour	54	0	0	0	0
2018	Labour	54	0	0	0	0
2014	Labour	53	0	1	0	0
2010	Labour	40	12	1	1	0
2006	No overall control	26	17	6	3	2
2002	Labour	45	4	1	2	2
1998	Labour	61	4	-	2	-
1994	Labour	63	3	-	1	-
1990	Labour	58	3	-	6	-
1986	Labour	50	-	-	17	-
1982	Labour	43	-	-	24	-
1978	Labour	44	-	-	23	-
1974	Labour	51	-	-	9	-
1971	Labour	55	-	-	5	-
1968	Conservative	19	-	-	41	-
1964	Labour	45	-	-	15	-

== Council elections ==
- 1964 Lewisham London Borough Council election
- 1968 Lewisham London Borough Council election
- 1971 Lewisham London Borough Council election
- 1974 Lewisham London Borough Council election
- 1978 Lewisham London Borough Council election (boundary changes increased the number of seats by seven)
- 1982 Lewisham London Borough Council election
- 1986 Lewisham London Borough Council election
- 1990 Lewisham London Borough Council election
- 1994 Lewisham London Borough Council election (boundary changes took place but the number of seats remained the same) (Note: The Bromley and Lewisham (London Borough Boundaries) Order 1993) (Note: The Bromley, Croydon, Lambeth, Lewisham and Southwark (London Borough Boundaries) Order 1993) (Note: The Greenwich and Lewisham (London Borough Boundaries) Order 1993) (Note: The Lewisham and Southwark (London Borough Boundaries) Order 1993)
- 1998 Lewisham London Borough Council election
- 2002 Lewisham London Borough Council election (boundary changes reduced the number of seats by thirteen)
- 2006 Lewisham London Borough Council election
- 2010 Lewisham London Borough Council election
- 2014 Lewisham London Borough Council election
- 2018 Lewisham London Borough Council election
- 2022 Lewisham London Borough Council election (boundary changes took place but the number of seats remained the same)
- 2026 Lewisham London Borough Council election

== Borough result maps ==
2002 results map

2006 results map

2010 results map

2014 results map

2018 results map

2022 results map

2026 results map

== Previous wards ==
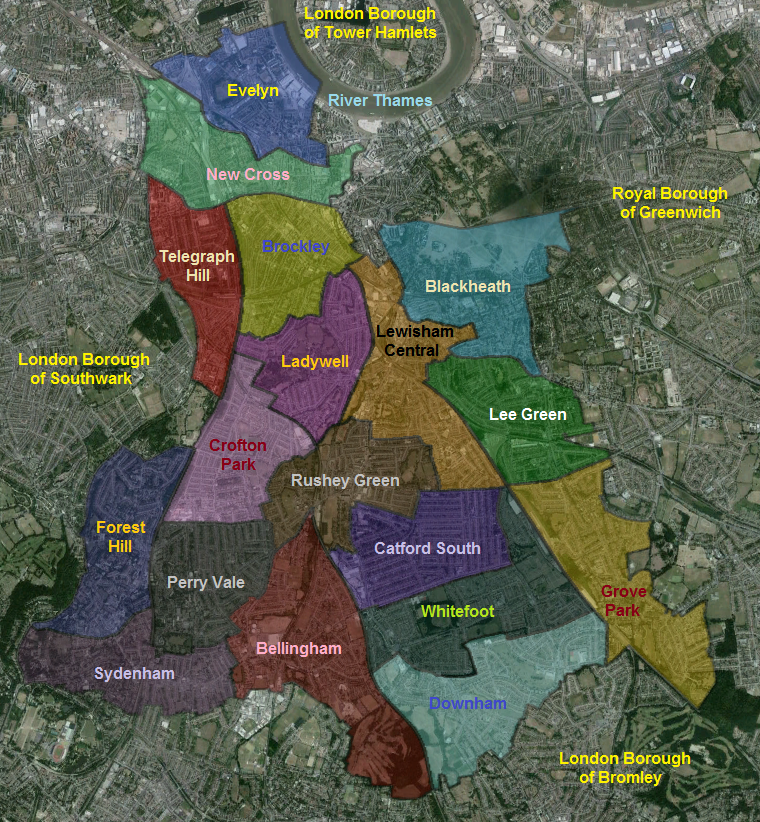
Ward map 2002–2022

The wards from 2002 to 2022 were:

- Bellingham
- Blackheath
- Brockley
- Catford
- Crofton Park
- Downham
- Evelyn
- Forest Hill
- Grove Park
- Ladywell
- Lee Green
- Lewisham Central
- New Cross
- Perry Vale
- Rushey Green
- Sydenham
- Telegraph Hill
- Whitefoot

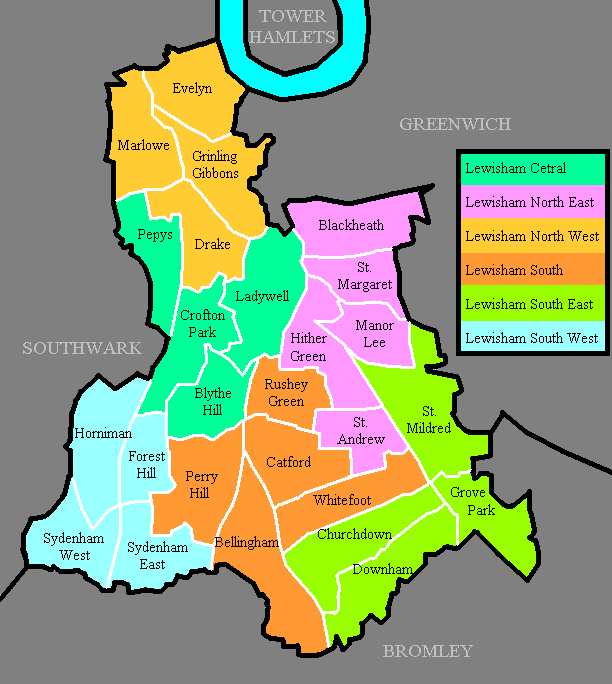
The previous 26 wards of the London Borough of Lewisham divided into 6 areas, used from 1978 to 1998

Previously the borough was divided into 26 wards and 6 areas, used for elections from 1978 to 1998. Some of these former wards had the same names as the present wards, but their borders were different. When the wards were revised for 2002, some became larger, absorbing parts of other previous wards, the number of wards changed from 26 to 18. The previous wards and areas used from 1978 to 1998 were:

Lewisham Central

- Blythe Hill
- Crofton Park
- Ladywell
- Pepys

Lewisham North East

- Blackheath
- Hither Green
- Manor Lee
- St. Andrew
- St. Margaret

Lewisham North West

- Drake
- Evelyn
- Grinling Gibbons
- Marlowe

Lewisham South

- Bellingham
- Catford
- Perry Hill
- Rushey Green
- Whitefoot

Lewisham South East

- Churchdown
- Downham
- Grove Park
- St. Mildred

Lewisham South West

- Forest Hill
- Horniman
- Sydenham East
- Sydenham West

== By-election results ==
=== 1964–1968 ===
There were no by-elections.

=== 1968–1971 ===
There were no by-elections.

=== 1971–1974 ===
Manor Lee by-election, 26 July 1973
Party	Candidate	Votes	%	±%
Labour	G. C. Hughes	978		
Conservative	P. L. Silk	786		
Liberal	C. J. Leek	374		
Communist	V. Griffin	72		
Independent Anti-Redevelopment	N. S. Fierz	19		
Majority				
Turnout			36.1	
Registered electors				
Labour hold		Swing		

Sydenham West by-election, 25 October 1973
Party	Candidate	Votes	%	±%
Conservative	D. M. Dear	1,352		
Labour	B. A. Robertson	1,217		
Liberal	I. Witherick	385		
National Front	J. F. Sandland	282		
Communist	J. Early	93		
Majority				
Turnout			31.4	
Registered electors				
Conservative gain from Labour		Swing		

=== 1974–1978 ===
St Mildred Lee by-election, 22 January 1976
Party	Candidate	Votes	%	±%
Conservative	Pamela Silk	1,634		
Labour	Peter Whipps	522		
Liberal	Derek Good	168		
Turnout			37.4	

Deptford by-election, 1 July 1976
Party	Candidate	Votes	%	±%
Labour	Peter Adams	968		
National Party	Malcolm Dixon	580		
National Front	Richard Edmonds	395		
Conservative	Gillian Elvin	256		
Turnout			26.7	

Sydenham West by-election, 4 November 1976
Party	Candidate	Votes	%	±%
Conservative	Russell George	1,863		
Labour	Benjamin Marshall	1,104		
National Front	Leigh Taylor	291		
National Party	Sydney Avis	215		
Liberal	Gwilym Savell	188		
Turnout			32.5	

=== 1990–1994 ===
Pepys by-election, 17 October 1991
Party	Candidate	Votes	%	±%
Labour	John Rudd	1,181	60.3	
Liberal Democrats	Johanna Brightwell	394	20.1	
Conservative	Douglas Stewart-Whyte	383	19.6	
Turnout			26.1	
Labour hold		Swing		

The by-election was called following the resignation of Cllr Helen Dawson.

Downham by-election, 19 March 1992
Party	Candidate	Votes	%	±%
Lib Dem Focus Team	Marc Morgan-Huws	1,555	45.7	
Labour	Norman Smith	1,225	36.0	
Conservative	Eleanor Picton	622	18.3	
Turnout			46.6	
Lib Dem Focus Team hold		Swing		

The by-election was called following the resignation of Cllr Fowler.

Catford by-election, 16 July 1992
Party	Candidate	Votes	%	±%
Conservative	Richard Greenwood	1,112	60.0	
Labour	Alan Porter	508	27.4	
Liberal Democrats	Owen Griffiths	207	11.2	
National Front	Paul Penfold	27	1.5	
Turnout			31.6	
Conservative hold		Swing		

The by-election was called following the resignation of Cllr Yard.

St Margaret by-election, 20 August 1992
Party	Candidate	Votes	%	±%
Labour	Sally Lovett	1,109	52.0	
Conservative	Janice Poulton	909	42.6	
Liberal Democrats	Ben Brooks	94	4.4	
National Front	Paul Penfold	21	1.0	
Turnout			40.1	
Labour hold		Swing		

The by-election was called following the death of Cllr Richards.

Perry Hill by-election, 15 October 1992
Party	Candidate	Votes	%	±%
Labour	Alan Till	1,419	56.5	
Conservative	Angela Bradshaw	917	36.5	
Liberal Democrats	Mark Bennett	143	5.7	
National Front	Gerrard Dickson	34	1.4	
Turnout			30.8	
Labour hold		Swing		

The by-election was called following the death of Cllr Walsh.

Ladywell by-election, 26 November 1992
Party	Candidate	Votes	%	±%
Labour	Miriam Eze	773	72.2	
Conservative	William Warren	297	27.8	
Turnout			14.7	
Labour hold		Swing		

The by-election was called following the resignation of Cllr Doyle.

=== 1994–1998 ===
Downham by-election, 18 May 1995
Party	Candidate	Votes	%	±%
Labour	Roy Stevens	1,215		
Liberal Democrats	Mai Davies	1,037		
Conservative	Barry Olley	306		
Independent Liberal	Henry Middleton	86		
Green	Ronald Wilson	15		
Turnout				
Labour gain from Liberal Democrats		Swing		

The by-election was called following the resignation of Cllr Morgan-Huws.

Grove Park by-election, 20 July 1995
Party	Candidate	Votes	%	±%
Labour	Aaron Green	875		
Conservative	Barrie Anderson	619		
Green	Hayley Trueman	66		
Liberal Democrats	Adebayo Adetona	53		
Independent	Toby Alcock	19		
Turnout				
Labour hold		Swing		

The by-election was called following the resignation of Cllr Macdonald.

Pepys by-election, 25 April 1996
Party	Candidate	Votes	%	±%
Labour	Alan Hall	1,044		
Militant Labour	Michael Suter	223		
Green	Jonathan Daniels	173		
Conservative	David Richards	157		
Liberal Democrats	Peter Wells	57		
Turnout				
Labour hold		Swing		

The by-election was called following the death of Cllr Rudd.

Blackheath by-election, 1 May 1997
Party	Candidate	Votes	%	±%
Labour	Andrew Brown	1,852		
Conservative	Dorothy Stollery	1,000		
Liberal Democrats	Tim Prater	503		
Green	Dean Walton	121		
Turnout				
Labour hold		Swing		

The by-election was called following the resignation of Cllr Nash.

Churchdown by-election, 1 May 1997
Party	Candidate	Votes	%	±%
Labour	David Bodimeade	2,533		
Conservative	Gilly Greensitt	1,315		
Liberal Democrats	Linda Hawkins	599		
Green	Hayley Trueman	105		
Turnout				
Labour hold		Swing		

The by-election was called following the resignation of Cllr Jordan.

Churchdown by-election, 24 July 1997
Party	Candidate	Votes	%	±%
Labour	Kathleen McGarrigle	799		
Liberal Democrats	Tim Prater	558		
Conservative	Andrew Lee	411		
Socialist Labour	James Dunn	104		
Green	Hayley Trueman	20		
Turnout				
Labour hold		Swing		

The by-election was called following the resignation of Cllr Moran.

=== 1998–2002 ===
Grinling Gibbons by-election, 26 November 1998
Party	Candidate	Votes	%	±%
Labour	Vanessa Large	374		
Green	Sharon Mattey	108		
Ind. Socialist	Ian Page	102		
Conservative	Ulric Almqvist	101		
Liberal Democrats	Neil Stockley	69		
Turnout				
Labour hold		Swing		

The by-election was called following the resignation of Cllr Brown.

Downham by-election, 8 April 1999
Party	Candidate	Votes	%	±%
Liberal Democrats	Catherine Priddey	1,281		
Labour	Paul Upex	572		
Conservative	Charles Cramp	186		
Independent Labour	Paul Nichols	54		
Turnout				
Liberal Democrats hold		Swing		

The by-election was called following the resignation of Cllr Stevens.

Pepys by-election, 10 June 1999
Party	Candidate	Votes	%	±%
Socialist	Ian Page	786		
Labour	Paul Upex	663		
Green	Dean Walton	182		
Conservative	Gianfranco Letizia	170		
Liberal Democrats	Adebayo Adetona	143		
Turnout				
Socialist gain from Labour		Swing		

The by-election was called following the resignation of Cllr Hall.

Churchdown by-election, 15 July 1999
Party	Candidate	Votes	%	±%
Labour	Alicia Chater	793		
Liberal Democrats	David Buxton	609		
Conservative	Neil Weatherall	431		
Ind. Socialist	Jill Mountford	66		
Turnout				
Labour hold		Swing		

The by-election was called following the resignation of Cllr Conway.

Pepys by-election, 23 November 2000
Party	Candidate	Votes	%	±%
Socialist	Samantha Dias	567		
Labour	Samuel Owolabi	533		
Conservative	Michael Vearncombe	138		
Green	Dean Walton	128		
Liberal Democrats	Keith Adderley	74		
Turnout				
Socialist gain from Labour		Swing		

The by-election was called following the resignation of Cllr Margaret.

Marlowe by-election, 8 February 2001
Party	Candidate	Votes	%	±%
Labour	Sabina Padmore	600		
Socialist Alliance	Robert Gardiner	174		
Conservative	Gail Spencer	110		
Liberal Democrats	Alex Folkes	98		
Turnout				
Labour hold		Swing		

The by-election was called following the resignation of Cllr Gordon.

Bellingham by-election, 8 November 2001
Party	Candidate	Votes	%	±%
Labour	Steve Bullock	584		
Conservative	Derek Stone	203		
Liberal Democrats	Alexander Freakes	67		
Turnout				
Labour hold		Swing		

The by-election was called following the resignation of Cllr O’Shea.

=== 2002–2006 ===
Lee Green by-election, 10 October 2002
Party	Candidate	Votes	%	±%
Liberal Democrats	Rachael Collins	842		
Labour	Paul Morris	798		
Conservative	Joanna Britton	568		
Green	Anna Baker	167		
BNP	Barry Roberts	82		
CPA	Marcus Iles	58		
UKIP	Ralph Atkinson	25		
Turnout				
Liberal Democrats gain from Labour		Swing		

The by-election was called following the resignation of Cllr Sullivan.

Downham by-election, 7 November 2002
Party	Candidate	Votes	%	±%
Liberal Democrats	Mark Morris	998		
Labour	Andrew Tucker	769		
BNP	Mary Culnane	519		
Conservative	Raymond Woolford	259		
Socialist Alliance	Jean Kysow	41		
Turnout				
Liberal Democrats gain from Labour		Swing		

The by-election was called following the resignation of Cllr Fallon.

Lewisham Central by-election, 23 October 2003
Party	Candidate	Votes	%	±%
Liberal Democrats	Andrew Milton	1,054		
Labour	Christopher Watt	869		
Conservative	James Cleverly	654		
Green	Susan Luxton	154		
UKIP	Ralph Atkinson	44		
CPA	Sonia Chambers	41		
Turnout				
Liberal Democrats gain from Labour		Swing		

The by-election was called following the resignation of Cllr Singha.

Telegraph Hill by-election, 4 December 2003
Party	Candidate	Votes	%	±%
Socialist	Christopher Flood	590		
Labour	Ami Ibitson	490		
Local Education Action by Parents	Marie-Louise Irvine	355		
Liberal Democrats	Sarah Williams	155		
Conservative	David Furze	121		
Green	Dean Walton	88		
UKIP	Ralph Atkinson	9		
Turnout				
Socialist gain from Labour		Swing		

The by-election was called following the resignation of Cllr Houghton.

Evelyn by-election, 10 June 2004
Party	Candidate	Votes	%	±%
Labour	Heidi Alexander	1,432		
Conservative	Rebecca Stevens	463		
Socialist	Jessica Leech	374		
Liberal Democrats	David Edgerton	367		
Green	Robin Altwarg	199		
Turnout				
Labour hold		Swing		

The by-election was called following the resignation of Cllr Chater.

Lee Green by-election, 10 June 2004
Party	Candidate	Votes	%	±%
Labour	Simeon Baker	1,213		
Liberal Democrats	John Russell	1,156		
Conservative	Brian Chipps	903		
Independent	Gerard Ambrose	665		
Green	Anna Baker	394		
Turnout				
Labour gain from Liberal Democrats		Swing		

The by-election was called following the resignation of Cllr Collins.

Forest Hill by-election, 17 March 2005
Party	Candidate	Votes	%	±%
Liberal Democrats	Arthur Peake	1,011		
Labour	Erica Ballmann	789		
Conservative	Raymond Squires	522		
Turnout				
Liberal Democrats gain from Labour		Swing		

The by-election was called following the death of Cllr Dawson.

Lee Green by-election, 17 March 2005
Party	Candidate	Votes	%	±%
Liberal Democrats	Paul Bentley	939		
Conservative	Brian Chipps	642		
Labour	Ashtaq Arain	448		
Independent	Gerard Ambrose	355		
Green	Andrea Hughes	113		
UKIP	Ralph Atkinson	40		
Turnout				
Liberal Democrats gain from Labour		Swing		

The by-election was called following the resignation of Cllr Semple.

=== 2006–2010 ===
Whitefoot by-election, 13 September 2007
Party	Candidate	Votes	%	±%
Liberal Democrats	Pete Pattisson	986		
Labour	Skip Amrani	901		
Conservative	Thomas Philpott	536		
BNP	Tess Culnane	95		
UKIP	Jens Winton	89		
Green	Charles Laurie	52		
Turnout				
Liberal Democrats hold		Swing		

The by-election was called following the disqualification of Cllr Kentman.

Downham by-election, 19 February 2009
Party	Candidate	Votes	%	±%
Liberal Democrats	Jenni Clutten	1,075		
Liberal Democrats	Duwayne Brooks	1,067		
Labour	Damien Egan	655		
Conservative	Christine Allison	654		
Labour	Pauline Morrison	635		
Conservative	Andrew Lee	632		
BNP	Tess Culnane	287		
Green	Cath Miller	63		
Green	Lee Roach	62		
Turnout				
Liberal Democrats hold		Swing		
Liberal Democrats hold		Swing		

The by-election was called following the resignations of Cllrs Carter and Morris.

=== 2010–2014 ===
Ladywell by-election, 4 November 2010
Party	Candidate	Votes	%	±%
Labour	Carl Handley	1,231		
Green	Ute Michel	1,041		
Liberal Democrats	Ingrid Chetram	314		
People Before Profit	Helen Mercer	233		
Conservative	Ben Appleby	153		
Turnout			29.9%	
Labour hold		Swing		

The by-election was called following the resignation of Cllr Tim Shand.

Bellingham by-election, 24 March 2011
Party	Candidate	Votes	%	±%
Labour	Jacq Paschoud	1,100		
Conservative	Simon Nundy	340		
Liberal Democrats	Jenni Steele	334		
People Before Profit	Ian Page	264		
Green	Phil Laurie	100		
Turnout			22%	
Labour hold		Swing		

The by-election was called following the death of Cllr Ronald Stockbridge.

Whitefoot by-election, 11 October 2012
Party	Candidate	Votes	%	±%
Labour	Mark Ingleby	924		
Liberal Democrats	Janet Hurst	646		
Conservative	Simon Nundy	258		
People Before Profit	John Hamilton	241		
UKIP	David Kurten	182		
Green	Ute Michel	36		
Turnout			22.2%	
Labour gain from Liberal Democrats		Swing		

The by-election was called following the resignation of Cllr Pete Pattisson.

Evelyn by-election, 28 March 2013
Party	Candidate	Votes	%	±%
Labour	Olufunke Abidoye	978		
People Before Profit	Barbara Raymond	404		
Liberal Democrats	Bill Town	131		
Conservative	Simon Nundy	119		
UKIP	Paul Oakley	119		
Turnout			16.2%	
Labour hold		Swing		

The by-election was called following the resignation of Cllr Joseph Folorunso.

=== 2014–2018 ===
Bellingham by-election, 21 July 2016
Party	Candidate	Votes	%	±%
Labour	Sue Hordijenko	940	56.8	+2.8
Conservative	Ross Archer	302	18.2	+5.4
Liberal Democrats	Ed Veasey	180	10.9	−5.1
People Before Profit	David Hamilton	129	7.8	−5.6
UKIP	Edwin Smith	104	6.3	N/A
Turnout		1,657	16.3%	
Labour hold		Swing		

The by-election was called following the resignation of Cllr Ami Ibitson.

Brockley by-election, 13 October 2016
Party	Candidate	Votes	%	±%
Labour	Sophie McGeevor	1,190	48.0	+9.5
Green	Clare Phipps	631	25.4	−2.6
Liberal Democrats	Bobby Dean	259	10.4	+5.2
Conservative	Andrew Hughes	195	7.9	+0.6
Women's Equality	Rebecca Jones	173	7.0	+7.0
UKIP	Hugh Waine	33	1.3	−3.6
Majority		559	22.5	
Turnout		2,481		
Labour hold		Swing		

The by-election was called following the resignation of Cllr Alicia Kennedy.

Evelyn by-election, 13 October 2016
Party	Candidate	Votes	%	±%
Labour	Joyce Jacca	1,028	53.4	+0.0
People Before Profit	Ray Barron-Woolford	314	16.3	−1.7
Conservative	James Clark	183	9.5	+9.5
Independent	Scott Barkwith	173	9.0	+9.0
Green	Andrea Carey-Fuller	119	6.2	−8.9
Liberal Democrats	Lucy Salek	107	5.6	−3.3
Majority		714	37.1	
Turnout		1,924		
Labour hold		Swing		

The by-election was called following the death of Cllr Crada Onuegbu.

=== 2018–2022 ===
Evelyn by-election, 2 May 2019
Party	Candidate	Votes	%	±%
Labour	Lionel Openshaw	1,681		
Green	James Braun	702		
Conservative	Eleanor Reader-Moore	231		
Liberal Democrats	Bunmi Wajero	200		
People Before Profit	Joyce Jacca	151		
UKIP	Richard Day	140		
Women's Equality	Nicke Adebowale	71		
Democrats and Veterans	Matt Jenkins	13		
Labour hold		Swing		

The by-election was called following the resignation of Cllr Alex Feis-Bryce.

Whitefoot by-election 2019, 2 May 2019
Party	Candidate	Votes	%	±%
Labour	Kim Powell	1,314		
Liberal Democrats	Max Brockbank	514		
Conservative	Ben Blackmore	313		
People Before Profit	Gwenton Sloley	218		
CPA	Katherine Hortense	52		
Women's Equality	Cairis Grant-Hickey	41		
Democrats and Veterans	Massimo Dimambro	28		
Labour hold		Swing		

The by-election was called following the resignation of Cllr Janet Daby.

Bellingham by-election, 6 May 2021
Party	Candidate	Votes	%	±%
Labour Co-op	Rachel Onikosi	2,118	56.0	
Conservative	Dickon Prior	738	19.5	
Green	Nick Humerstone	336	8.9	
People Before Profit	John Hamilton	303	8.0	
Liberal Democrats	Alex Feakes	210	5.5	
CPA	Katherine Hortense	80	2.1	
Labour hold		Swing		

This by-election was called following the death of Cllr Sue Hordijenko.

Catford South by-election, 6 May 2021
Party	Candidate	Votes	%	±%
Labour Co-op	James Royston	2,473	50.7	
Liberal Democrats	Diana Cashin	891	18.3	
Conservative	Favour Obi	761	15.6	
Green	Matt Barker	590	12.0	
CPA	Maureen Martin	114	2.3	
Young People's	Richard Galloway	52	1.0	
Labour hold		Swing		

This by-election was called following the resignation of Cllr Skip Amrani.

New Cross by-election, 6 May 2021
Party	Candidate	Votes	%	±%
Labour	Samantha Latouche	3,038	61.1	
Green	Andrea Fuller	862	17.3	
Conservative	Chris Wilford	526	10.6	
People Before Profit	Gwenton Sloley	219	4.4	
Liberal Democrats	Bunmi Wajero	214	4.3	
TUSC	Andy Beadle	111	2.2	
Labour hold		Swing		

This by-election was held following the resignation of Cllr Joe Dromey.

Sydenham by-election, 6 May 2021
Party	Candidate	Votes	%	±%
Labour Co-op	Jack Lavery	2,634	51.3	
Conservative	Diana Cashin	982	19.1	
Green	Nick Lee	820	16.0	
Liberal Democrats	Margot Wilson	513	10.0	
People Before Profit	Michael Wayne	188	3.7	
Labour hold		Swing		

This by-election was called following the resignation of Cllr Tom Copley.

=== 2022–2026 ===
Deptford by-election, 9 November 2023
Party	Candidate	Votes	%	±%
Labour	Dawn Atkinson	1,596	71.2	+17.7
Green	Tim Crossley	382	17.0	−1.9
Conservative	Siama Qadar	174	7.8	−0.4
Liberal Democrats	Alan Harding	91	4.1	−2.7
Majority		1,214	54.1	
Turnout		2,243		
Labour hold		Swing		

The by-election was called following the resignation of Cllr Stephen Hayes.

Deptford by-election, 2 May 2024
Party	Candidate	Votes	%	±%
Labour	David Walker	2,642	66.1	−5.1
Green	Adam Pugh	944	23.6	+6.6
Liberal Democrats	Jean Branch	221	5.5	+1.4
Independent	Tan Bui	124	3.1	+3.1
Conservative	Hugh Rees-Beaumont	69	1.7	−6.1
Majority		1,698	42.5	−11.6
Turnout		4,000	36	
Labour hold		Swing	▼5.85	

The by-election was called following the resignation of Cllr Brenda Dacres, who had left the role due to being elected Mayor in a by-election.

Blackheath by-election, 4 July 2024
Party	Candidate	Votes	%	±%
Labour	Pauline Dall	2,959	43.8	+0.7
Green	Matt Barker	1,472	21.8	+6.8
Liberal Democrats	Chris Maines	1,360	20.1	−8.6
Conservative	Hugh Rees-Beaumont	970	14.3	+1.0
Majority		1,487	22.0	
Turnout		6,761		
Labour hold		Swing		

The by-election was called following the resignation of Cllr Juliet Campbell, who had left the role to run in the Broxtowe constituency.

=== 2026–2030 ===
Crofton Park by-election, 18 June 2026
Party	Candidate	Votes	%	±%
Green	Esther Lie	1,340	44.9	
Labour	Alex Brooks	1,330	44.5	
Reform	Paul Newman	127	4.3	
Liberal Democrats	Richard Elliott	106	3.5	
Conservative	Caitlin Pugh	73	2.4	
Independent	Roger Mighton	10	0.3	
Majority		10	0.3	
Turnout		2,986		
Green hold		Swing		

The by-election was called following the election of Cllr Liam Shrivastava as Mayor of Lewisham.

== Election results since 2022 ==
New boundaries were used for the 2022 election - however, Labour again won every seat.

	2022
Bellingham	Lab 2
Blackheath	Lab 3
Brockley	Lab 3
Catford South	Lab 3
Crofton Park	Lab 3
Deptford	Lab 3
Downham	Lab 3
Evelyn	Lab 3
Forest Hill	Lab 3
Grove Park	Lab 3
Hither Green	Lab 3
Ladywell	Lab 3
Lee Green	Lab 3
Lewisham Central	Lab 2
New Cross Gate	Lab 2
Perry Vale	Lab 3
Rushey Green	Lab 3
Sydenham	Lab 3
Telegraph Hill	Lab 3

== Election results 2002–2018 ==
In 2002 the council was reduced to its smallest size ever: 18 wards of 3 councillors each, plus an Elected Mayor, an innovation introduced by the Government two years earlier in the Local Government Act 2000. Incumbent Dave Sullivan who was combining the roles of Civic Mayor and Leader of the Council, in preparation for the introduction of the new system lost an acrimonious Labour Party internal primary to Steve Bullock, who went on to win the position. However, local policy difficulties as well as the problems the Labour Party was experiencing nationally meant that the 2006 election turned out to be only the second time that Labour did not win a majority of councillors. In 2014, with an unpopular coalition government in national office, Labour regained almost all seats on the council, with the only opposition being a single Green. In 2018 Labour won every seat for the first time.

	2002	2006	2010	2014	2018
Bellingham	Lab 3	Lab 3	Lab 3	Lab 3	Lab 3
Blackheath	Lab 3	Lib Dem 3	Lib Dem 2 / Lab 1	Lab 3	Lab 3
Brockley	Lab 2 / Green 1	Green 3	Lab 2 / Green 1	Lab 2 / Green 1	Lab 3
Catford South	Lab 3	Lab 3	Lab 3	Lab 3	Lab 3
Crofton Park	Lab 3	Lab 3	Lab 2 / Lib Dem 1	Lab 3	Lab 3
Downham	Lib Dem 2 / Lab 1	Lib Dem 3	Lib Dem 3	Lab 3	Lab 3
Evelyn	Lab 3	Lab 3	Lab 3	Lab 3	Lab 3
Forest Hill	Lab 3	Lib Dem 3	Lib Dem 2 / Lab 1	Lab 3	Lab 3
Grove Park	Con 2 / Lab 1	Con 3	Con 2 / Lab 1	Lab 3	Lab 3
Ladywell	Lab 3	Green 3	Lab 3	Lab 3	Lab 3
Lee Green	Lab 3	Lib Dem 3	Lib Dem 2 / Lab 1	Lab 3	Lab 3
Lewisham Central	Lab 3	Lib Dem 2 / Lab 1	Lab 3	Lab 3	Lab 3
New Cross	Lab 3	Lab 3	Lab 3	Lab 3	Lab 3
Perry Vale	Lab 3	Lab 3	Lab 3	Lab 3	Lab 3
Rushey Green	Lab 3	Lab 3	Lab 3	Lab 3	Lab 3
Sydenham	Lab 3	Lab 3	Lab 3	Lab 3	Lab 3
Telegraph Hill	Lab 1 / LEAP 1 / Soc 1	Soc 2 / Lab 1	Lab 3	Lab 3	Lab 3
Whitefoot	Lib Dem 2 / Lab 1	Lib Dem 3	Lib Dem 2 / Lab 1	Lab 3	Lab 3

2018 Council:
Labour 54*

2014 Council:
Labour 53*; Green 1

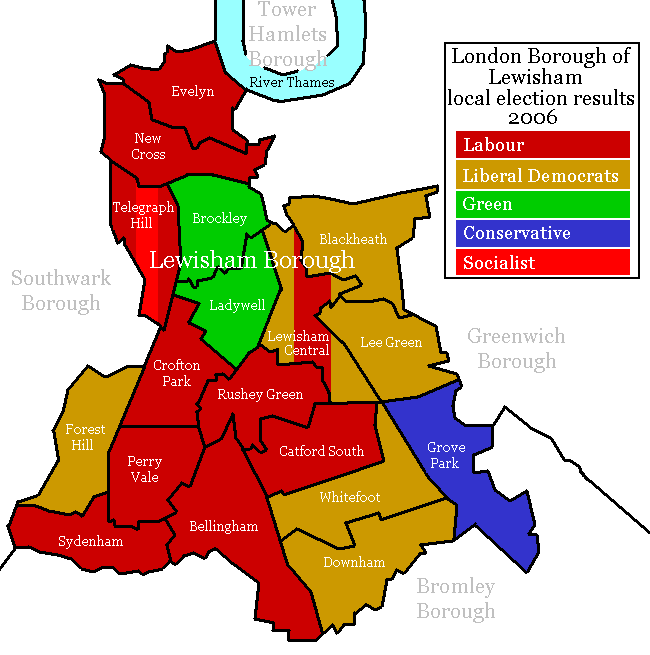
Map showing the borders of the 18 wards of the London Borough of Lewisham, coloured to show the results of the 2006 local election results

2010 Council:
Labour 40*; Liberal Democrats 12; Green 1; Conservative 2

2006 Council:
Labour 27*; Liberal Democrats 17; Green 6; Conservative 3; Socialist 2

2002 Council:
Labour 46*; Liberal Democrats 4; Conservative 2; Socialist 1; Green 1; Local Education Action for Parents (LEAP) 1

*including Elected Mayor

=== By-elections in the 2002 council ===
(winning party shown)

17 March 2005 – Forest Hill (Lib Dem)
17 March 2005 – Lee Green (Lib Dem)
10 June 2004 – Evelyn (Labour)
10 June 2004 – Lee Green (Labour)
4 December 2003 – Telegraph Hill (Socialist)
23 October 2003 – Lewisham Central (Lib Dem) [All postal ballot]
7 November 2002 – Downham (Lib Dem)
10 October 2002 – Lee Green (Lib Dem)

=== By-elections in the 2006 council ===
(winning party shown)

13 September 2007 – Whitefoot (Lib Dem)
19 February 2009 – 2x Downham (2x Lib Dem)

== Election results 1978–1998 ==
In 1978 the council was increased to 67 seats as the ward boundaries were reviewed and changed. Also, the Government changed the law to extend Council terms everywhere from three to four years, so the 1974 council was given an extra year of life.

	1978	1982	1986	1990	1994	1998
Bellingham	Lab 2	Lab 2	Lab 2	Lab 2	Lab 2	Lab 2
Blackheath	Lab 2	Con 2	Lab 2	Lab 2	Lab 2	Lab 2
Blythe Hill	Con 2	Con 2	Lab 2	Lab 2	Lab 2	Lab 2
Catford	Con 2	Con 2	Con 2	Con 2	Lab 2	Lab 2
Churchdown	Lab 3	Lab 3	Lab 3	Lab 3	Lab 3	Lab 3
Crofton Park	Con 3	Con 3	Lab 3	Lab 3	Lab 3	Lab 3
Downham	Lab 3	Lab 3	Lab 3	Lib Dem 3	Lib Dem 3	Lib Dem 3
Drake	Lab 3	Lab 3	Lab 3	Lab 3	Lab 3	Lab 3
Evelyn	Lab 3	Lab 3	Lab 3	Lab 3	Lab 3	Lab 3
Forest Hill	Lab 2	Lab 2	Lab 2	Lab 2	Lab 2	Lab 2
Grinling Gibbons	Lab 3	Lab 3	Lab 3	Lab 3	Lab 3	Lab 3
Grove Park	1 Lab / 1 Con	Lab 2	1 Lab / 1 Con	Lab 2	Lab 2	Lab 2
Hither Green	Lab 3	Lab 3	Lab 3	Lab 3	Lab 3	Lab 3
Horniman	Con 3	Con 3	Con 3	Lab 2 / Con 1	Lab 3	Lab 3
Ladywell	Lab 3	Lab 3	Lab 3	Lab 3	Lab 3	Lab 3
Manor Lee	Lab 2	Lab 2	Lab 2	Lab 2	Lab 2	Lab 2
Marlowe	Lab 3	Lab 3	Lab 3	Lab 3	Lab 3	Lab 3
Pepys	Lab 3	Lab 3	Lab 3	Lab 3	Lab 3	Lab 3
Perry Hill	Con 3	Lab 3	Con 3	Lab 3	Lab 3	Lab 3
Rushey Green	Lab 2	Lab 2	Lab 2	Lab 2	Lab 2	Lab 2
St Andrews	Con 2	Con 2	Con 2	Lab 2	Lab 2	Lab 2
St Margaret	1 Lab / 1 Con	Con 2	1 Lab / 1 Con	Lab 2	Lab 2	Lab 2
St Mildred	Con 3	Con 3	Con 3	Con 3	2 Lab / 1 Con	2 Con / 1 Lab
Sydenham East	Lab 3	Lab 3	Lab 3	Lab 3	Lab 3	Lab 3
Sydenham West	Con 3	Con 3	2 Lab / 1 Con	Lab 3	Lab 3	Lab 3
Whitefoot	Lab 2	Con 2	1 Lab / 1 Con	Lab 2	Lab 2	1 Lab / 1 Lib Dem

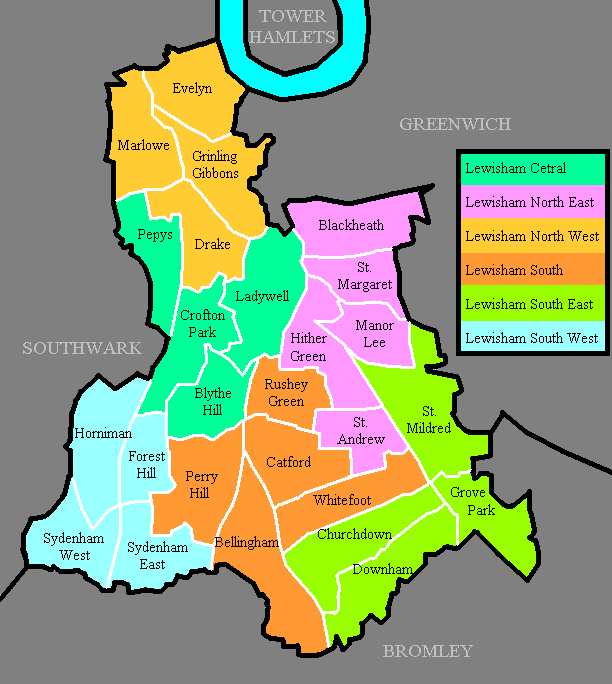
Wards used in the London Borough of Lewisham from 1978 to 1998

1998 Council:
Labour 61; Lib Dem 4; Conservative 2

1994 Council:
Labour 63; Lib Dem 3; Conservative 1

1990 Council:
Labour 58; Conservative 6; Lib Dem 3

1986 Council:
Labour 50; Conservative 17

1982 Council:
Labour 43; Conservative 24

1978 Council:
Labour 44; Conservative 23

=== By-elections in the 1998 council ===
(winning party shown)
8 November 2001 – Bellingham (Labour)
8 February 2001 – Marlowe (Labour)
23 November 2000 – Pepys (Socialist)
15 July 1999 – Churchdown (Labour)
10 June 1999 – Pepys (Socialist)
8 April 1999 – Downham (Lib Dem)
25 November 1998 – Grinling Gibbons (Labour)

== Election results 1964–1974 ==
Between 1964 and 1974 the council was elected on wards created before the borough was created: 18 councillors in 6 wards from the Metropolitan Borough of Deptford and 42 councillors in 17 wards from the Metropolitan Borough of Lewisham. The election of the first council in 1964 constituted the practical creation of the London Borough of Lewisham. It operated in 'shadow' form and did not take over administration of services until a year later. Whilst the term of a council at that time was three years, the Government extended the life of all the London Boroughs in order to de-synchronize the timetabling of elections with those of the Greater London Council.

However, the 1968 council elections were a disaster for the Labour Party who were in national government at the time, and this was reflected in this borough – the three-year period 1968–1971 remains the only time in the borough's existence that Labour has not formed the administration. Non-Labour governance didn't take – the 1971 election saw the Conservative Party unable to defend its gains, as – now in national government itself – it was crushed in turn.

	1964	1968	1971	1974
Area of the former Metropolitan Borough of Deptford
Brockley	Lab 3	Con 3	Lab 3	Lab 3
Deptford	Lab 3	Lab 3	Lab 3	Lab 3
Drake	Lab 3	Con 3	Lab 3	Lab 3
Grinling Gibbons	Lab 3	Lab 3	Lab 3	Lab 3
Marlowe	Lab 3	Lab 3	Lab 3	Lab 3
Pepys	Lab 3	Con 3	Lab 3	Lab 3
Area of the former Metropolitan Borough of Lewisham
Bellingham	Lab 2	Lab 2	Lab 2	Lab 2
Blackheath and Lewisham Village	Con 3	Con 3	Lab 3	Lab 3
Culverley	Con 2	Con 2	Con 2	Con 2
Forest Hill	Lab 2 / Con 1	Con 3	Lab 3	Con 3
Honor Oak Park	Con 3	Con 3	Lab 3	Con 3
Grove Park	Lab 2	Lab 2	Lab 2	Lab 2
Ladywell	Lab 3	Con 3	Lab 3	Lab 3
Lewisham Park	Lab 3	Con 3	Lab 3	Lab 3
Manor Lee	Lab 2	Con 2	Lab 2	Lab 2
Rushey Green	Lab 2	Con 2	Lab 2	Lab 2
St Andrew	Lab 2	Con 2	Lab 2	Lab 2
St Mildred Lee	Con 2	Con 2	Con 2	Con 2
Southend	Lab 3	Lab 3	Lab 3	Lab 3
South Lee	Lab 2	Con 2	Lab 2	Lab 2
Sydenham East	Lab 2 / Con 1	Con 3	Lab 3	Lab 3
Sydenham West	Con 3	Con 3	Lab 3	Lab 2 / Con 1
Whitefoot	Lab 2	Con 2	Lab 2	Lab 2

1974 Council:
Labour 49; Conservative 11

1971 Council:
Labour 55; Conservative 5

1968 Council:
Conservative 41; Labour 19

1964 Council:
Labour 45; Conservative 15
