= 2022 Lewisham London Borough Council election =

2022 local election in Lewisham

2022 Lewisham Council election
- 5 May 2022

All 54 council seats
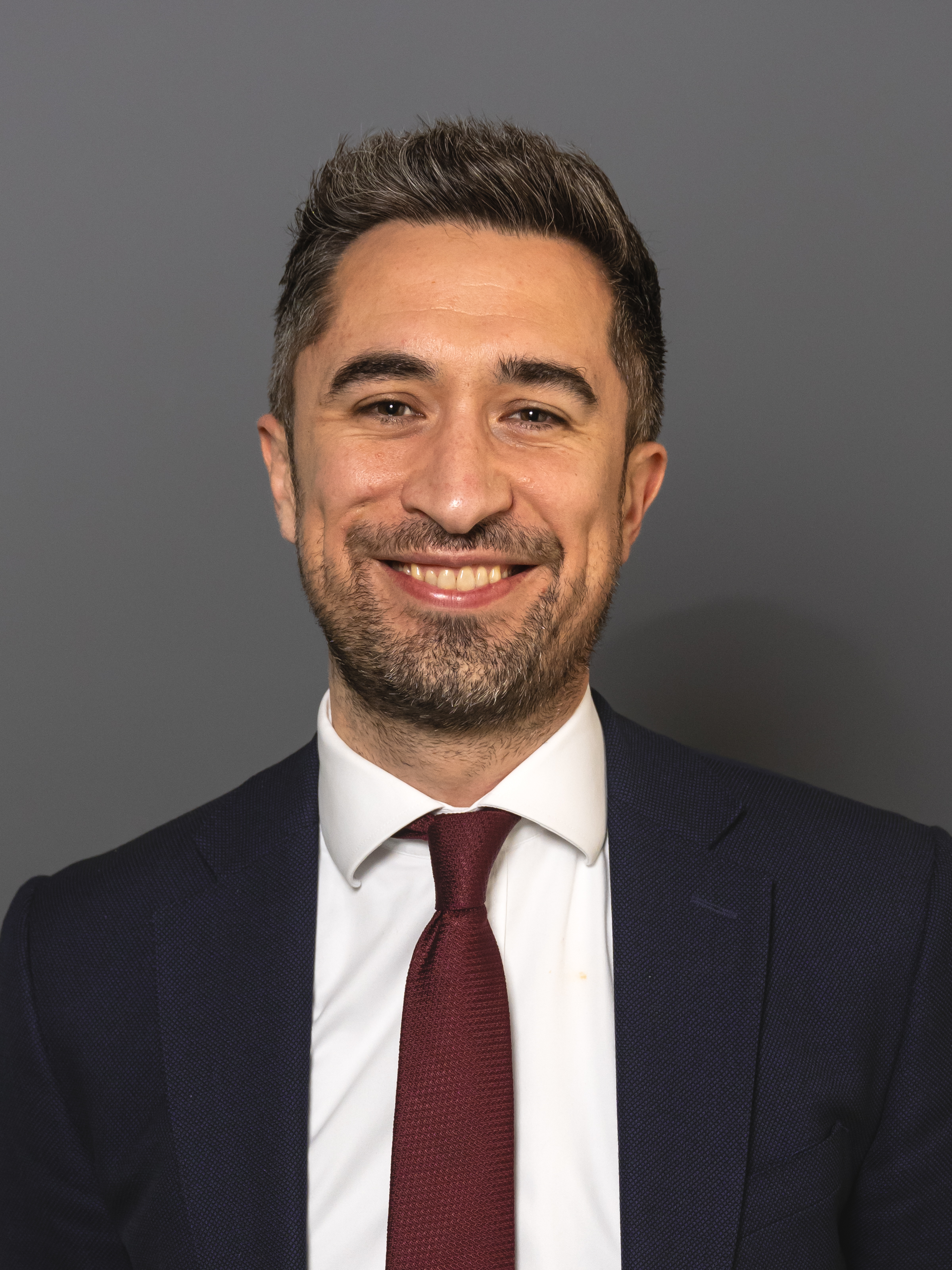
	First party	Second party
Leader	Damien Egan
Party	Labour	Green
Last election	54 seats, 60.2%	0 seats, 11.6%
Seats won	54	0
Seat change	Steady	Steady
Popular vote	102,522	36,760
Percentage	55.4%	19.9%
Swing	▼4.8%	▲8.3%
- Map of the results
council control before election
Labour
Subsequent council control
Labour Party (UK)

The 2022 Lewisham London Borough Council election took place on 5 May 2022. All 54 members of Lewisham London Borough Council were up for election. The elections took place alongside local elections in the other London boroughs and elections to local authorities across the United Kingdom.

The Labour Party maintained its control of the council, winning all 54 seats, mirroring its landslide victory in the 2018 election. The 2022 election took place under revised election boundaries, with the number of councillors remaining the same. The election coincided with an election for the Mayor of Lewisham, which was won by the incumbent Damien Egan of the Labour Party.

As of June 2025, two Green Party councillors make up the official opposition on Lewisham Council. This is the first time Lewisham Council has had an opposition group since 2010.

== Background ==
=== History ===
Result of the 2018 borough election

The thirty-two London boroughs were established in 1965 by the London Government Act 1963. They are the principal authorities in Greater London and have responsibilities including education, housing, planning, highways, social services, libraries, recreation, waste, environmental health and revenue collection. Some of the powers are shared with the Greater London Authority, which also manages passenger transport, police and fire.

Since its formation, Lewisham has generally had a Labour majority. The only exceptions have been the period between 1968 and 1971 when the Conservatives controlled the council and a period of no overall control from 2006 to 2010 (though under the mayoral system Labour still formed the administration). Labour regained control of the council in the 2010 election, winning 39 seats to the Liberal Democrats' twelve seats. The Conservatives won two seats and the Green Party won one seat. Labour extended its majority in the 2014 election, winning 53 seats with a single Green councillor being elected. In the most recent council election in 2018, Labour won all fifty-four seats to the council with 60.2% of the vote across the borough. The Conservatives received 13.9% of the vote, the Liberal Democrats received 12.0% of the vote and the Green Party received 11.6% of the vote, but none won any seats. The Labour candidate Damien Egan became mayor of Lewisham in the concurrent mayoral election.

=== Council term ===
In 2019, a Labour councillor for Evelyn, Alex Feis Bryce, resigned due to work commitments. At the same time, a Labour councillor for Whitefoot, Janet Daby, resigned after winning the 2018 Lewisham East by-election. Labour held both seats, with Lionel Openshaw winning in Evelyn and Kim Powell winning in Whitefoot. Alan Smith, a Labour councillor for Catford South, left his party to sit as an independent in June 2019 in protest against the leadership of Jeremy Corbyn.

Tom Copley, a councillor for Sydenham, resigned after being appointed as a deputy mayor by Sadiq Khan in early 2020. Skip Amrani, a Labour councillor for Catford South, resigned in March 2020 due to family commitments. Joe Dromey, a councillor for New Cross, resigned in January 2020 due to taking on a politically restricted job. Sue Hordijenko, a Labour councillor for Bellingham ward, died in February 2021. Due to the COVID-19 pandemic, all four by-elections were held on 6 May 2021 alongside the 2021 London mayoral election and London Assembly election. Labour held all four seats. Bellingham was won by Rachel Onikosi. Catford South was won by James Royston, who worked for an animal welfare charity. New Cross was won by Samantha Latouche and Sydenham was won by Jack Lavery.

As with most London boroughs, Lewisham elected its councillors under new boundaries decided by the Local Government Boundary Commission for England, which it produced after a period of consultation. The number of councillors has remained at 54, under new boundaries with sixteen three-councillor wards and two two-councillor wards.

== Electoral process ==
Lewisham, like other London borough councils, elects all of its councillors at once every four years. The previous election took place in 2018. The 2022 election took place by multi-member first-past-the-post voting, with each ward being represented by two or three councillors. Electors had as many votes as there are councillors to be elected in their ward, with the top two or three being elected.

All registered electors (British, Irish, Commonwealth and European Union citizens) living in London aged 18 or over were entitled to vote in the election. People who live at two addresses in different councils, such as university students with different term-time and holiday addresses, were entitled to be registered for and vote in elections in both local authorities. Voting in-person at polling stations took place from 7:00 to 22:00 on election day, and voters were able to apply for postal votes or proxy votes in advance of the election.

== Previous council composition ==
Council composition after the 2018 election

Council composition ahead of the 2022 election

After 2018 election		Before 2022 election	
Party	Seats	Party	Seats
Labour	54	Labour	53
		Independent	1

== Campaign ==
The incumbent mayor Damien Egan was re-selected by the Labour Party, with 81% of members voting for him to remain as their candidate in 2022.

== Results summary ==
2022 Lewisham London Borough Council election
Party	Seats	Gains	Losses	Net gain/loss	Seats %	Votes %	Votes	+/−
Labour	54	0	0	Steady	100.0	55.4	102,522	-4.8
Green	0	0	0	Steady	0.0	19.9	36,760	+8.3
Liberal Democrats	0	0	0	Steady	0.0	13.0	24,050	+1.0
Conservative	0	0	0	Steady	0.0	11.0	20,320	-2.9
TUSC	0	0	0	Steady	0.0	0.3	525	±0.0
Independent	0	0	0	Steady	0.0	0.3	501	+0.1
CPA	0	0	0	Steady	0.0	0.1	189	±0.0
Shared Ground	0	0	0	Steady	0.0	0.0	47	N/A

== Ward results ==
Bellingham (2)
Party	Candidate	Votes	%	±%
Labour	Rachel Onikosi	1,209	80.4	
Labour	Jacq Paschoud*	925	61.5	
Conservative	Craig Barrett	270	18.0	
Liberal Democrats	Sarah Morris	199	13.2	
Liberal Democrats	Ryan McMichael	160	10.6	
Conservative	Paul Treaddell	149	9.9	
CPA	Katherine Hortense	94	6.3	
Turnout			23.2	
Labour hold		Swing		
Labour hold		Swing		

Blackheath (3)
Party	Candidate	Votes	%	±%
Labour	Juliet Campbell*	2,035	48.3	
Labour	Amanda de Ryk*	1,884	44.7	
Labour	Luke Warner	1,565	37.2	
Liberal Democrats	Chris Maines	1,356	32.2	
Liberal Democrats	Ben Maguire	1,211	28.7	
Liberal Democrats	Helen Steel	1,202	28.5	
Green	Matt Barker	708	16.8	
Green	Anne Caron-Delion	696	16.5	
Conservative	Caroline Attfield	627	14.9	
Green	John Wood	467	11.1	
Conservative	Nicola Peers	451	10.7	
Conservative	Ian Bentinck	435	10.3	
Turnout			38.7	
Labour hold		Swing		
Labour hold		Swing		
Labour hold		Swing		

Brockley (3)
Party	Candidate	Votes	%	±%
Labour	Sian Eiles	2,478	62.4	
Labour	Ayesha Lahai-Taylor	2,276	57.4	
Labour	Stephen Penfold*	1,937	48.8	
Green	Deborah Le'Cand-Hardwood	1,153	29.1	
Green	Peter ap Seisyllt	1,041	26.2	
Green	Mike Keogh	1,025	25.8	
Liberal Democrats	Richard Elliott	346	8.7	
Liberal Democrats	Karen Pratt	283	7.1	
Conservative	Ulric Almqvist	267	6.7	
Liberal Democrats	Mark Morris	257	6.5	
Conservative	Julie Killip	254	6.4	
Conservative	John-Joe O'Connor	221	5.6	
Independent	Ray Barron-Woolford	154	3.9	
Independent	Toni-Ann Gurdon	125	3.1	
Independent	Stewart Lendor	88	2.2	
Turnout			34.4	
Labour hold		Swing		
Labour hold		Swing		
Labour hold		Swing		

Catford South (3)
Party	Candidate	Votes	%	±%
Labour	Natasha Burgess	2,119	59.9	
Labour	Eva Stamirowski*	1,648	46.6	
Labour	James Royston	1,632	46.2	
Liberal Democrats	Diana Cashin	1,104	31.2	
Liberal Democrats	Kate Richardson	960	27.2	
Liberal Democrats	Bunmi Wajero	731	20.7	
Conservative	Thomas Adkin	532	15.0	
Conservative	Mario Bucolo	425	12.0	
Conservative	Benjamin Loughnane	399	11.3	
Green	Rona Radenhurst	352	10.0	
Green	Malcolm Furneaux	332	9.4	
Green	James Newton	324	9.2	
Shared Ground	Richard Galloway	47	1.3	
Turnout			32.2	
Labour hold		Swing		
Labour hold		Swing		
Labour hold		Swing		

Crofton Park (3)
Party	Candidate	Votes	%	±%
Labour	Tauseef Anwar*	2,457	57.5	
Labour	Chris Barnham*	2,411	56.4	
Labour	Carol Webley-Brown	2,147	50.2	
Green	Anna-Maria Cahalane	1,649	38.6	
Green	Alison Pick	1,148	26.9	
Green	John Keidan	933	21.8	
Liberal Democrats	Cheryl Baum	554	13.0	
Conservative	Paul Black	349	8.2	
Liberal Democrats	Stephen Locke	331	7.7	
Conservative	Jonathan Lee	319	7.5	
Conservative	Oliver Patey	286	6.7	
Liberal Democrats	Andrew McIlwraith	240	5.6	
Turnout			41.2	
Labour hold		Swing		
Labour hold		Swing		
Labour hold		Swing		

Deptford (3)
Party	Candidate	Votes	%	±%
Labour	Brenda Dacres*	2,095	68.6	
Labour	Rosie Parry	1,791	58.7	
Labour	Stephen Hayes	1,632	53.5	
Green	Upul Dissanayake	742	24.3	
Green	Sue Gore	729	23.9	
Conservative	Flora Coleman	323	10.6	
TUSC	Andy Beadle	275	9.0	
Liberal Democrats	Janet Hurst	267	8.7	
Liberal Democrats	David Barnes	241	7.9	
Independent	Nik Baksi	214	7.0	
Conservative	Huw Shooter	213	7.0	
Conservative	Adam Thomas	196	6.4	
Liberal Democrats	Mike Steele	151	4.9	
Independent	Jasmine Fulcher	107	3.5	
Independent	Barbara Raymond	103	3.4	
Independent	Clarris Christopher	77	2.5	
Turnout			29.7	
Labour win (new seat)				
Labour win (new seat)				
Labour win (new seat)				

Downham (3)
Party	Candidate	Votes	%	±%
Labour	Andre Bourne*	1,679	60.2	
Labour	Coral Howard*	1,621	58.1	
Labour	Oana Olaru	1,442	51.7	
Conservative	Kwame Asabere	713	25.6	
Conservative	Chris Wilford	546	19.6	
Conservative	Junior Leachman	510	18.3	
Green	Sue Luxton	398	14.3	
Liberal Democrats	Danny Dignan	335	12.0	
Green	Emily Woodhouse	309	11.1	
Green	Inke Schreiber	281	10.1	
Liberal Democrats	Joan Labrom	279	10.0	
Liberal Democrats	Mike Patel	251	9.0	
Turnout			25.4	
Labour hold		Swing		
Labour hold		Swing		
Labour hold		Swing		

Evelyn (3)
Party	Candidate	Votes	%	±%
Labour	Will Cooper	1,524	67.3	
Labour	Rudi Schmidt	1,233	54.4	
Labour	Hau-Yu Tam	1,224	54.0	
Green	James Braun	523	23.1	
Green	Keith Chambers	426	18.8	
Green	Julian Himmerich	401	17.7	
Conservative	Karen Lowe	269	11.9	
Conservative	Yan Jiang	255	11.3	
Liberal Democrats	Jem Smith	240	10.6	
Liberal Democrats	Dan Fox-Evans	239	10.5	
Conservative	Tim Reczek	190	8.4	
Liberal Democrats	Peter Wells	156	6.9	
TUSC	Steve Rumney	118	5.2	
Turnout			26.9	
Labour hold		Swing		
Labour hold		Swing		
Labour hold		Swing		

Forest Hill (3)
Party	Candidate	Votes	%	±%
Labour	Sophie Davis*	2,395	61.4	
Labour	Peter Bernards*	2,044	52.4	
Labour	Billy Harding	1,797	46.1	
Green	Julia Rendall	1,156	29.6	
Green	Martin Cox	840	21.5	
Green	Mike Peters	757	19.4	
Liberal Democrats	Mark Bennett	535	13.7	
Liberal Democrats	John Russell	496	12.7	
Conservative	Anthony Bays	480	12.3	
Liberal Democrats	Krish Brown	458	11.7	
Conservative	Aimee Henderson	401	10.3	
Conservative	Paul Mahoney	340	8.7	
Turnout			35.4	
Labour hold		Swing		
Labour hold		Swing		
Labour hold		Swing		

Grove Park (3)
Party	Candidate	Votes	%	±%
Labour	Suzannah Clarke*	1,750	58.7	
Labour	Hilary Moore*	1,502	50.4	
Labour	Mark Jackson	1,464	49.1	
Conservative	Helena Croft	935	31.4	
Conservative	Favour Obi	694	23.3	
Conservative	Sergiy Lesyk	676	22.7	
Green	Angela Minto	617	20.7	
Liberal Democrats	Annie Kirby	533	17.9	
Green	Michael Thompson	425	14.3	
Liberal Democrats	Martin Passande	343	11.5	
Turnout			31.0	
Labour hold		Swing		
Labour hold		Swing		
Labour hold		Swing		

Hither Green (3)
Party	Candidate	Votes	%	±%
Labour	Yemisi Anifowose	2,537	65.5	
Labour	Kim Powell*	2,230	57.6	
Labour	Mark Ingleby*	2,125	54.9	
Green	Corin Ashwell	833	21.5	
Green	Dami Crossley	809	20.9	
Liberal Democrats	Jane Alaszewska	691	17.8	
Liberal Democrats	Julian Hawkins	534	13.8	
Conservative	Jonathan Crozier	521	13.4	
Liberal Democrats	Godfried Gyechie	470	12.1	
Conservative	Shane Hughes	451	11.6	
Conservative	Greg Stevens	420	10.8	
Turnout			32.2	
Labour win (new seat)				
Labour win (new seat)				
Labour win (new seat)				

Ladywell (3)
Party	Candidate	Votes	%	±%
Labour	Laura Cunningham	2,151	50.5	
Labour	Liz-Johnston-Franklin*	1,950	45.7	
Labour	Bill Brown*	1,930	45.3	
Green	Dorothy Stein	1,810	42.5	
Green	Nick Humberstone	1,786	41.9	
Green	Tim Crossley	1,759	41.3	
Liberal Democrats	Jean Burnell	322	7.6	
Conservative	Ian Harris	277	6.5	
Conservative	Maria-Lidia McInnes	267	6.3	
Conservative	Neil Weatherall	231	5.4	
Liberal Democrats	Tony Lloyd	165	3.9	
Liberal Democrats	Andy Smith	140	3.3	
Turnout			42.2	
Labour hold		Swing		
Labour hold		Swing		
Labour hold		Swing		

Lee Green (3)
Party	Candidate	Votes	%	±%
Labour	Ese Erheriene	1,970	48.1	
Labour	Eva Kestner	1,796	43.9	
Labour	James Rathbone*	1,672	40.9	
Liberal Democrats	Lizzie Fox	1,267	31.0	
Liberal Democrats	James Foulkes	1,090	26.6	
Liberal Democrats	Paul Olding	862	21.1	
Green	Imogen Solly	714	17.5	
Green	Miki Jablkowska	687	16.8	
Green	Richard Freestow	679	16.6	
Conservative	Teresa Bentinck	603	14.7	
Conservative	Helen Rowley	448	10.9	
Conservative	Sam Thurgood	392	9.6	
CPA	Maureen Martin	95	2.3	
Turnout			42.2	
Labour hold		Swing		
Labour hold		Swing		
Labour hold		Swing		

Lewisham Central (2)
Party	Candidate	Votes	%	±%
Labour	Edison Huynh	876	62.5	
Labour	Aliya Sheikh	791	56.4	
Green	Mia Spencer	455	32.4	
Liberal Democrats	Josh Curtis-Hale	190	13.5	
Conservative	Julie Marionneau	181	12.9	
Liberal Democrats	Peter George	180	12.8	
Conservative	Joshua O'Connor	132	9.4	
Turnout			29.4	
Labour hold		Swing		
Labour hold		Swing		

New Cross Gate (2)
Party	Candidate	Votes	%	±%
Labour	Aisha Malik-Smith	1,410	82.4	
Labour	Liam Shrivastava	890	52.0	
Green	Hudson Rolfe	473	27.6	
Conservative	Alexander Gill	166	9.7	
Liberal Democrats	Linda Hawkins	165	9.6	
TUSC	Jay Coward	132	7.7	
Conservative	Wendy Statham	100	5.8	
Liberal Democrats	Richard Hebditch	86	5.0	
Turnout			29.3	
Labour win (new seat)				
Labour win (new seat)				

Perry Vale (3)
Party	Candidate	Votes	%	±%
Labour	Sakina Sheikh*	2,680	61.6	
Labour	Susan Wise*	2,605	59.9	
Labour	John Paschoud*	2,596	59.7	
Green	Adela Pickles	1,193	27.4	
Green	Robert McIntosh	1,161	26.7	
Liberal Democrats	Alex Feakes	638	14.7	
Conservative	William Stevenson	495	11.4	
Conservative	Bettina Skeen	463	10.6	
Liberal Democrats	Alan Harding	449	10.3	
Conservative	Peter Thurgood	438	10.1	
Liberal Democrats	Alan Muhammed	329	7.6	
Turnout			36.6	
Labour hold		Swing		
Labour hold		Swing		
Labour hold		Swing		

Rushey Green (3)
Party	Candidate	Votes	%	±%
Labour	Louise Krupski*	2,421	67.0	
Labour	John Muldoon*	2,028	56.1	
Labour	James-J Walsh*	1,877	51.9	
Green	Allie Albion	851	23.5	
Green	Florence Murphy	851	23.5	
Green	Alex Cottrell	704	19.5	
Liberal Democrats	Heidi Degen	401	11.1	
Conservative	Felicity Benson	395	10.9	
Conservative	Selina Begum	389	10.8	
Conservative	Frances Thurgood	341	9.4	
Liberal Democrats	George Crozier	311	8.6	
Liberal Democrats	Adrien Smith	278	7.7	
Turnout			32.2	
Labour hold		Swing		
Labour hold		Swing		
Labour hold		Swing		

Sydenham (3)
Party	Candidate	Votes	%	±%
Labour	Chris Best*	2,456	63.2	
Labour	Liam Curran*	2,132	54.9	
Labour	Jack Lavery	2,026	52.2	
Green	Sue Austin	1,267	32.6	
Green	Nick Lee	858	22.1	
Conservative	Ross Archer	625	16.1	
Liberal Democrats	Michael Bachmann	534	13.8	
Liberal Democrats	Margot Wilson	495	12.7	
Conservative	Dickon Prior	475	12.2	
Conservative	Raymond Squires	446	11.5	
Liberal Democrats	Adam Bull	336	8.7	
Turnout			34.8	
Labour hold		Swing		
Labour hold		Swing		
Labour hold		Swing		

Telegraph Hill (3)
Party	Candidate	Votes	%	±%
Labour	Joan Millbank*	2,777	76.5	
Labour	Paul Bell*	2,541	70.0	
Labour	Luke Sorba*	2,139	58.9	
Green	Sarah Carter	1,448	39.9	
Green	Gabriel Krenzer	990	27.3	
Liberal Democrats	Averil Leimon	366	10.1	
Liberal Democrats	Kit Lloyd	293	8.1	
Conservative	Brendan Almqvist	153	4.2	
Conservative	Isaac Sackey	94	2.6	
Conservative	Anne Yeboah-Sackey	92	2.5	
Turnout			34.7	
Labour hold		Swing		
Labour hold		Swing		
Labour hold		Swing		

== Post election changes ==
Deptford by-election, 9 November 2023
Party	Candidate	Votes	%	±%
Labour	Dawn Atkinson	1,596	71.2	▲17.7
Green	Tim Crossley	382	17.0	▲1.9
Conservative	Siama Qadar	174	7.8	▼0.4
Liberal Democrats	Alan Harding	91	4.1	▼2.7
Majority		1,214	54.1	
Turnout		2,243		
Labour hold		Swing		

The by-election was called following the resignation of Councillor Stephen Hayes.

Deptford by-election, 2 May 2024
Party	Candidate	Votes	%	±%
Labour	David Walker	2,642	66.1	▼5.1
Green	Adam Pugh	944	23.6	▲6.6
Liberal Democrats	Jean Branch	221	5.5	▲1.4
Independent	Tan Bui	124	3.1	N/A
Conservative	Hugh Rees-Beaumont	69	1.7	▼6.1
Turnout		4,000	36.04	
Labour hold				

The Deptford by-election was triggered by the previous Labour councillor Brenda Dacres winning the borough-wide Mayor of Lewisham election; on becoming mayor, she was disqualified from also being a councillor.

2024 Blackheath by-election
Party	Candidate	Votes	%	±%
Labour	Pauline Dall	2,959	43.8	▼4.5
Green	Matt Barker	1,472	21.8	▲5.0
Liberal Democrats	Chris Maines	1,360	20.1	▼12.1
Conservative	Hugh Rees-Beaumont	970	14.3	▼0.3
Turnout		6,761		
Labour hold		Swing		

Two councillors defected from Labour to the Green Party in 2025. Two more Labour councillors defected to the Greens in 2026.
