= Baroness Kennedy =

Baroness Kennedy may refer to:

- Alicia Kennedy, Baroness Kennedy of Cradley (born 1969), British Labour politician
- Helena Kennedy, Baroness Kennedy of The Shaws (born 1950), Scottish barrister, broadcaster and Labour politician

== See also ==
- Lord Kennedy (disambiguation)
