= Roy Kennedy, Baron Kennedy of Southwark =

British politician and life peer (born 1962)

The Right Honourable The Lord Kennedy of Southwark PC
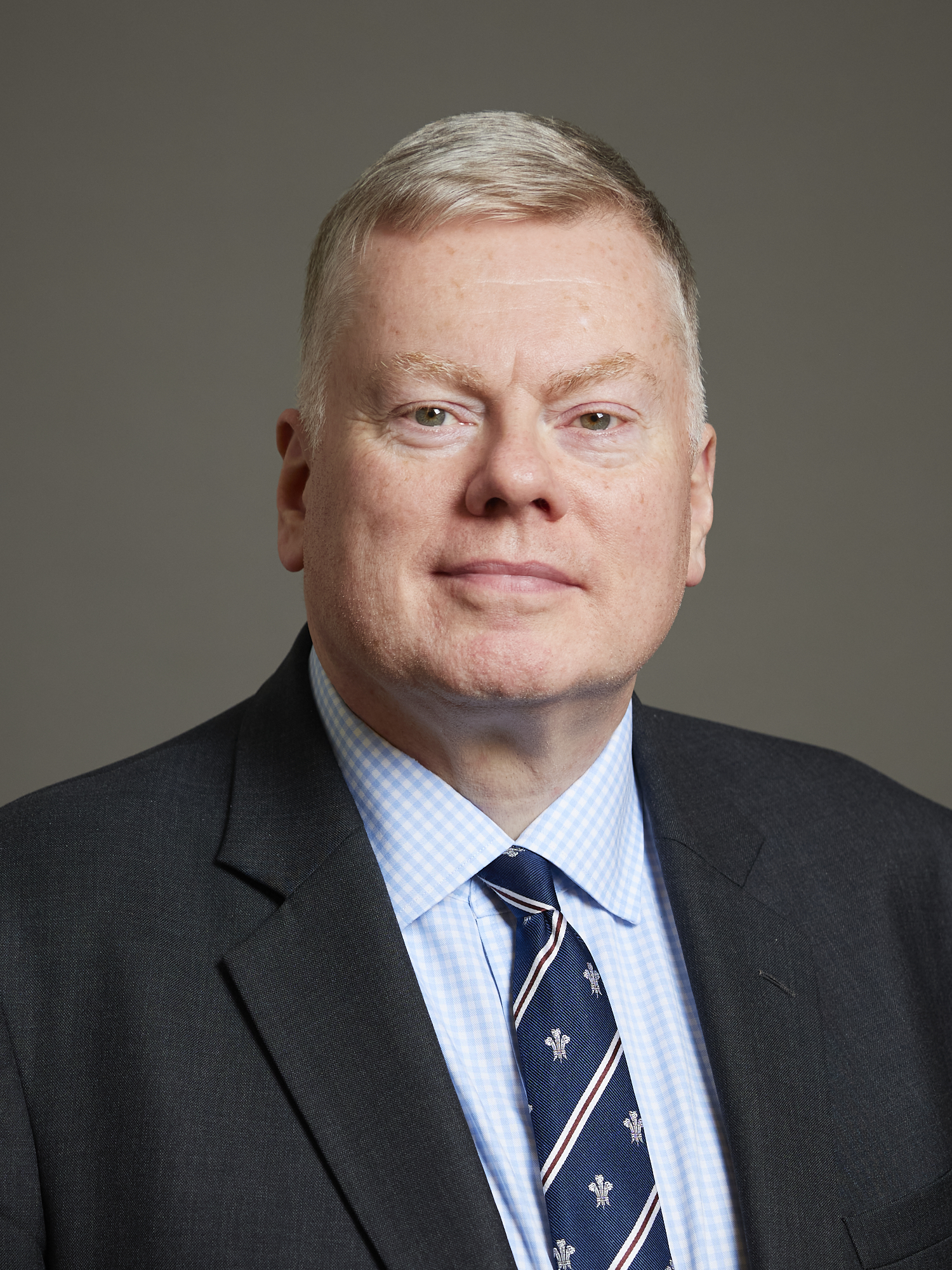
- Official portrait, 2024

Chief Whip of the House of Lords Captain of the Honourable Corps of Gentlemen-at-Arms
- Incumbent
- Assumed office 10 July 2024
- Prime Minister: Keir Starmer; Andy Burnham
- Preceded by: The Baroness Williams of Trafford

Opposition Chief Whip of the House of Lords
- In office 1 June 2021 – 5 July 2024
- Party Leader: Keir Starmer
- Preceded by: The Lord McAvoy
- Succeeded by: The Baroness Williams of Trafford

Member of the House of Lords
- Lord Temporal
- Life peerage 21 June 2010

Personal details
- Born: Roy Francis Kennedy; 9 November 1962 (age 63) Lambeth, London, England
- Party: Labour Co-op
- Spouse: Alicia Kennedy

Roy Francis Kennedy, Baron Kennedy of Southwark, PC (born 9 November 1962) is a British politician and life peer serving as Chief Whip of the Labour Party in the UK House of Lords since 2024. He is a member of the Labour and Co-operative Parties.

== Early life ==
Born in Lambeth, London to Irish parents, Kennedy grew up on the Aylesbury Estate in Southwark. His mother, Frances, worked in the Member's Tea Room in the House of Commons. He attended St Joseph's Primary School in Camberwell and St Thomas the Apostle School in Nunhead.

== Political career ==
In 1986, at the age of 23, Kennedy was elected to represent Newington ward on Southwark Council. He subsequently held several positions on the Council, including Deputy Leader, and was appointed an Honorary Alderman in 2007.

Employed as a full-time Labour staffer from 1990, he became an organiser in Coventry, West Midlands the following year. During the 1992 general election, in the constituency of Coventry South East, Kennedy worked on Jim Cunningham's campaign and helped narrowly defeat Militant-affiliated MP Dave Nellist, who had been deselected as Labour's candidate. He moved to the East Midlands in 1994, where he served as Labour's Regional Director from 1997 to 2005. Kennedy took up the national role of Director of Finance and Compliance in 2005.

Soon after leaving the employment of Labour in September 2010, Kennedy was appointed as an Electoral Commissioner following a nomination by the party. He chose to seek election to Lewisham Council rather than serve a second term on the Commission, and was elected to represent Crofton Park ward from May 2014 to May 2018.

He is a member of the Fabian Society.

=== House of Lords ===
Kennedy was made a life peer in the 2010 Dissolution Honours on the recommendation of Gordon Brown, the outgoing prime minister. He was created Baron Kennedy of Southwark, of Newington in the London Borough of Southwark, on 21 June 2010. He made his maiden speech in the House of Lords on 21 July 2010. During his tenure in Parliament, Kennedy has been Chair of the All Party Parliamentary Group (APPG) on Voter Registration, Vice Chair of the APPG on Credit Unions and a member of the Co-operative Party Parliamentary Group.

He first joined the opposition frontbench as a whip from October 2011 to September 2012, under the leadership of Ed Miliband. Kennedy returned to the role in September 2015, under the leadership of Jeremy Corbyn, and was also appointed as a shadow spokesperson for Communities and Local Government, Housing and Home Affairs.

Kennedy was elected unopposed as Opposition Chief Whip in the Lords in June 2021, and stepped down as an opposition Home Affairs and Cabinet Office spokesperson. He was appointed to the Cabinet Office role less than a month earlier, and stepped down from his remaining spokesperson roles in December 2021. As Opposition Chief Whip, he became Deputy Chair of the Lords Committees and a shadow cabinet attendee, under the leadership of Sir Keir Starmer.

After the 2024 United Kingdom general election, he was appointed Chief Whip of the Labour Party in the House of Lords for the government. In July 2026, he was reappointed to the new government by Andy Burnham.

Kennedy held the title of Honorary President of the National Pubwatch until 11 September 2024 and was succeeded by Graham Evans, Baron Evans of Rainow.

== Personal life ==
Kennedy is married to Alicia Kennedy, former Deputy General Secretary of the Labour Party, who sits alongside him as a life peer in the Lords. They served together on Lewisham Council from 2014 to 2016 as well.

He is a supporter of Millwall Football Club.

Political offices
Preceded by The Baroness Williams of Trafford	Chief Whip of the House of Lords; 2024–present	Incumbent
Preceded by The Baroness Williams of Trafford	Captain of the Honourable Corps of Gentlemen-at-Arms; 2024–present	Incumbent
Party political offices
Preceded by Lord McAvoy	Labour Chief Whip in the House of Lords; 2021–present	Incumbent
Orders of precedence in the United Kingdom
Preceded by The Lord Deben	Gentlemen; Baron Kennedy of Southwark	Followed by The Lord Knight of Weymouth
