= Lord Kennedy (disambiguation) =

Lord Kennedy is a title in the peerage of Scotland held by the Marquess of Ailsa.

Lord Kennedy may also refer to:

- Neil Kennedy, Lord Kennedy (1854–1918), Scottish academic and judge
- Roy Kennedy, Baron Kennedy of Southwark (born 1962), British Labour politician

== See also ==
- Baroness Kennedy (disambiguation)
