= 2002 Lewisham London Borough Council election =

Map of the results of the 2002 Lewisham council election. Conservatives in blue, Greens in green, Labour in red, Liberal Democrats in yellow, Local Education Action by Parents in grey and Socialist Alternative in light red.

Elections to Lewisham London Borough Council were held on 2 May 2002. The whole council was up for election for the first time since the 1998 election.

Lewisham local elections are held every four years, with the next due in 2006.

== Election result ==
Lewisham local election result 2002
Party	Seats	Gains	Losses	Net gain/loss	Seats %	Votes %	Votes	+/−
Labour	45							
Liberal Democrats	4							
Conservative	2							
Socialist	1							
Green	1							
Local Education Action by Parents	1							
