= 2014 Lewisham London Borough Council election =

Local election in England

- 22 May 2014

All 54 seats to Lewisham London Borough Council 28 seats needed for a majority

	First party	Second party
Party	Labour	Green
Seats won	53	1
Seat change	▲14	Steady
Popular vote	96,357	31,169
Percentage	50.7%	16.4%
- Map of the results of the 2014 Lewisham council election. Greens in green and Labour in red.
Council control before election
Labour
Council control after election
Labour

The 2014 Lewisham Council election took place on 22 May 2014 to elect members of Lewisham Council in England. This was on the same day as other local elections.

Labour won 53 of 54 seats in a landslide victory, with one seat in Brockley ward held by the Green Party.

== Results ==
Lewisham local election result 2014
Party	Seats	Gains	Losses	Net gain/loss	Seats %	Votes %	Votes	+/−
Labour	53			+14	98.1	50.7	96,357	
Green	1			0	1.9	16.4	31,169	
Conservative	0			-2		12.4	23,527	
Liberal Democrats	0			-12		9.3	17,610	
People Before Profit	0			0		6.8	12,927	
UKIP	0			0		2.7	5,097	
TUSC	0			0		1.4	2,735	
Unaffiliated	0			0		0.2	370	
CPA	0			0		0.1	128	
All People's Party	0			0		0.1	213	
Democratic Reform Party	0			0		0.0	59	

== Results by ward ==
=== Bellingham ===
Bellingham (3)
Party	Candidate	Votes	%	±%
Labour	Alan Hall	1,819	57.1	+12.0
Labour	Ami Ibitson	1,690	53.1	+10.1
Labour	Jacqueline Paschoud	1,505	47.3	+10.8
People Before Profit	Anne Schuman	451	14.2	+8.2
Conservative	Martin Coombs	432	13.6	−6.3
Conservative	Naomi Bandler	403	12.7	−1.7
Conservative	Roger Pawley	366	11.5	−5.8
Green	Sally Drayton	329	10.3	+4.6
Green	Timothy Nutt	273	8.6	+3.7
Green	Thomas Shotton	241	7.6	+3.5
Liberal Democrats	Linda Beeks	194	6.1	−21.8
Liberal Democrats	Sarah Morris	151	4.7	−18.4
TUSC	Lee Vernon	144	4.5	N/A
Liberal Democrats	Julie Holland	142	4.5	−17.7
Turnout		3,185	31.0	
Labour hold		Swing		
Labour hold		Swing		
Labour hold		Swing		

=== Blackheath ===
Blackheath (3)
Party	Candidate	Votes	%	±%
Labour	Kevin Bonavia	1,780	41.4	+11.2
Labour	Amanda de Ryk	1,656	38.5	+7.9
Labour	Gareth Siddorn	1,370	31.9	+4.9
Conservative	Caroline Attfield	1,012	23.5	−1.9
Conservative	Simon Nundy	982	22.8	−2.8
Liberal Democrats	Christopher Maines	897	20.9	−14.6
Conservative	Jonathan Crozier	832	19.4	−2.6
Liberal Democrats	Adam Nathan	731	17.0	−13.6
Liberal Democrats	Peter Ramrayka	617	14.4	−12.3
Green	Karen Pollock	542	12.6	+4.0
Green	Leslie Fuller	526	12.2	+4.2
Green	Ronald Bullman	473	11.0	+3.3
People Before Profit	Daniel Strange	340	7.9	+4.3
Turnout		4,298	41.5	
Labour gain from Liberal Democrats		Swing		
Labour gain from Liberal Democrats		Swing		
Labour hold		Swing		

=== Brockley ===
Brockley (3)
Party	Candidate	Votes	%	±%
Labour	Obajimi Adefirayne	2,052	45.9	+10.0
Labour	Alicia Kennedy	1,828	40.9	+2.3
Green	John Coughlin	1,495	33.4	−0.5
Labour	Jonathan Watts	1,442	32.2	+1.3
Green	Violeta Vajda	1,228	27.5	+2.4
Green	Matthew Hawkins	1,144	25.6	+1.0
People Before Profit	Tobias Abse	677	15.1	+9.2
Conservative	Julie Kiston	387	8.7	−1.8
Conservative	John Cope	363	8.1	−0.9
Conservative	Roger Lewis	336	7.5	−0.8
Liberal Democrats	Emily Frith	279	6.2	−12.8
UKIP	Ken Webb	260	5.8	N/A
TUSC	Roger Shrives	181	4.0	N/A
Liberal Democrats	Brenda Murray	173	3.9	−10.7
Liberal Democrats	James Rebbeck	157	3.5	−11.0
Turnout		4,473	35.6	
Labour hold		Swing		
Labour hold		Swing		
Green hold		Swing		

=== Catford South ===
Catford South (3)
Party	Candidate	Votes	%	±%
Labour	Abdeslam Amrani	2,177	52.6	+10.7
Labour	Alan Smith	1,975	47.8	+5.6
Labour	Eva Stamirowski	1,952	47.2	+18.1
People Before Profit	David Hamilton	739	17.9	+10.8
Conservative	Helen Harris	615	14.9	−5.6
Green	Graham Faulkner	548	13.2	+5.4
Conservative	Adam Lake	538	13.0	−4.4
Green	Florence Murphy	493	11.9	+5.5
Green	Martin Harlow	491	11.9	+6.4
Conservative	Sylborne Sydial	475	11.5	−2.2
Liberal Democrats	David Cloke	207	5.0	−20.3
TUSC	Jonathan Ball	181	4.4	N/A
Liberal Democrats	Joan Labrom	167	4.0	−15.5
Liberal Democrats	Samuel Foster	144	3.5	−12.8
CPA	Katherine Mills	128	3.1	N/A
Turnout		4,136	37.8	
Labour hold		Swing		
Labour hold		Swing		
Labour hold		Swing		

=== Crofton Park ===
Crofton Park (3)
Party	Candidate	Votes	%	±%
Labour	Christopher Barnham	2,057	47.0	+12.5
Labour	Pauline Morrison	1,969	45.0	+12.9
Labour	Roy Kennedy	1,753	40.0	+11.0
Green	Alice Casey	948	21.6	+5.4
Green	Alison Pick	856	19.5	+5.7
Green	Anne Scott	797	18.2	+6.6
People Before Profit	Nik Antoniades	603	13.8	+9.6
Conservative	Catherine Allen	501	11.4	−3.1
Conservative	Michael Baker	375	8.6	−3.8
Conservative	Karen Lowe	371	8.5	−3.3
Liberal Democrats	Paul Murphy	346	7.9	−25.8
UKIP	Elizabeth Simpson	330	7.5	N/A
Liberal Democrats	Catherine Pluygers	226	5.2	−22.6
Liberal Democrats	William Town	151	3.4	−22.2
Democratic Reform Party	Phillip Badger	59	1.3	N/A
Turnout		4,380	40.6	
Labour hold		Swing		
Labour gain from Liberal Democrats		Swing		
Labour hold		Swing		

=== Downham ===
Downham (3)
Party	Candidate	Votes	%	±%
Labour	Andre Bourne	1,366	37.5	+3.1
Labour	David Britton	1,315	36.1	+3.2
Labour	Olurotimi Ogunbadewa	1,029	28.3	−0.2
Liberal Democrats	Duwayne Brooks	965	26.5	−10.6
UKIP	Massimo Dimambro	853	23.4	N/A
Liberal Democrats	Julia Fletcher	705	19.4	−17.4
Liberal Democrats	Joseph Cobham	686	18.8	−16.0
Conservative	David Davis	358	9.8	−10.4
People Before Profit	Wayne Barron-Woolford	309	8.5	+4.4
Conservative	Michael Hill	306	8.4	−7.9
Green	Catherine Miller	274	7.5	+3.7
Conservative	Nicholas Kent	273	7.5	−7.6
Green	Selim Mustafa	151	4.1	+1.3
Green	Imogen Solly	145	4.0	+0.9
Independent	Mary Culnane	114	3.1	N/A
Turnout		3,642	35.5	
Labour gain from Liberal Democrats		Swing		
Labour gain from Liberal Democrats		Swing		
Labour gain from Liberal Democrats		Swing		

=== Evelyn ===
Evelyn (3)
Party	Candidate	Votes	%	±%
Labour	David Michael	1,930	54.5	−1.0
Labour	James Milne	1,743	49.2	+0.2
Labour	Crada Onuegbu	1,571	44.4	−2.6
People Before Profit	Robert Hallam	651	18.4	+9.6
People Before Profit	Paul Phoenix	601	17.0	N/A
People Before Profit	Barbara Janiszewska	599	16.9	N/A
Green	Emma Bushell	546	15.4	+4.8
Green	Andria Britton	349	9.9	+2.9
Liberal Democrats	Patricia Foreman	323	9.1	−9.3
Green	David Plummer	282	8.0	+2.1
Liberal Democrats	Tom Smithard	205	5.8	−9.0
Liberal Democrats	Martin Passande	194	5.5	−9.0
TUSC	Jessica Leech	161	4.5	N/A
Turnout		3,540	31.1	
Labour hold		Swing		
Labour hold		Swing		
Labour hold		Swing		

=== Forest Hill ===
Forest Hill (3)
Party	Candidate	Votes	%	±%
Labour	Milena Hilton	1,869	42.3	+9.5
Labour	Peter Bernards	1,718	38.8	+8.1
Labour	Paul Upex	1,595	36.1	+5.5
Liberal Democrats	Alexander Feakes	1,118	25.3	−22.6
Liberal Democrats	George Crozier	732	16.5	−20.1
Liberal Democrats	Margot Wilson	707	16.0	−14.7
Green	Oliver Taylor	693	15.7	+4.9
Green	Peter Jones	676	15.3	+7.4
Green	Helen Thompson	545	12.3	+5.8
Conservative	Christopher Ferguson	537	12.1	−4.4
Conservative	Raymond Squires	506	11.4	−7.8
Conservative	Paul Tebble	437	9.9	−3.7
People Before Profit	Ruth Cain	378	8.5	+3.2
UKIP	Paul Oakley	378	8.5	N/A
Turnout		4,423	41.5	
Labour gain from Liberal Democrats		Swing		
Labour gain from Liberal Democrats		Swing		
Labour hold		Swing		

=== Grove Park ===
Grove Park (3)
Party	Candidate	Votes	%	±%
Labour	Suzanne Clarke	1,732	45.1	+7.4
Labour	Hilary Moore	1,288	33.5	+2.8
Labour	Colin Elliott	1,222	31.8	+2.0
Conservative	Christine Allison	1,035	27.0	−4.6
UKIP	Peter Lello	838	21.8	N/A
Conservative	Ross Archer	786	20.5	−10.3
Conservative	Andrew Lee	682	17.8	−9.7
Green	Mark Cunningham	409	10.7	+4.6
People Before Profit	Mary Paul	398	10.4	+7.6
Green	Richard Cox	338	8.8	+4.9
Green	Lee Walker	309	8.0	+4.2
Liberal Democrats	Zoe Dixon	185	4.8	−12.6
Liberal Democrats	Julian Hawkins	156	4.1	−12.6
Liberal Democrats	Linda Hawkins	136	3.5	−19.4
Turnout		3,840	35.9	
Labour hold		Swing		
Labour gain from Conservative		Swing		
Labour gain from Conservative		Swing		

=== Ladywell ===
Ladywell (3)
Party	Candidate	Votes	%	±%
Labour	William Brown	2,038	45.6	+4.7
Labour	Elizabeth Johnston-Franklin	1,960	43.8	+6.5
Labour	Carl Handley	1,860	41.6	+9.9
Green	Michael Keogh	1,335	29.9	−0.7
Green	Andrea Carey Fuller	1,221	27.3	−2.7
Green	Clare Phipps	1,092	24.4	−1.7
People Before Profit	Helen Mercer	716	16.0	+7.7
Conservative	Hamish McArthur	364	8.1	−2.2
Conservative	Andrew Paterson	354	7.9	−1.3
Conservative	Mark Watson	312	7.0	−2.6
Liberal Democrats	Ben Brooks	243	5.4	−11.6
Liberal Democrats	Heidi Degen	198	4.4	−10.9
Liberal Democrats	Tom Lawrence	157	3.5	−9.0
Turnout		4,470	45.0	
Labour hold		Swing		
Labour hold		Swing		
Labour hold		Swing		

=== Lee Green ===
Lee Green (3)
Party	Candidate	Votes	%	±%
Labour	James Mallory	2,156	46.5	+11.7
Labour	Simon Hooks	1,973	42.5	+11.5
Labour	Patricia Raven	1,598	34.5	+10.2
Liberal Democrats	Pauline Beck	885	19.1	−17.6
Liberal Democrats	Sven Griesenbeck	794	17.1	−14.9
Conservative	John Sweeney	684	14.7	−4.9
Conservative	Brian Chipps	681	14.7	−4.2
Green	Charles Acton	646	13.9	+7.5
Liberal Democrats	Mark Bennett	568	12.2	−17.3
Conservative	Mahyar Tousi	542	11.7	−5.6
People Before Profit	Peter Richardson	526	11.3	N/A
Green	Andrea Hughes	476	10.3	+0.7
Green	Eoin Shea	415	8.9	+3.6
Independent	Gerard Ambrose	256	5.5	−1.9
TUSC	Steven Rumney	137	3.0	N/A
Turnout		4,638	44.2	
Labour gain from Liberal Democrats		Swing		
Labour hold		Swing		
Labour gain from Liberal Democrats		Swing		

=== Lewisham Central ===
Lewisham Central (3)
Party	Candidate	Votes	%	±%
Labour	Stella Jeffrey	2,514	55.1	+10.5
Labour	Damien Egan	2,412	52.9	+3.2
Labour	Joani Reid	2,085	45.7	+3.6
Green	Corin Ashwell	632	13.9	+5.4
Green	Susan Luxton	620	13.6	+6.5
Conservative	Benjamin Appleby	584	12.8	−0.8
People Before Profit	Richard Proctor	505	11.1	+6.0
UKIP	Geoffrey Fleming	429	9.4	N/A
Conservative	Antony Schomburg	421	9.2	−3.3
Conservative	Tracy Sutton	417	9.1	−2.3
Green	Storm Poorun	410	9.0	+2.7
Liberal Democrats	Rebecca Foster	325	7.1	−22.5
Liberal Democrats	Richard Hebditch	222	4.9	−21.5
Liberal Democrats	Marcus Mayers	213	4.7	−18.7
TUSC	Andrew Beadle	153	3.4	N/A
Turnout		4,559	34.6	
Labour hold		Swing		
Labour hold		Swing		
Labour hold		Swing		

=== New Cross ===
New Cross (3)
Party	Candidate	Votes	%	±%
Labour	Brenda Dacres	1,862	51.2	+0.2
Labour	Joseph Dromey	1,688	46.4	−2.8
Labour	Paul Maslin	1,342	36.9	−8.3
People Before Profit	Ray Barron-Woolford	884	24.3	+11.7
People Before Profit	Barbara Raymond	729	20.0	+7.9
Green	Tessa Gooding	634	17.4	+8.5
People Before Profit	Clive Baulch	588	16.2	+6.3
Green	Sylvia Green	453	12.5	+3.9
Green	Andrew Iredale	384	10.6	+3.1
Conservative	David Edgerton	258	7.1	−2.9
Conservative	Orde Solomons	229	6.3	−2.8
TUSC	Susanna Farley	181	5.0	N/A
Liberal Democrats	Alexander Frith	176	4.8	−13.2
Liberal Democrats	Derek Gambell	109	3.0	−11.2
Liberal Democrats	Douglas Law	85	2.3	−11.6
Turnout		3,638	32.0	
Labour hold		Swing		
Labour hold		Swing		
Labour hold		Swing		

=== Perry Vale ===
Perry Vale (3)
Party	Candidate	Votes	%	±%
Labour	John Paschoud	2,212	50.8	+13.3
Labour	Alan Till	1,961	45.0	+8.6
Labour	Susan Wise	1,942	44.6	+8.0
Green	Romayne Phoenix	759	17.4	+7.9
Green	Matthew Scannell-Soames	727	16.7	+7.9
Conservative	Anthony Lee	633	14.5	−2.5
People Before Profit	David Brassington	562	12.9	+7.5
Conservative	Bettina Skeen	536	12.3	−2.4
Green	Ileana Vajda	510	11.7	+3.2
Conservative	William Stevenson	491	11.3	−3.9
UKIP	Maxine Mackay	447	10.3	N/A
Liberal Democrats	Jane Russell	285	6.5	−24.4
Liberal Democrats	Philip Ivory	263	6.0	−24.3
Liberal Democrats	Andrew McIlwraith	227	5.2	−19.3
Turnout		4,353	38.8	
Labour hold		Swing		
Labour hold		Swing		
Labour hold		Swing		

=== Rushey Green ===
Rushey Green (3)
Party	Candidate	Votes	%	±%
Labour	Helen Klier	1,784	54.5	+15.6
Labour	John Muldoon	1,453	44.4	+7.7
Labour	James Walsh	1,246	38.1	−7.8
People Before Profit	Damian Griffiths	559	17.1	+11.5
Green	Natalie Hall	501	15.3	+8.0
Green	Natasha Elliott	468	14.3	+7.3
Green	John Keidan	334	10.2	+4.9
Conservative	Thomas Burley	329	10.1	−1.8
Conservative	Susannah Cleverly	256	7.8	−2.5
All Peoples Party	Melinda Adams	213	6.5	N/A
Liberal Democrats	Mary Malham	173	5.3	−26.5
Liberal Democrats	Frances Nestor	151	4.6	−21.8
Liberal Democrats	Benjamin Walton	116	3.5	−19.8
Turnout		3,272	33.4	
Labour hold		Swing		
Labour hold		Swing		
Labour hold		Swing		

=== Sydenham ===
Sydenham (3)
Party	Candidate	Votes	%	±%
Labour	Christine Best	2,341	54.4	+6.2
Labour	Liam Curran	1,705	39.6	+4.2
Labour	Rachel Onikosi	1,684	39.1	+1.7
Conservative	Anthony Bays	727	16.9	−5.7
Conservative	Alexandra Squires	693	16.1	−3.8
Green	Catriona White	657	15.3	+5.6
UKIP	Peter Holland	572	13.3	N/A
Conservative	Alistair Stark	564	13.1	−2.8
Green	Petroc ap Seisyllt	521	12.1	+2.8
Green	Marcus Boyle	502	11.7	+5.5
People Before Profit	James Smith	436	10.1	+5.1
Liberal Democrats	Catherine Polling	271	6.3	−11.7
TUSC	Frances Brackley	235	5.5	N/A
Liberal Democrats	John Russell	227	5.3	−19.8
Liberal Democrats	Adrien Smith	116	2.7	−18.6
Turnout		4,303	37.9	
Labour hold		Swing		
Labour hold		Swing		
Labour hold		Swing		

=== Telegraph Hill ===
Telegraph Hill (3)
Party	Candidate	Votes	%	±%
Labour	Joan Millbank	2,278	50.1	+8.4
Labour	Paul Bell	2,153	47.4	+3.7
Labour	Luke Sorba	1,761	38.8	+4.8
People Before Profit	John Hamilton	1,259	27.7	N/A
Green	Sarah Venn	784	17.3	+1.7
TUSC	Christopher Flood	659	14.5	−4.1
Green	Emily Woodhouse	647	14.2	+0.2
Green	Nicholas Torry	632	13.9	+3.3
TUSC	James Kerr	321	7.1	N/A
Conservative	Stephanie Reeves	293	6.4	−3.1
TUSC	Cheryl McLeod	278	6.1	N/A
Conservative	Jonathan Welland	254	5.6	−3.7
UKIP	Vivian Waine	247	5.4	N/A
Conservative	Oliver Skeen	213	4.7	−4.1
Liberal Democrats	Michael Garrard	162	3.6	−11.6
Liberal Democrats	Anthony Lloyd	154	3.4	−9.4
Liberal Democrats	Arthur Peake	118	2.6	−9.7
Turnout		4,543	39.9	
Labour hold		Swing		
Labour hold		Swing		
Labour hold		Swing		

=== Whitefoot ===
Whitefoot (3)
Party	Candidate	Votes	%	±%
Labour	Janet Daby	1,851	53.6	+10.7
Labour	Mark Ingleby	1,651	47.8	+17.3
Labour	Jonathan Slater	1,444	41.8	+15.6
UKIP	Matthew Pavey	743	21.5	N/A
Conservative	Cherith Hateley	435	12.6	−4.3
People Before Profit	Martin Allen	417	12.1	+8.8
Conservative	Iain Urquhart	349	10.1	−5.4
Liberal Democrats	Daniel Dignan	323	9.4	−27.3
Liberal Democrats	Janet Hurst	315	9.1	−25.7
Green	Jeremy Hicks	234	6.8	+3.5
Liberal Democrats	Vijay Naidu	184	5.3	−24.5
Green	Anna Somerset	171	5.0	+1.7
Green	Julian Sanders	159	4.6	+1.9
TUSC	Peter Redfarn	104	3.0	N/A
Turnout		3,453	34.7	
Labour hold		Swing		
Labour gain from Liberal Democrats		Swing		
Labour gain from Liberal Democrats		Swing		
