= Alicia Kennedy, Baroness Kennedy of Cradley =

British Labour politician

The Right Honourable The Baroness Kennedy of Cradley
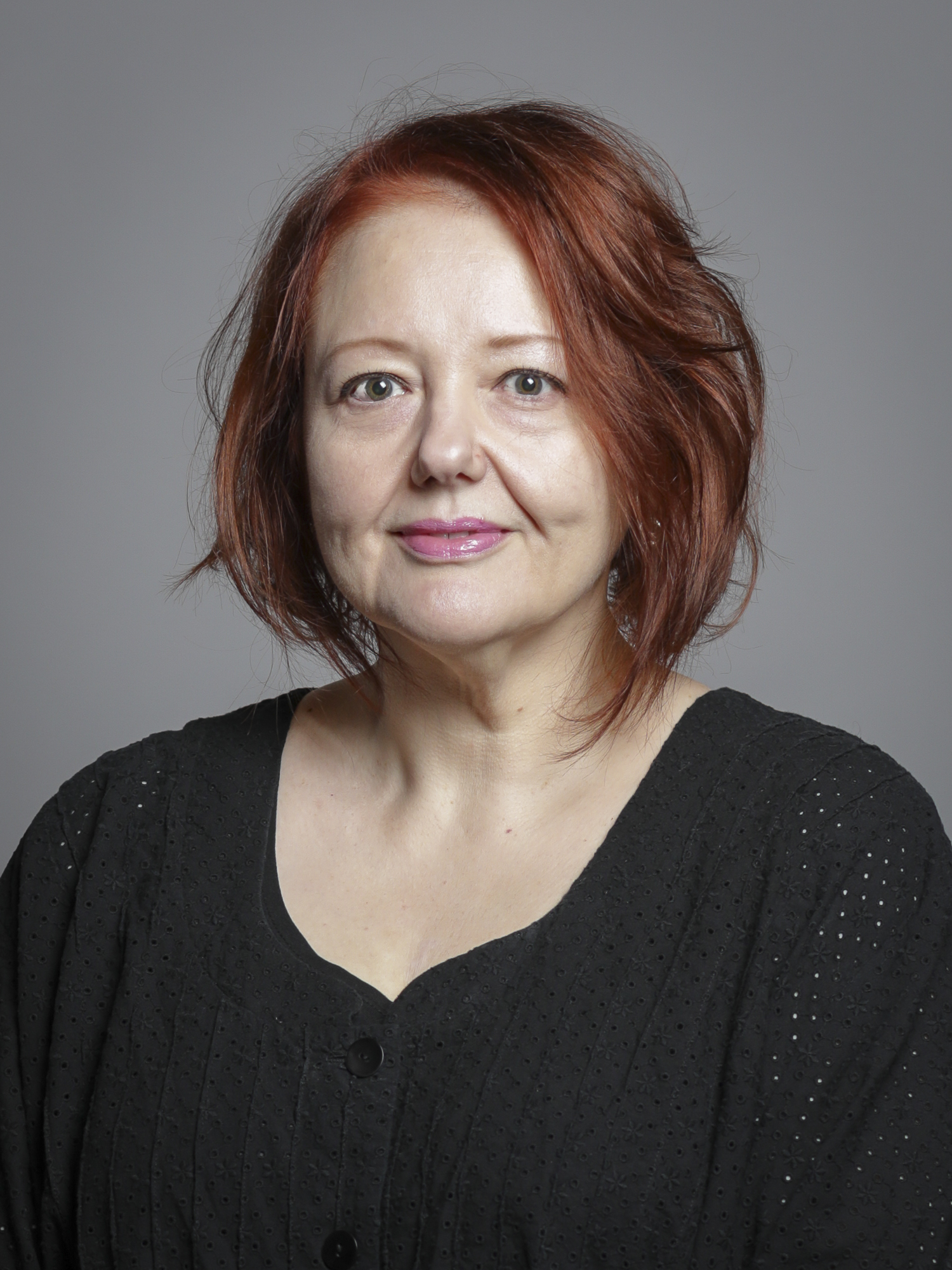

Deputy General Secretary of the Labour Party
- In office 2006–2011 Serving with Chris Lennie (2001–2011)
- Leader: Tony Blair; Gordon Brown; Ed Miliband

Member of the House of Lords
- Lord Temporal
- Life peerage 19 September 2013

Personal details
- Born: 22 March 1969 (age 57)
- Party: Non-affiliated
- Other political affiliations: Labour Party (until June 2020)
- Spouse: Lord Kennedy of Southwark
- Education: University of Warwick

Alicia Pamela Kennedy, Baroness Kennedy of Cradley (born 22 March 1969) is a British Labour politician and member of the House of Lords.

== Early life ==
Kennedy attended the University of Warwick between 1988 and 1991, gaining a BSc in psychology.

== Professional career ==
She worked as a regional organiser for the Labour Party, 1995–1997, political advisor to Joan Ruddock MP, 1997–1998 and a policy advisor to the leader of the London Borough of Lambeth, 1999–2000.

She then worked for the party's central organisation, including as Chief of Staff, 2001–2005 and Deputy General Secretary, 2006–2011. She was an advisor to party leader Ed Miliband from 2011 to 2013.

In June 2020 she was appointed Director of Generation Rent. In July 2021, in the wake of the Covid crisis, she and Lord Bird of Notting Hill called for an end to section 21 evictions in the private rental sector. In March 2022 she joined calls for a rent freeze in London.

== Political career ==
On 19 September 2013, she was created a life peer as Baroness Kennedy of Cradley, of Cradley in the Metropolitan Borough of Dudley on the nomination from Labour leader Ed Miliband.

In the House of Lords she was a member of Joint Committee on the Draft Modern Slavery Bill which examined the proposals from the Government and presently serves on the Affordable Childcare Committee.

In 2014 she was elected as a councillor in the London Borough of Lewisham representing Brockley ward. She resigned in September 2016.

== Personal life ==
She is married to Roy Kennedy, Baron Kennedy of Southwark, a fellow Labour peer and a Lewisham councillor.

Party political offices
Preceded by Chris Lennie	Deputy General Secretary of the Labour Party; 2006–2011; With: Chris Lennie	Vacant
