= Lewisham People Before Profit =

Political party in the London Borough of Lewisham

Lewisham People Before Profit (LPBP) was a minor, left-wing political party based in the London Borough of Lewisham in the United Kingdom and established around 2008–2009. The party has stood for election outside Lewisham as People Before Profit.

The party campaigned against government cut-backs to local services, and for improved pay and conditions for working people. The party mainly contested elections to the borough council and mayoralty in Lewisham.

== Leaders ==
The party's constitution stipulated that it had no leader and the title was used purely for the purposes of the Electoral Commission regulations. The leader when the party was deregistered in November 2022 was Patricia Richardson.

== History ==
LPBP candidates included Ray Woolford, who was previously a candidate for the Social Democratic Party, Liberal Democrats, and the Conservatives, as well as an independent candidate. Vice reported that at the same time LPBP was campaigning about housing, Woolford was an estate agent and director of the Residential Landlords Association. Several leading members left in 2015, labelling LPBP as an "authoritarian leader cult."

== Elections ==
=== 2010 Lewisham Council election ===
The party stood candidates in alliance with the Socialist Party of England and Wales for the 2010 local elections and the 2011 Bellingham ward by-election.

=== 2012 Assembly Election ===
In May 2012, LPBP stood one candidate, Barbara Raymond, for the Greenwich and Lewisham constituency of the London Assembly. Raymond polled 6,873 votes, 5.2% of the total, finishing fifth out of eight candidates.

=== 2014 Lewisham Council and Mayoral Election ===
In May 2014, John Hamilton contested the election for the Mayor of Lewisham, despite LPBP's policy being that the post should be scrapped. He polled 6,014 first preference votes, or 8.3%. Hamilton came fifth out of seven candidates.

In the council election on the same day, 22 LPBP candidates stood for the 54 available seats, polling 12,957 votes in total out of 83,406, 15.5% of the total. (Note: Figures based on the initial declared result. Note subsequent correction here.) LPBP's best result came in the Telegraph Hill ward where mayoral candidate John Hamilton polled 1,259 votes, to finish in fourth place in the contest for three seats.

=== 2014 Rochester and Strood by-election ===
On 24 October 2014 it was confirmed that Nick Long of LPBP would contest the Rochester and Strood by-election on 20 November. Long finished in joint 7th place out of 13 candidates, polling 69 votes, less than 0.2% of the total. The election was won by the UKIP candidate, Mark Reckless.

=== 2015 general election ===
LPBP contested two seats in the 2015 general election. In Lewisham East the party received 0.9% (6th place out of 7) while in Lewisham Deptford the party received 1.4% (6th place out of 10). Labour retained both seats with significantly increased majorities.

=== 2021 Lewisham Council by-elections ===
LPBP contested 3 of the 4 by-elections held alongside the 2021 local elections but didn't win any of the seats.
