= 2010 Lewisham London Borough Council election =

Map of the results of the 2010 Lewisham council election. Conservatives in blue, Greens in green, Labour in red and Liberal Democrats in yellow.

Elections to the London Borough of Lewisham council were held on 6 May 2010. The elections were won by the Labour Party, who achieved a landslide victory.

== Results ==
Lewisham Council election result 2010
Party	Seats	Gains	Losses	Net gain/loss	Seats %	Votes %	Votes	+/−
Labour	37			+13				
Liberal Democrats	12		-5	-5				
Conservative	2			-1				
Green	1	0	-5	-5				
Socialist	0	0	-2	-2	0.0			

== Results by Ward ==
=== Bellingham ===
Bellingham (3)
Party	Candidate	Votes	%	±%
Labour	Alan Hall	2,380	45.1	
Labour	Ami Ibitson	2,269	43.0	
Labour	Ron Stockbridge	1,925	36.5	
Liberal Democrats	Richard Adams	1,472	27.9	
Liberal Democrats	Jenni Steele	1,220	23.1	
Liberal Democrats	Daniel Dignan	1,170	22.2	
Conservative	Michael Baker	1,048	19.9	
Conservative	Roger Pawley	911	17.3	
Conservative	Paul Tebble	761	14.4	
People Before Profit	Jenny Stewart	318	6.0	
Green	Phil Laurie	300	5.7	
Green	Tali Febland	258	4.9	
Green	Shenaz Navaz	217	4.1	
Turnout		5,276	54.6	
Labour hold		Swing		
Labour hold		Swing		
Labour hold		Swing		

=== Blackheath ===
Blackheath (3)
Party	Candidate	Votes	%	±%
Liberal Democrats	Christopher Maines	2,346	35.5	
Liberal Democrats	Amanda de Ryk	2,023	30.6	
Labour	Kevin Bonavia	1,996	30.2	
Labour	Colin Elliott	1,781	27.0	
Labour	Paul Keane	1,776	26.9	
Liberal Democrats	Godfried Gyechie	1,761	26.7	
Conservative	Simon Nundy	1,694	25.6	
Conservative	Caroline Attfield	1,679	25.4	
Conservative	Dru Vesty	1,451	22.0	
Green	Charles Acton	570	8.6	
Green	Alexander Boniface	526	8.0	
Green	Luc Benyon	506	7.7	
People Before Profit	Nicholas Ingham	238	3.6	
Turnout		6,605	67.8	
Liberal Democrats hold		Swing		
Liberal Democrats hold		Swing		
Labour gain from Liberal Democrats		Swing		

=== Brockley ===
Brockley (3)
Party	Candidate	Votes	%	±%
Labour	Vicky Foxcroft	2,632	38.6	
Labour	Jimi Adefiranye	2,449	35.9	
Green	Darren Johnson	2,313	33.9	
Labour	Paul Newing	2,105	30.9	
Green	Dean Walton	1,707	25.1	
Green	Romayne Phoenix	1,676	24.6	
Liberal Democrats	Keith Adderley	1,293	19.0	
Liberal Democrats	Nancy Sarre	995	14.6	
Liberal Democrats	David Morpurgo	990	14.5	
Conservative	Carolyn Freeman	713	10.5	
Conservative	Ardian Preci	611	9.0	
Conservative	Orde Solomons	563	8.3	
People Before Profit	Patrick McGinley	410	6.0	
People Before Profit	Toby Abse	403	5.9	
Turnout		6,814	59.0	
Labour gain from Green		Swing		
Labour gain from Green		Swing		
Green hold		Swing		

=== Catford South ===
Catford South (3)
Party	Candidate	Votes	%	±%
Labour	Alan Smith	2,722	42.2	
Labour	Skip Amrani	2,703	41.9	
Labour	Eva Stamirowski	1,885	29.2	
Liberal Democrats	Janet Bowens	1,630	25.3	
Conservative	Andrew Lee	1,328	20.5	
Liberal Democrats	Shirley Drummonds	1,257	19.5	
Conservative	Robert McIlveen	1,124	17.4	
Liberal Democrats	Vijay Naidu	1,054	16.3	
Conservative	Sylbourne Sydial	881	13.7	
Green	Fiona Aldridge	502	7.8	
People Before Profit	David Hamilton	455	7.1	
Green	John Bensted	416	6.4	
Independent	David Michael	378	5.9	
Green	Frances Brackley	356	5.5	
Turnout		6,452	62.5	
Labour hold		Swing		
Labour hold		Swing		
Labour hold		Swing		

=== Crofton Park ===
Crofton Park (3)
Party	Candidate	Votes	%	±%
Labour	Jackie Addison	2,309	34.5	
Liberal Democrats	John Bowen	2,256	33.7	
Labour	Pauline Morrison	2,151	32.1	
Labour	Sylvia Scott	1,944	29.0	
Liberal Democrats	Michélé McClarren	1,863	27.8	
Liberal Democrats	Barrie Hall	1,714	25.6	
Green	Hatice Gunes	1,087	16.2	
Conservative	Kate Allen	969	14.5	
Green	Jim Jepps	927	13.8	
Conservative	Michael Rutherford	831	12.4	
Conservative	David Furze	789	11.8	
Green	Roger Sedgley	779	11.6	
People Before Profit	Karl Thomas	282	4.2	
Turnout		6,696	64.8	
Labour hold		Swing		
Liberal Democrats gain from Labour		Swing		
Labour hold		Swing		

=== Downham ===
Downham (3)
Party	Candidate	Votes	%	±%
Liberal Democrats	Duwayne Brooks	2,044	37.1	
Liberal Democrats	Julia Fletcher	2,029	36.8	
Liberal Democrats	Jenni Clutten	1,920	34.8	
Labour	Ian Kearne	1,897	34.4	
Labour	Ian McKenzie	1,814	32.9	
Labour	Timi Ogunbadewa	1,573	28.5	
Conservative	Teresa Bentinck	1,111	20.2	
Conservative	Sally Gander	896	16.3	
Conservative	Suzanne Watts	832	15.1	
People Before Profit	Fran Rogers	228	4.1	
Green	Emily Elkington	211	3.8	
Green	Stephen Thomas	172	3.1	
Green	Selim Mustafa	156	2.8	
Turnout		5,511	55.6	
Liberal Democrats hold		Swing		
Liberal Democrats hold		Swing		
Liberal Democrats hold		Swing		

=== Evelyn ===
Evelyn (3)
Party	Candidate	Votes	%	±%
Labour	Joseph Folorunso	2,795	55.5	
Labour	Sam Owolabi-Oluyole	2,469	49.0	
Labour	Crada Onuegbu	2,367	47.0	
Liberal Democrats	Ben Brooks	925	18.4	
Liberal Democrats	Jane Russell	746	14.8	
Liberal Democrats	Julian Hawkins	732	14.5	
Conservative	Philip Badger	719	14.3	
Conservative	Guy Bentley	676	13.4	
Conservative	Jonathan Woodhead	562	11.2	
Green	Sylvia Green	533	10.6	
People Before Profit	Alexia Wdowski	445	8.8	
Green	Paul Griffiths	355	7.0	
Green	Jeremy Hicks	299	5.9	
Independent	Malcolm Cadman	294	5.8	
Turnout		5,037	51.8	
Labour hold		Swing		
Labour hold		Swing		
Labour hold		Swing		

=== Forest Hill ===
Forest Hill (3)
Party	Candidate	Votes	%	±%
Liberal Democrats	Alex Feakes	3,144	47.9	
Liberal Democrats	Philip Peake	2,405	36.6	
Labour	Anne Affiku	2,154	32.8	
Labour	Jacqueline Paschoud	2,019	30.7	
Liberal Democrats	John Russell	2,014	30.7	
Labour	Patrick McMorrow	2,009	30.6	
Conservative	Raymond Squires	1,262	19.2	
Conservative	André Bourne	1,084	16.5	
Conservative	Kenneth Lemeh	893	13.6	
Green	Anne Scott	712	10.8	
Green	Ronald Bullman	522	7.9	
Green	Alexandra Rae	424	6.5	
People Before Profit	Nathalia Richards	345	5.3	
Turnout		6,570	64.4	
Liberal Democrats hold		Swing		
Liberal Democrats hold		Swing		
Labour gain from Liberal Democrats		Swing		

=== Grove Park ===
Grove Park (3)
Party	Candidate	Votes	%	±%
Labour	Suzannah Clarke	2,312	37.7	
Conservative	Christine Allison	1,937	31.6	
Conservative	David Britton	1,885	30.8	
Labour	Hilary Moore	1,883	30.7	
Labour	Mark Ingleby	1,824	29.8	
Conservative	Thomas Philpott	1,686	27.5	
Liberal Democrats	Linda Hawkins	1,404	22.9	
Liberal Democrats	Patricia Poulton	1,064	17.4	
Liberal Democrats	Sangita Kansal	1,024	16.7	
Green	Mark Cunningham	372	6.1	
Green	Mark Engel	236	3.9	
Green	Julian Sanders	233	3.8	
People Before Profit	Harold Shalet	171	2.8	
Turnout		6,128	59.1	
Labour gain from Conservative		Swing		
Conservative hold		Swing		
Conservative hold		Swing		

=== Ladywell ===
Ladywell (3)
Party	Candidate	Votes	%	±%
Labour	Vincent Davis	2,462	40.9	
Labour	Helen Gibson	2,250	37.3	
Labour	Tim Shand	1,909	31.7	
Green	Charlotte Dingle	1,845	30.6	
Green	Susan Luxton	1,805	30.0	
Green	Ute Michel	1,575	26.1	
Liberal Democrats	Heidi Degen	1,022	17.0	
Liberal Democrats	Ruby Peacock	923	15.3	
Liberal Democrats	Roger Orr	753	12.5	
Conservative	Jonathan Haley	623	10.3	
Conservative	Mark Watson	578	9.6	
Conservative	Alando Spaulding	553	9.2	
People Before Profit	Helen Mercer	503	8.3	
Turnout		6,026	64.3	
Labour gain from Green		Swing		
Labour gain from Green		Swing		
Labour gain from Green		Swing		

=== Lee Green ===
Lee Green (3)
Party	Candidate	Votes	%	±%
Liberal Democrats	Pauline Beck	2,563	36.7	
Labour	Jim Mallory	2,426	34.8	
Liberal Democrats	Sven Griesenbeck	2,231	32.0	
Labour	Jamie Milne	2,162	31.0	
Liberal Democrats	Jim Caple	2,056	29.5	
Labour	Gilbert Oshevire	1,697	24.3	
Conservative	Joanna Britton	1,368	19.6	
Conservative	Susannah Cleverly	1,319	18.9	
Conservative	Nicholas Tennant	1,206	17.3	
Green	Andrea Hughes	670	9.6	
Independent	Gerard Ambrose	515	7.4	
Green	Catriona White	444	6.4	
Green	Juman Simaan	369	5.3	
People Before Profit	Jessica Easter	300	4.3	
Turnout		6,978	67.9	
Liberal Democrats hold		Swing		
Labour gain from Liberal Democrats		Swing		
Liberal Democrats hold		Swing		

=== Lewisham Central ===
Lewisham Central (3)
Party	Candidate	Votes	%	±%
Labour	Damien Egan	3,096	49.7	
Labour	Stella Jeffrey	2,777	44.6	
Labour	Michael Harris	2,622	42.1	
Liberal Democrats	Max Calo	1,844	29.6	
Liberal Democrats	Ingrid Chetram	1,646	26.4	
Liberal Democrats	David Edgerton	1,459	23.4	
Conservative	Ben Appleby	844	13.6	
Conservative	Paul Oakley	777	12.5	
Conservative	James Pritchard	709	11.4	
Green	Hazel Jones	529	8.5	
Green	Chiedza Bassey	440	7.1	
Green	Celia McNicholas	395	6.3	
People Before Profit	Richard Proctor	315	5.1	
Turnout		6,228	56.9	
Labour gain from Liberal Democrats		Swing		
Labour gain from Liberal Democrats		Swing		
Labour hold		Swing		

=== New Cross ===
New Cross (3)
Party	Candidate	Votes	%	±%
Labour	Madeliene Long	2,690	51.0	
Labour	Stephen Padmore	2,593	49.2	
Labour	Paul Maslin	2,394	45.4	
Liberal Democrats	Ann Atkins	947	18.0	
Liberal Democrats	William Hervey	750	14.2	
Liberal Democrats	Chris Gee	734	13.9	
People Before Profit	Susanna Farley	666	12.6	
People Before Profit	Barbara Raymond	639	12.1	
Conservative	Daniel Hollis	529	10.0	
People Before Profit	Raymond Woolford	521	9.9	
Conservative	Mark Parsons	481	9.1	
Green	Fiona McConnell	470	8.9	
Conservative	Andrew Paterson	465	8.8	
Green	Michael Keogh	456	8.6	
Green	Conall Watson	397	7.5	
Turnout		5,274	52.4	
Labour hold		Swing		
Labour hold		Swing		
Labour hold		Swing		

=== Perry Vale ===
Perry Vale (3)
Party	Candidate	Votes	%	±%
Labour	John Paschoud	2,494	37.5	
Labour	Susan Wise	2,435	36.6	
Labour	Alan Till	2,420	36.4	
Liberal Democrats	Mark Bennett	2,056	30.9	
Liberal Democrats	Will Howells	2,015	30.3	
Liberal Democrats	Cherese Lang	1,632	24.5	
Conservative	Tony Lee	1,129	17.0	
Conservative	Omer Ahmet	1,014	15.2	
Conservative	Bettina Skeen	978	14.7	
Green	Catherine Miller	635	9.5	
Green	Fiona Hull	587	8.8	
Green	Jill Rutter	566	8.5	
People Before Profit	Anne Schuman	357	5.4	
Turnout		6,651	63.5	
Labour hold		Swing		
Labour hold		Swing		
Labour hold		Swing		

=== Rushey Green ===
Rushey Green (3)
Party	Candidate	Votes	%	±%
Labour	Peggy Fitzsimons	2,439	45.9	
Labour	Helen Klier	2,065	38.9	
Labour	John Muldoon	1,948	36.7	
Liberal Democrats	Halina Bowen	1,688	31.8	
Liberal Democrats	Dominik Choy	1,404	26.4	
Liberal Democrats	Victor Ofosu	1,239	23.3	
Conservative	Brian Chipps	631	11.9	
Conservative	Barbara Kennedy	546	10.3	
Conservative	Rowland Johnson	543	10.2	
Green	Edward Burls	385	7.3	
Green	Joseph Lewis	370	7.0	
People Before Profit	Warren Carter	295	5.6	
Green	Lee Roach	279	5.3	
People Before Profit	Jean Kysow	177	3.3	
Turnout		5,310	56.5	
Labour hold		Swing		
Labour hold		Swing		
Labour hold		Swing		

=== Sydenham ===
Sydenham (3)
Party	Candidate	Votes	%	±%
Labour	Christine Best	3,200	48.2	
Labour	Marion Nisbet	2,482	37.4	
Labour	Liam Curran	2,350	35.4	
Liberal Democrats	Stephen Locke	1,670	25.1	
Conservative	Ross Archer	1,498	22.6	
Liberal Democrats	Angela McDonald	1,414	21.3	
Conservative	Eddie Capone	1,320	19.9	
Liberal Democrats	Kate Polling	1,196	18.0	
Conservative	Dan Tubb	1,053	15.9	
Green	Rachel Braverman	647	9.7	
Green	Nick Medic	616	9.3	
Green	Storm Poorun	414	6.2	
People Before Profit	James Smith	334	5.0	
Turnout		6,642	61.7	
Labour hold		Swing		
Labour hold		Swing		
Labour hold		Swing		

=== Telegraph Hill ===
Telegraph Hill (3)
Party	Candidate	Votes	%	±%
Labour	Paul Bell	2,861	43.7	
Labour	Joan Millbank	2,735	41.7	
Labour	Dan Whittle	2,231	34.0	
Socialist	Ian Page	1,362	20.8	
Socialist	Chris Flood	1,216	18.6	
Green	Darren Flint	1,023	15.6	
Liberal Democrats	Derek Gambell	993	15.2	
Green	Priscilla Cotterell	916	14.0	
Socialist	Jess Leech	877	13.4	
Liberal Democrats	Shahab Ispahani	842	12.8	
Liberal Democrats	Joan Labrom	809	12.3	
Green	William Konos	694	10.6	
Conservative	Andrew Deane	621	9.5	
Conservative	Julie Kitson	612	9.3	
Conservative	Lara Robson	574	8.8	
Turnout		6,554	62.3	
Labour gain from Socialist		Swing		
Labour hold		Swing		
Labour gain from Socialist		Swing		

=== Whitefoot ===
Whitefoot (3)
Party	Candidate	Votes	%	±%
Labour	Janet Daby	2,375	42.9	
Liberal Democrats	Pete Pattisson	2,030	36.7	
Liberal Democrats	Patsy Foreman	1,925	34.8	
Labour	Matt O'Mullane	1,697	30.6	
Liberal Democrats	Anthony Francis	1,650	29.8	
Labour	David Warwick	1,453	26.2	
Conservative	William Bellers	936	16.9	
Conservative	Michael Hill	860	15.5	
Conservative	Nicholas Kent	789	14.2	
People Before Profit	Dominic Spitzer	185	3.3	
Green	Alan Dingle	183	3.3	
Green	Sally Drayton	183	3.3	
Green	Jane Swann	151	2.7	
Turnout		5,538	59.3	
Labour gain from Liberal Democrats		Swing		
Liberal Democrats hold		Swing		
Liberal Democrats hold		Swing		
