= 2018 Lewisham London Borough Council election =

Local election in England

2018 Lewisham Council election
- 3 May 2018

All 54 seats to Lewisham London Borough Council 28 seats needed for a majority
	First party
Party	Labour
Last election	53 seats, 50.7%
Seats won	54
Seat change	▲1
Popular vote	120,263
Percentage	60.2%
Swing	▲9.5%
- Map of the results.
Council control before election
Labour
Council control after election
Labour

Elections for Lewisham London Borough Council were held on 3 May 2018, the same day as for other London Boroughs. All 54 seats were up for election. The Labour Party won all 54 seats in a landslide victory, winning 60% of the popular vote. The Green Party lost their sole council seat, leaving the party without representation on Lewisham Borough Council for the first time in 16 years.

== Overall results ==
Lewisham local election result 2018
Party	Seats	Gains	Losses	Net gain/loss	Seats %	Votes %	Votes	+/−
Labour	54	1	0	+1	100.0	60.2	120,263	+9.5
Conservative	0	0	0	0		13.9	27,752	+1.5
Liberal Democrats	0	0	0	0		12.0	23,935	+2.7
Green	0	0	1	-1		11.6	23,142	-4.8
Women's Equality	0	0	0	0		1.1	2,158	New
TUSC	0	0	0	0		0.3	483	-1.6
Duma Polska	0	0	0	0		0.2	392	New
Independent	0	0	0	0		0.2	348	N/A
UKIP	0	0	0	0		0.2	343	-2.5
CPA	0	0	0	0		0.1	281	New
Democrats and Veterans	0	0	0	0		0.1	221	New
Alliance for Green Socialism	0	0	0	0		0.1	209	New
BNP	0	0	0	0		0.0	98	New

== Results by ward ==
Asterisk denotes the sitting councillor.

=== Bellingham ===
Bellingham (3)
Party	Candidate	Votes	%	±%
Labour Co-op	Alan Hall*	1,810	60.2	+3.1
Labour Co-op	Sue Hordijenko	1,772	58.9	+5.8
Labour Co-op	Jacq Paschoud*	1,598	53.1	+5.8
Conservative	Andrew Chang	500	16.6	+3.0
Conservative	Alex Gill	461	15.3	+2.6
Conservative	Tom Spier	451	15.0	+3.5
Green	Mary McGeown	401	13.3	+3.0
Liberal Democrats	Peter George	246	8.2	+2.1
Liberal Democrats	Sarah Morris	238	7.9	+3.2
Liberal Democrats	Kate Polling	227	7.5	+3.0
CPA	Katherine Hortense	151	5.0	N/A
Majority				
Turnout			29	
Labour Co-op hold		Swing		
Labour Co-op hold		Swing		
Labour Co-op hold		Swing		

=== Blackheath ===
Blackheath (3)
Party	Candidate	Votes	%	±%
Labour	Juliet Campbell	2,069	46.8	+14.9
Labour	Kevin Bonavia	1,978	44.8	+3.4
Labour	Amanda De Ryk	1,855	42.0	+3.5
Liberal Democrats	Chris Maines	1,117	25.3	+4.4
Liberal Democrats	Nadya Phoenix	889	20.1	+3.1
Conservative	Nicola Peers	884	20.0	−3.5
Conservative	Simon Nundy	882	20.0	−2.8
Conservative	Jonathan Lee	881	19.9	+0.5
Green	Abigail Phillips	862	19.5	+6.9
Liberal Democrats	Anthony Crowther	810	18.3	+3.9
Majority				
Turnout			44	
Labour hold		Swing		
Labour hold		Swing		
Labour hold		Swing		

=== Brockley ===
John Coughlin was the sole Opposition councillor (2014-2018) and subsequently lost his seat.

Brockley (3)
Party	Candidate	Votes	%	±%
Labour	Sophie McGeevor	2,606	55.3	+14.4
Labour	Jimi Adefiranye	2,448	51.9	+6.0
Labour	Stephen Penfold	2,040	43.3	+11.1
Green	John Coughlin	1,457	30.9	−2.4
Green	Clare Lorraine	1,260	26.7	−0.8
Green	Harvir Sangha	911	19.3	−6.3
Women's Equality	Kate Vang	542	11.5	N/A
Liberal Democrats	Marcus Mayers	322	6.8	+0.6
Conservative	Fraser Archer	318	6.7	−2.0
Conservative	John O'Connor	302	6.4	−1.7
Liberal Democrats	Brenda Murray	295	6.3	+2.4
Conservative	Christopher Wilford	242	5.1	−2.4
Liberal Democrats	Martin Passande	202	4.3	+0.8
TUSC	Ellen Peers	74	1.6	−2.4
Majority				
Turnout			38	
Labour hold		Swing		
Labour hold		Swing		
Labour gain from Green		Swing		

=== Catford South ===
In June 2019, Smith left the Labour Party in opposition to Jeremy Corbyn, the then Leader of the party. He now sits as an independent.

Catford South (3)
Party	Candidate	Votes	%	±%
Labour	Skip Amrani	2,548	61.3	+8.7
Labour	Eva Stamirowski	2,444	58.8	+11.6
Labour	Alan Smith	2,204	53.0	+5.2
Green	Rosie Downes	906	21.8	+8.6
Conservative	Mark Hanlon	638	15.3	+0.4
Conservative	Adam Lake	540	13.0	±0.0
Liberal Democrats	Diana Cashin	526	12.6	+7.6
Conservative	Sylbourne Sydial	516	10.0	−1.5
Liberal Democrats	Julian Hawkins	330	7.9	+3.9
Liberal Democrats	Peter Hoskin	266	6.4	+2.9
Majority				
Turnout			39	
Labour hold		Swing		
Labour hold		Swing		
Labour hold		Swing		

=== Crofton Park ===
Crofton Park (3)
Party	Candidate	Votes	%	±%
Labour	Tauseef Anwar	2,445	53.6	+13.6
Labour	Pauline Morrison	2,418	53.0	+8.0
Labour	Chris Barnham	2,353	51.6	+4.6
Green	Alison Pick	916	20.1	+0.6
Green	Julia Rendall	817	17.9	−3.7
Green	Alan Greenwood	708	15.5	−2.7
Liberal Democrats	Rosalind Huish	613	13.4	+5.5
Liberal Democrats	Bobby Dean	607	13.3	+8.1
Liberal Democrats	Bunmi Wajero	513	11.3	+7.9
Conservative	James Clark	466	10.2	−1.2
Conservative	Scott Bell	455	10.0	+1.4
Conservative	Karen Sunderland	408	9.0	+0.5
Majority				
Turnout			42	
Labour hold		Swing		
Labour hold		Swing		
Labour hold		Swing		

=== Downham ===
Downham (3)
Party	Candidate	Votes	%	±%
Labour	Andre Bourne	1,838	59.5	+22.0
Labour	Coral Howard	1,594	51.6	+15.5
Labour	Timi Ogunbadewa	1,572	50.9	+22.6
Conservative	Alexandra Burr	544	17.6	+9.2
Conservative	David Davis	487	15.8	+6.0
Conservative	Adam Thomas	390	12.6	+5.1
Liberal Democrats	Danny Dignan	350	11.3	−15.2
Green	Hanna Hewins	313	10.1	+2.6
Liberal Democrats	Joan Labrom	241	7.8	−11.6
UKIP	Paul Oakley	180	5.8	−17.6
Liberal Democrats	Simon Thorley	117	3.8	−15.0
BNP	Tess Culnane	98	3.2	+0.1
Democrats and Veterans	Will Donnelly	86	2.8	N/A
Democrats and Veterans	Matt Jenkins	75	2.4	N/A
Democrats and Veterans	Massimo Dimambro	60	1.9	−21.5
Majority				
Turnout			30	
Labour hold		Swing		
Labour hold		Swing		
Labour hold		Swing		

=== Evelyn ===
Evelyn (3)
Party	Candidate	Votes	%	±%
Labour	Caroline Kalu	2,278	59.4	+4.9
Labour	Alex Feis-Bryce	2,257	58.9	+9.7
Labour	Silvana Kelleher	2,221	57.9	+13.5
Green	James Braun	680	17.7	+2.3
Liberal Democrats	Marie Belsey	406	10.6	+1.5
Conservative	Oliver Kay	395	10.3	N/A
Independent	Joyce Jacca	348	9.1	N/A
Conservative	Robert Taylor	346	9.0	N/A
Conservative	Lynn Walker	309	8.1	N/A
Liberal Democrats	Peter Wells	308	8.0	+2.2
Liberal Democrats	Gary Williams	307	8.0	+2.5
Duma Polska	Anna Wasylkiewicz	53	1.4	N/A
Majority				
Turnout			30	
Labour hold		Swing		
Labour hold		Swing		
Labour hold		Swing		

=== Forest Hill ===
Forest Hill (3)
Party	Candidate	Votes	%	±%
Labour	Sophie Davis	2,308	51.5	+9.2
Labour	Leo Gibbons	2,146	47.9	+9.1
Labour	Peter Bernards	2,079	46.4	+10.3
Liberal Democrats	Ed Veasey	923	20.6	−4.7
Liberal Democrats	Margot Wilson	906	20.2	+4.2
Liberal Democrats	Mark Bennett	868	19.4	+2.9
Green	Martin Cox	604	13.5	−2.2
Green	Keith Chambers	572	12.8	−2.5
Conservative	Liam Gilgar	569	12.7	+0.6
Conservative	Eleanor Reader-Moore	538	12.0	+0.6
Green	Mark Cunningham	521	11.6	−0.7
Conservative	Andrew McMurtrie	509	11.4	+1.5
Majority				
Turnout			42	
Labour hold		Swing		
Labour hold		Swing		
Labour hold		Swing		

=== Grove Park ===
Grove Park (3)
Party	Candidate	Votes	%	±%
Labour	Suzannah Clarke	2,094	52.3	+7.2
Labour	Hilary Moore	1,808	45.2	+11.7
Labour	Colin Elliott	1,661	41.5	+9.7
Conservative	Ross Archer	1,390	34.7	+14.2
Conservative	Ethan Brooks	1,164	29.1	+2.1
Conservative	Karen Lowe	1,076	26.9	+9.1
Green	Petroc Ap Seisyllt	511	12.8	+2.1
Liberal Democrats	Linda Hawkins	303	7.6	+2.8
Liberal Democrats	Ben Brooks	278	6.9	+2.8
UKIP	Peter Lello	163	4.1	−17.7
Liberal Democrats	Peter Ramrayka	163	4.1	+0.6
Majority				
Turnout			38	
Labour hold		Swing		
Labour hold		Swing		
Labour hold		Swing		

=== Ladywell ===
Ladywell (3)
Party	Candidate	Votes	%	±%
Labour	Liz Johnston-Franklin	2,420	53.5	+9.7
Labour	Carl Handley	2,125	47.0	+5.4
Labour	Bill Brown	1,850	40.9	−4.7
Green	Corin Ashwell	1,395	30.8	+0.9
Women's Equality	Rebecca Manson Jones	1,188	26.3	N/A
Green	John Keidan	989	21.9	−5.4
Green	Matt Barker	898	19.9	−4.5
Liberal Democrats	Deborah Hudson	411	9.1	+3.7
Conservative	Catriona Archer	334	7.4	−0.7
Liberal Democrats	Richard Hebditch	290	6.4	+2.0
Liberal Democrats	Tony Lloyd	275	6.1	+2.6
Conservative	Camilla Kennedy Harper	257	5.7	−2.2
Conservative	Edmund Stewart	215	4.8	−2.2
Majority				
Turnout			45	
Labour hold		Swing		
Labour hold		Swing		
Labour hold		Swing		

=== Lee Green ===
Lee Green (3)
Party	Candidate	Votes	%	±%
Labour	Octavia Holland	2,302	52.7	+10.2
Labour	Jim Mallory	2,184	50.0	+3.5
Labour	James Rathbone	1,850	42.4	+7.9
Green	Caroline Sandes	951	21.8	+7.9
Liberal Democrats	Grace Calder	895	20.5	+1.4
Conservative	Caroline Attfield	819	18.8	+4.1
Liberal Democrats	Jonathan Bostock	742	17.0	−0.1
Conservative	Matthew Arawwawala	712	16.3	+1.6
Liberal Democrats	Mark Rochell	647	14.8	+2.6
Conservative	Sam Thurgood	624	14.3	+2.6
CPA	Maureen Martin	130	3.0	N/A
Majority				
Turnout			43	
Labour hold		Swing		
Labour hold		Swing		
Labour hold		Swing		

=== Lewisham Central ===
Lewisham Central (3)
Party	Candidate	Votes	%	±%
Labour	Aisling Gallagher	2,821	56.4	+1.3
Labour	Patrick Codd	2,776	55.5	+2.6
Labour	Joani Reid	2,607	52.2	+6.5
Green	Eugenia Barnett	776	15.5	+1.6
Liberal Democrats	Katie Anderson	653	13.1	+6.0
Green	Claire Cooper	642	12.8	−0.8
Conservative	Andrew Hughes	619	12.4	−0.4
Conservative	Joshua O'Connor	490	9.8	+0.6
Liberal Democrats	David Williamson	485	9.7	+4.8
Conservative	Gareth Milner	478	9.6	+0.5
Liberal Democrats	Marc Postle	468	9.4	+4.7
Women's Equality	Mandu Reid	428	8.6	N/A
Green	Charles Guille	415	8.3	−0.7
Majority				
Turnout			35	
Labour hold		Swing		
Labour hold		Swing		
Labour hold		Swing		

=== New Cross ===
New Cross (3)
Party	Candidate	Votes	%	±%
Labour Co-op	Brenda Dacres	2,808	71.1	+19.9
Labour Co-op	Joe Dromey	2,616	66.3	+19.9
Labour Co-op	Paul Maslin	2,100	53.2	+16.3
Green	Andrea Carey Fuller	968	24.5	+7.1
Conservative	Alatise Solape	340	8.6	+1.5
Liberal Democrats	Jerry Barnett	319	8.1	+3.3
Conservative	Isaac Sakey	315	8.0	+1.7
Conservative	Brian Chipps	261	6.6	N/A
Liberal Democrats	Averil Leimon	257	6.5	+3.5
Liberal Democrats	Norval Scott	236	6.0	+3.7
Majority				
Turnout				
Labour Co-op hold		Swing		
Labour Co-op hold		Swing		
Labour Co-op hold		Swing		

=== Perry Vale ===
Perry Vale (3)
Party	Candidate	Votes	%	±%
Labour Co-op	Susan Wise	2,581	58.2	+13.6
Labour Co-op	John Pashoud	2,548	57.5	+6.7
Labour Co-op	Sakina Sheikh	2,327	52.5	+7.5
Green	Ion Catuneanu	1,089	24.6	+7.2
Liberal Democrats	Alex Feakes	755	17.0	+10.5
Conservative	Martin Coombs	585	13.2	−1.3
Liberal Democrats	Katja Sarmiento-Mirwaldt	556	12.5	+6.5
Conservative	Bettina Lawrence	497	11.2	−1.1
Liberal Democrats	Bill Town	457	10.3	+5.1
Conservative	Ross French	430	9.7	−1.6
Majority				
Turnout			40	
Labour Co-op hold		Swing		
Labour Co-op hold		Swing		
Labour Co-op hold		Swing		

=== Rushey Green ===
Rushey Green (3)
Party	Candidate	Votes	%	±%
Labour Co-op	Louise Krupski	2,285	63.4	+8.9
Labour Co-op	James-J Walsh	2,063	57.2	+19.1
Labour Co-op	John Muldoon	2,041	56.6	+12.2
Green	Cath Miller	529	14.7	−0.6
Green	Mike Keogh	429	11.9	−2.4
Conservative	Ian Stell	362	10.0	−0.1
Liberal Democrats	Heidi Degen	339	9.4	+4.1
Duma Polska	Jolanta Gut-Nidecka	339	9.4	N/A
Conservative	John Sweeney	280	7.8	±0.0
Conservative	Neil Weatherall	275	7.6	N/A
Liberal Democrats	George Crozier	253	7.0	+2.4
TUSC	Tracy Edwards	253	7.0	N/A
Liberal Democrats	Andrew McIlwraith	233	6.5	+3.0
Green	Matt Hawkins	109	3.0	−7.2
TUSC	Andy Beadle	82	2.3	N/A
TUSC	Steven Rumney	74	2.1	N/A
Majority				
Turnout			35	
Labour Co-op hold		Swing		
Labour Co-op hold		Swing		
Labour Co-op hold		Swing		

=== Sydenham ===
Sydenham (3)
Party	Candidate	Votes	%	±%
Labour Co-op	Chris Best	2,757	62.2	+7.8
Labour Co-op	Tom Copley	2,291	51.7	+12.6
Labour Co-op	Liam Curran	2,226	50.2	+10.6
Green	Matt Freake	1,048	23.6	+8.3
Liberal Democrats	Jane Russell	737	16.6	+10.3
Conservative	Anthony Bays	725	16.3	−0.6
Conservative	Raymond Squires	686	15.5	−0.6
Conservative	William Stevenson	609	13.7	+0.6
Liberal Democrats	Arthur Peake	427	9.6	+4.3
Liberal Democrats	Owen Sharp	285	6.4	+3.7
Majority				
Turnout			39	
Labour Co-op hold		Swing		
Labour Co-op hold		Swing		
Labour Co-op hold		Swing		

=== Telegraph Hill ===
Telegraph Hill (3)
Party	Candidate	Votes	%	±%
Labour	Joan Millbank	3,069	68.8	+18.7
Labour	Paul Bell	2,910	65.2	+17.8
Labour	Luke Sorba	2,643	59.2	+20.4
Green	Jess Wiles	1,168	26.2	+8.9
Liberal Democrats	Cheryl Baum	443	9.9	+6.3
Liberal Democrats	Ade Fatukasi	362	8.1	+4.7
Liberal Democrats	Jem Smith	316	7.1	+4.5
Conservative	Ben Blackmore	287	6.4	±0.0
Conservative	Rachel Joseph	273	6.1	+0.5
Conservative	Tristram Kennedy Harper	262	5.9	+1.2
Alliance for Green Socialism	John Lloyd	209	4.7	N/A
Majority				
Turnout			39	
Labour hold		Swing		
Labour hold		Swing		
Labour hold		Swing		

=== Whitefoot ===
Whitefoot (3)
Party	Candidate	Votes	%	±%
Labour	Janet Daby	2,094	65.8	+12.2
Labour	Mark Ingleby	1,947	61.2	+13.4
Labour	Jonathan Slater	1,578	49.6	+7.8
Conservative	Peter Buffham	519	16.3	+3.7
Conservative	Andrew Lee	474	14.9	+4.8
Conservative	Roger Lewis	383	12.0	N/A
Liberal Democrats	Janet Hurst	324	10.2	+1.1
Green	Gerry Howell	297	9.3	+2.5
Liberal Democrats	Mark Morris	236	7.4	−2.0
Liberal Democrats	Vijay Naidu	163	5.1	−0.2
Majority				
Turnout			32	
Labour hold		Swing		
Labour hold		Swing		
Labour hold		Swing		

== 2018-2022 by-elections ==
Evelyn by-election 2019
Party	Candidate	Votes	%	±%
Labour	Lionel Openshaw	1,681	52.7	▼6.2
Green	James Braun	702	22.0	▲4.3
Conservative	Eleanor Reader-Moore	231	7.2	▼3.1
Liberal Democrats	Bunmi Wajero	200	6.3	▼4.3
People Before Profit	Joyce Jacca	151	4.7	New
UKIP	Dick Day	140	4.4	New
Women's Equality	Nicke Adebowale	71	2.2	New
Democrats and Veterans	Matt Jenkins	13	0.4	New
Labour hold		Swing		

The by-election was called following the resignation of Councillor Alex Feis-Bryce.

Whitefoot by-election 2019
Party	Candidate	Votes	%	±%
Labour	Kim Powell	1,314	53.0	▼12.8
Liberal Democrats	Max Brockbank	514	20.7	▲10.5
Conservative	Ben Blackmore	313	12.6	▼3.7
People Before Profit	Gwenton Sloley	218	8.8	New
CPA	Katherine Hortense	52	2.1	New
Women's Equality	Cairis Grant-Hickey	41	1.7	New
Democrats and Veterans	Massimo Dimambro	28	1.1	New
Labour hold		Swing		

The by-election was called following the resignation of Councillor Janet Daby.

New Cross by-election 6 May 2021
Party	Candidate	Votes	%	±%
Labour	Samantha Latouche	3,038	61.1	▼2.2
Green	Andrea Carey Fuller	862	17.3	▲4.5
Conservative	Chris Wilford	526	10.6	▲2.5
People Before Profit	Dennis Sloley	219	4.3	New
Liberal Democrats	Bunmi Wajero	214	4.3	▼2.9
TUSC	Andy Beadle	111	3.0	New
Labour hold		Swing		
