= Forest Hill (ward) =

Electoral ward in London, England

- Electoral ward for the Lewisham London Borough Council
- Forest Hill ward boundaries since 2022
- Borough: Lewisham
- County: Greater London
- Population: 15,174 (2021) (Note: 2021 Census data reported for 2022 ward boundaries)
- Electorate: 10,903 (2022)
- Major settlements: Forest Hill
- Area: 1.828 square kilometres (0.706 sq mi)

Current electoral ward
- Created: 1965
- Number of members: 1965–1978: 3; 1978–2002: 2; 2002–present: 3
- Councillors: Peter Bernards; Billy Harding; Vacancy
- ONS code: 00AZGL (2002–2022)
- GSS code: E05000444 (2002–2022); E05013722 (2022–present)

Forest Hill is an electoral ward in the London Borough of Lewisham. The ward has existed since the creation of the borough on 1 April 1965 and was first used in the 1964 elections. It returns councillors to Lewisham London Borough Council. The ward was redrawn in 1978 and 2002 with completely new territory. The number of councillors was reduced from three to two between 1978 and 2002.

== List of councillors ==
Election	Councillors		
2022	Peter Bernards (Labour)	Sophie Davis (Labour)	Billy Harding (Labour)

== Lewisham council elections since 2022 ==
There was a revision in ward boundaries in Lewisham in 2022. The boundaries of the Forest Hill ward were unchanged.

=== 2026 election ===
Sophie Davis resigned in January 2026, with the by-election deferred until May 2026. (Note: Casual vacancies occurring within six months of scheduled elections are not filled.)

=== 2022 election ===
The election took place on 5 May 2022.

2022 Lewisham London Borough Council election: Forest Hill (3)
Party	Candidate	Votes	%	±%
Labour	Sophie Davis	2,395	61.4	
Labour	Peter Bernards	2,044	52.4	
Labour	Billy Harding	1,797	46.1	
Green	Julia Rendall	1,156	29.6	
Green	Martin Cox	840	21.5	
Green	Mike Peters	757	19.4	
Liberal Democrats	Mark Bennett	535	13.7	
Liberal Democrats	John Russell	496	12.7	
Conservative	Anthony Bays	480	12.3	
Liberal Democrats	Krish Brown	458	11.7	
Conservative	Aimee Henderson	401	10.3	
Conservative	Paul Mahoney	340	8.7	
Turnout			35.4	
Labour hold		Swing		
Labour hold		Swing		
Labour hold		Swing		

== 2002–2022 Lewisham council elections ==
Forest Hill ward boundaries from 2002 to 2022

There was a revision in ward boundaries in Lewisham in 2002. The new Forest Hill ward contained none of the territory of the previous ward and was a completely new constituency.

=== 2018 election ===
The election took place on 3 May 2018.

2018 Lewisham London Borough Council election: Forest Hill (3)
Party	Candidate	Votes	%	±%
Labour	Sophie Davis	2,308	51.5	+9.2
Labour	Leo Gibbons	2,146	47.9	+9.1
Labour	Peter Bernards	2,079	46.4	+10.3
Liberal Democrats	Ed Veasey	923	20.6	−4.7
Liberal Democrats	Margot Wilson	906	20.2	+4.2
Liberal Democrats	Mark Bennett	868	19.4	+2.9
Green	Martin Cox	604	13.5	−2.2
Green	Keith Chambers	572	12.8	−2.5
Conservative	Liam Gilgar	569	12.7	+0.6
Conservative	Eleanor Reader-Moore	538	12.0	+0.6
Green	Mark Cunningham	521	11.6	−0.7
Conservative	Andrew McMurtrie	509	11.4	+1.5
Majority				
Turnout			42	
Labour hold		Swing		
Labour hold		Swing		
Labour hold		Swing		

=== 2014 election ===
The election took place on 22 May 2014.

2014 Lewisham London Borough Council election: Forest Hill (3)
Party	Candidate	Votes	%	±%
Labour	Milena Hilton	1,869	42.3	+9.5
Labour	Peter Bernards	1,718	38.8	+8.1
Labour	Paul Upex	1,595	36.1	+5.5
Liberal Democrats	Alexander Feakes	1,118	25.3	−22.6
Liberal Democrats	George Crozier	732	16.5	−20.1
Liberal Democrats	Margot Wilson	707	16.0	−14.7
Green	Oliver Taylor	693	15.7	+4.9
Green	Peter Jones	676	15.3	+7.4
Green	Helen Thompson	545	12.3	+5.8
Conservative	Christopher Ferguson	537	12.1	−4.4
Conservative	Raymond Squires	506	11.4	−7.8
Conservative	Paul Tebble	437	9.9	−3.7
People Before Profit	Ruth Cain	378	8.5	+3.2
UKIP	Paul Oakley	378	8.5	N/A
Turnout		4,423	41.5	
Labour gain from Liberal Democrats		Swing		
Labour gain from Liberal Democrats		Swing		
Labour hold		Swing		

=== 2010 election ===
The election on 6 May 2010 took place on the same day as the United Kingdom general election.

2010 Lewisham London Borough Council election: Forest Hill (3)
Party	Candidate	Votes	%	±%
Liberal Democrats	Alex Feakes	3,144	47.9	
Liberal Democrats	Philip Peake	2,405	36.6	
Labour	Anne Affiku	2,154	32.8	
Labour	Jacqueline Paschoud	2,019	30.7	
Liberal Democrats	John Russell	2,014	30.7	
Labour	Patrick McMorrow	2,009	30.6	
Conservative	Raymond Squires	1,262	19.2	
Conservative	André Bourne	1,084	16.5	
Conservative	Kenneth Lemeh	893	13.6	
Green	Anne Scott	712	10.8	
Green	Ronald Bullman	522	7.9	
Green	Alexandra Rae	424	6.5	
People Before Profit	Nathalia Richards	345	5.3	
Turnout		6,570	64.4	
Liberal Democrats hold		Swing		
Liberal Democrats hold		Swing		
Labour gain from Liberal Democrats		Swing		

=== 2006 election ===
The election took place on 4 May 2006.

2006 Lewisham London Borough Council election: Forest Hill (3)
Party	Candidate	Votes	%	±%
Liberal Democrats	Alexander Feakes	1,439	39.7	
Liberal Democrats	Arthur Peake	1,434		
Liberal Democrats	John Russell	1,176		
Labour	Katherine Holtman	846	23.4	
Labour	David Whiting	754		
Labour	David Michael	719		
Green	Regina Purrmann	631	17.4	
Conservative	David Hart	536	14.8	
Conservative	Raymond Squires	436		
Conservative	Neil Tritschler	410		
Lewisham Peoples Alliance	Sinna Mani	169	4.7	
Turnout			32.9	
Liberal Democrats gain from Labour		Swing		
Liberal Democrats hold		Swing		
Liberal Democrats gain from Labour		Swing		

=== 2005 by-election ===
The by-election took place on 17 March 2005.

2005 Forest Hill by-election
Party	Candidate	Votes	%	±%
Liberal Democrats	Arthur Peake	1,011		
Labour	Erica Ballmann	789		
Conservative	Raymond Squires	522		
Turnout				
Liberal Democrats gain from Labour		Swing		

=== 2002 election ===
The election took place on 2 May 2002.

2002 Lewisham London Borough Council election: Forest Hill (3)
Party	Candidate	Votes	%	±%
Labour	Joseph Dawson	1,406		
Labour	Susan Wise	1,308		
Labour	David Whiting	1,231		
Conservative	Raymond Squires	949		
Green	Regina Purrmann	932		
Liberal Democrats	Brenda Pooley	924		
Conservative	Neil Tritschler	832		
Conservative	Raymond Woolford	771		
Turnout				
Labour win (new seat)				
Labour win (new seat)				
Labour win (new seat)				

== 1978–2002 Lewisham council elections ==
Forest Hill ward boundaries from 1978 to 2002

There was a revision of ward boundaries in Lewisham in 1978. The new Forest Hill ward contained none of the territory of the previous ward and was a completely new constituency.

=== 1998 election ===
The election on 7 May 1998 took place on the same day as the 1998 Greater London Authority referendum.

1998 Lewisham London Borough Council election: Forest Hill (2)
Party	Candidate	Votes	%	±%
Labour	Jacqueline Addison	1,029	73.49	▲0.91
Labour	John Paschoud	956		
Conservative	Gaenor Elliott	360	26.51	▼0.91
Conservative	Frederick Porter	356		
Registered electors		4,964		▼25
Turnout		1,489	30.00	▼10.89
Rejected ballots		21	1.41	▲0.77
Labour hold				
Labour hold				

=== 1994 election ===
The election took place on 5 May 1994.

1994 Lewisham London Borough Council election: Forest Hill (2)
Party	Candidate	Votes	%	±%
Labour	Jacqueline Addison	1,430	72.58	▲8.92
Labour	John Paschoud	1,295		
Conservative	Margaret Ball	546	27.42	▼8.92
Conservative	Margaret Punyer	484		
Registered electors		4,989		▼271
Turnout		2,040	40.89	▼3.44
Rejected ballots		13	0.64	▲0.13
Labour hold		Swing		
Labour hold		Swing		

=== 1990 election ===
The election took place on 3 May 1990.

1990 Lewisham London Borough Council election: Forest Hill (2)
Party	Candidate	Votes	%	±%
Labour	James Dowd	1,350		
Labour	Jacqueline Addison	1,330		
Conservative	Michael Woolacott	809		
Conservative	Andrew Mnguni	720		
Turnout				
Labour hold		Swing		
Labour hold		Swing		

=== 1986 election ===
The election took place on 8 May 1986.

1982 Lewisham London Borough Council election: Forest Hill (2)
Party	Candidate	Votes	%	±%
Labour	Jacqueline Addison	1,145		
Labour	Graeme Sandell	1,029		
Conservative	Rosemary D'Cruze	756		
Conservative	Goggi Bestavachvili	751		
Alliance (SDP)	Margaret Bingham	316		
Alliance (Liberal)	Peter Vickers	275		
Turnout				
Labour hold		Swing		
Labour hold		Swing		

=== 1982 election ===
The election took place on 6 May 1982.

1982 Lewisham London Borough Council election: Forest Hill (2)
Party	Candidate	Votes	%	±%
Labour	Jacqueline Addison	1,072		
Labour	Christopher Leeds	996		
Conservative	Richard Harris	823		
Conservative	Robert Senft	724		
Alliance (Liberal)	Frederick Brown	507		
Alliance (SDP)	John McDonald	479		
Turnout				
Labour hold		Swing		
Labour hold		Swing		

=== 1978 election ===
The election took place on 4 May 1978.

1990 Lewisham London Borough Council election: Forest Hill (2)
Party	Candidate	Votes	%	±%
Labour	Jacqueline Addison	1,233		
Labour	Anthony Emerson	1,229		
Conservative	Brian Robson	1,050		
Conservative	George Daters	1,001		
British United Party	Edward Arthurton	111		
British United Party	Malcolm Dixon	102		
Turnout				
Labour win (new seat)				
Labour win (new seat)				

== 1964–1978 Lewisham council elections ==
External image
- Map showing Forest Hill ward boundaries from 1965 to 1978

=== 1974 election ===
The election took place on 2 May 1974.

1974 Lewisham London Borough Council election: Forest Hill (3)
Party	Candidate	Votes	%	±%
Conservative	Alan Humble	2,112		
Conservative	Rose Bartlett	2,074		
Conservative	Shirley Cannon	2,058		
Labour	William Simson	1,780		
Labour	B. Lake	1,690		
Labour	M. Toomey	1,668		
Liberal	A. Hunter	392		
Liberal	R. Murphy	368		
Liberal	T. Minahan	367		
Turnout				
Conservative gain from Labour		Swing		
Conservative gain from Labour		Swing		
Conservative gain from Labour		Swing		

=== 1971 election ===
The election took place on 13 May 1971.

1971 Lewisham London Borough Council election: Forest Hill (3)
Party	Candidate	Votes	%	±%
Labour	R. Mooney	2,484	52.1	+27.8
Labour	William Simson	2,443		
Labour	K. Thomas	2,412		
Conservative	Rose Bartlett	2,284	47.9	−15.5
Conservative	N. Banks	2,262		
Conservative	D. Dear	2,256		
Turnout			46.0	+2.9
Registered electors		10,565		
Labour gain from Conservative		Swing		
Labour gain from Conservative		Swing		
Labour gain from Conservative		Swing		

=== 1968 election ===
The election took place on 9 May 1968.

1968 Lewisham London Borough Council election: Forest Hill (3)
Party	Candidate	Votes	%	±%
Conservative	Rose Bartlett	2,758	63.4	+20.3
Conservative	N. Banks	2,756		
Conservative	C. Costello	2,712		
Labour	R. Mooney	1,059	24.3	−19.0
Labour	Roger Godsiff	1,024		
Labour	R. White	999		
Liberal	H. Beecher	422	9.7	−2.3
Liberal	F. Shine	388		
Liberal	B. Small	373		
Communist	R. Bowden	111	2.6	+1.0
Turnout			43.1	+1.1
Registered electors		9,968		
Conservative gain from Labour		Swing		
Conservative gain from Labour		Swing		
Conservative hold		Swing		

=== 1964 election ===
The election took place on 7 May 1964.

1964 Lewisham London Borough Council election: Forest Hill (3)
Party	Candidate	Votes	%	±%
Labour	R. Mooney	1,925	43.3	N/A
Labour	H. Brett	1,921		N/A
Conservative	Rose Bartlett	1,917	43.1	N/A
Labour	Harry West	1,911		N/A
Conservative	C. Costello	1,907		N/A
Conservative	N. Banks	1,895		N/A
Liberal	H. Beecher	534	12.0	N/A
Liberal	B. Small	521		N/A
Liberal	L. Marchant	486		N/A
Communist	R. Bowden	69	1.6	N/A
Turnout		4,429	42.0	N/A
Registered electors		10,555		
Labour win (new seat)				
Labour win (new seat)				
Conservative win (new seat)				
