= Deptford (ward) =

- Electoral ward for the Lewisham London Borough Council
- Deptford ward boundaries since 2022
- Borough: Lewisham
- County: Greater London
- Population: 17,002 (2021) (Note: 2021 Census data reported for 2022 ward boundaries)
- Electorate: 11,090 (2022)
- Area: 1.416 square kilometres (0.547 sq mi)

Current electoral ward
- Created: 1965–1978 (first creation); 2022 (second creation)
- Councillors: 3
- Created from: Brockley, Evelyn and New Cross in 2022
- GSS code: E05013719 (2022–present)

Deptford is an electoral ward in the London Borough of Lewisham. The ward was originally created in 1965 and abolished in 1978. It was created again in 2022. It returns three councillors to Lewisham London Borough Council.

== Lewisham council elections since 2022 ==
=== 2024 by-election ===
The by-election was held on 2 May 2024, following Brenda Dacres winning the 2024 Lewisham mayoral by-election. It took place on the same day as the 2024 London mayoral election, the 2024 London Assembly election and 14 other borough council by-elections across London.

2024 Deptford by-election
| Party | Candidate | Votes | % | ±% |
|---|---|---|---|---|
| Labour | David Walker | 2,642 | | |
| Green | Adam Pugh | 944 | | |
| Liberal Democrats | Jean Branch | 221 | | |
| Independent | Tan Bui | 124 | | |
| Conservative | Hugh Rees-Beaumont | 69 | | |
| Majority | | | | |
| Turnout | | | | |
| Labour hold | | Swing | | |

=== 2023 by-election ===
The by-election was held on 9 November 2023, following the resignation of Stephen Hayes.

2023 Deptford by-election
| Party | Candidate | Votes | % | ±% |
|---|---|---|---|---|
| Labour | Dawn Atkinson | 1,596 | 71.2 | +17.7 |
| Green | Tim Crossley | 382 | 17.0 | −1.9 |
| Conservative | Siama Qadar | 174 | 7.8 | −0.4 |
| Liberal Democrats | Alan Harding | 91 | 4.1 | −2.7 |
| Majority | | 1,214 | 54.1 | |
| Turnout | | 2,243 | | |
| Labour hold | | Swing | | |

=== 2022 election ===
The election took place on 5 May 2022.

2022 Lewisham London Borough Council election: Deptford
| Party | Candidate | Votes | % | ±% |
|---|---|---|---|---|
| Labour | Brenda Dacres | 2,095 | 68.6 | |
| Labour | Rosie Parry | 1,791 | 58.7 | |
| Labour | Stephen Hayes | 1,632 | 53.5 | |
| Green | Upul Dissanayake | 742 | 24.3 | |
| Green | Sue Gore | 729 | 23.9 | |
| Conservative | Flora Coleman | 323 | 10.6 | |
| TUSC | Andy Beadle | 275 | 9.0 | |
| Liberal Democrats | Janet Hurst | 267 | 8.7 | |
| Liberal Democrats | David Barnes | 241 | 7.9 | |
| Independent | Nik Baksi | 214 | 7.0 | |
| Conservative | Huw Shooter | 213 | 7.0 | |
| Conservative | Adam Thomas | 196 | 6.4 | |
| Liberal Democrats | Mike Steele | 151 | 4.9 | |
| Independent | Jasmine Fulcher | 107 | 3.5 | |
| Independent | Barbara Raymond | 103 | 3.4 | |
| Independent | Clarris Christopher | 77 | 2.5 | |
| Turnout | | | 29.7 | |
| Labour win (new seat) | | | | |
| Labour win (new seat) | | | | |
| Labour win (new seat) | | | | |

== 1964–1978 Lewisham council elections ==
=== 1976 by-election ===
The by-election was held on 1 July 1976.

1976 Deptford by-election
| Party | Candidate | Votes | % | ±% |
|---|---|---|---|---|
| Labour | Peter R. Adams | 968 | | |
| National Party | Malcolm L. Dixon | 580 | | |
| National Front | Richard C. Edmonds | 395 | | |
| Conservative | Gillian B. Elvin | 256 | | |
| Turnout | | | 26.7 | |
| Labour hold | | Swing | | |

=== 1974 election ===
The election took place on 2 May 1974.

1974 Lewisham London Borough Council election: Deptford
| Party | Candidate | Votes | % | ±% |
|---|---|---|---|---|
| | Labour hold | Swing | | |
| | Labour hold | Swing | | |
| | Labour hold | Swing | | |

=== 1971 election ===
The election took place on 13 May 1971.

1971 Lewisham London Borough Council election: Deptford
| Party | Candidate | Votes | % | ±% |
|---|---|---|---|---|
| Labour | Robert Lowe | 846 | 54.5 | −32.4 |
| Labour | A Scutt | 801 | | |
| Labour | T Agambar | 775 | | |
| Conservative | E Green | 505 | 32.5 | +20.3 |
| Conservative | D Nicholls | 496 | | |
| Conservative | S Hickisson | 496 | | |
| Independent | M Collins | 201 | 13.0 | N/A |
| Turnout | | | 22.1 | +1.9 |
| Registered electors | | 6,552 | | |
| Labour hold | | Swing | | |
| Labour hold | | Swing | | |
| Labour hold | | Swing | | |

=== 1968 election ===
The election took place on 9 May 1968.

1968 Lewisham London Borough Council election: Deptford
| Party | Candidate | Votes | % | ±% |
|---|---|---|---|---|
| Labour | Robert Lowe | 846 | 54.5 | −32.4 |
| Labour | A Scutt | 801 | | |
| Labour | T Agambar | 775 | | |
| Conservative | E Green | 505 | 32.5 | +20.3 |
| Conservative | D Nicholls | 496 | | |
| Conservative | S Hickisson | 496 | | |
| Independent | M Collins | 201 | 13.0 | N/A |
| Turnout | | | 22.1 | +1.9 |
| Registered electors | | 6,552 | | |
| Labour hold | | Swing | | |
| Labour hold | | Swing | | |
| Labour hold | | Swing | | |

=== 1964 election ===
The election took place on 7 May 1964.

1964 Lewisham London Borough Council election: Deptford
| Party | Candidate | Votes | % | ±% |
|---|---|---|---|---|
| Labour | F Keep | 1,330 | 87.9 | N/A |
| Labour | Robert Lowe | 1,321 | | N/A |
| Labour | A Scutt | 1,309 | | N/A |
| Conservative | M Lane | 183 | 12.1 | N/A |
| Conservative | E Winterburn | 172 | | N/A |
| Conservative | E Keable | 167 | | N/A |
| Turnout | | 1,538 | 20.3 | N/A |
| Registered electors | | 7,591 | | |
| Labour win (new seat) | | | | |
| Labour win (new seat) | | | | |
| Labour win (new seat) | | | | |
