= 1998 Lewisham London Borough Council election =

1998 local election in England

- 7 May 1998

All 67 seats up for election to Lewisham London Borough Council 34 seats needed for a majority
- Registered: 175,022
- Turnout: 51,905, 29.66% (▼11.32)

	First party	Second party	Third party
Leader	James Mallory	Unknown	Unknown
Party	Labour	Liberal Democrats	Conservative
Leader since	1995	Unknown	Unknown
Leader's seat	Grinling Gibbons	Unknown	Unknown
Last election	63 seats, 64.51%	3 seats, 10.71%	1 seat, 23.70%
Seats before	60	4	1
Seats won	61	4	2
Seat change	▼2	Steady	▲1
Popular vote	74,820	11,223	28,364
Percentage	61.60%	9.24%	23.35%
Swing	▼2.91	▼1.46	▼0.35
Council control before election
Labour
Council control after election
Labour

Elections to Lewisham London Borough Council were held on 7 May 1998. The whole council was up for election for the first time since the 1994 election.

== Background ==
In between the 1994 election and this election there were a total of 6 by-elections to replace councillors who either resigned from their seat or died in office, however only 1 of them resulted in a seat changing parties by going from Liberal Democrats to the Labour Party. In addition to this change there were 3 defections from the Labour party, 2 to the Socialist Party and 1 to the Socialist Labour Party, as well as one Labour seat that became vacant without enough time to hold a by-election. This meant the composition of the council just before the election was as follows:

↓
2	1	60	2	1	1
Socialist	Soc. Lab	Labour	Lib Dem	Conservative	Vacant

== Election result ==
Lewisham local election result 1998
Party	Seats	Gains	Losses	Net gain/loss	Seats %	Votes %	Votes	+/−
Labour	61	1	3	▼2	91.04	61.60	74,820	▼2.91
Liberal Democrats	4	0	0	▲1	5.97	9.24	11,223	▼1.46
Conservative	2	2	1	▲1	2.99	23.35	28,364	▼0.35
Green	0	0	0	Steady	0.00	3.53	4,281	▲2.63
Socialist Labour	0	0	0	Steady	0.00	0.70	855	New
Socialist (GB)	0	0	0	Steady	0.00	0.69	836	New
Ind. Residents	0	0	0	Steady	0.00	0.46	561	New
Ind. Labour Party	0	0	0	Steady	0.00	0.27	328	New
Socialist Alliance	0	0	0	Steady	0.00	0.16	188	New
Total	67						121,456	

After the election the composition of the council was as follows:

↓
61	4	2
Labour	Lib Dem	Conservative

== Ward results ==
(*) - Indicates an incumbent candidate

(†) - Indicates an incumbent candidate standing in a different ward than the one they were elected to

=== Bellingham ===
Bellingham (2)
Party	Candidate	Votes	%	±%
Labour	John O'Shea*	959	62.23	▼16.24
Labour	Ronald Stockbridge*	855		
Conservative	Rosemary Pratt	323	21.44	▼0.09
Conservative	Margaret Smith	302		
Liberal Democrats	Michael Joyce	238	16.33	New
Registered electors		5,845		▼50
Turnout		1,527	26.12	▼12.08
Rejected ballots		8	0.52	▲0.34
Labour hold				
Labour hold				

=== Blackheath ===
Blackheath (2)
Party	Candidate	Votes	%	±%
Labour	Gavin Moore*	957	60.18	▼0.63
Labour	Andrew Brown* (Note: Brown was elected in a by-election trigerred by the resignation of Cllr Nash in 1997)	937		
Conservative	Sally Baden-Hellard	357	21.77	▼3.64
Conservative	Margaret Smith	302		
Liberal Democrats	Neil Stocklley	284	18.05	▲4.27
Registered electors		5,340		▲161
Turnout		1,579	29.57	▼14.59
Rejected ballots		14	0.89	▲0.54
Labour hold				
Labour hold				

=== Blythe Hill ===
Blythe Hill (2)
Party	Candidate	Votes	%	±%
Labour	James Eytle*	1,168	75.88	▲20.16
Labour	Sylvia Scott*	1,144		
Conservative	Bernard Anghelides	383	24.12	▲4.43
Conservative	Richard Wilson	352		
Registered electors		5,213		▲140
Turnout		1,645	31.56	▼10.62
Rejected ballots		16	0.97	▲0.64
Labour hold				
Labour hold				

=== Catford ===
Catford (2)
Party	Candidate	Votes	%	±%
Labour	Martin Taylor	1,052	51.00	▲3.57
Labour	Joseph Burns	956		
Conservative	Derek Stone	693	33.76	▼7.80
Conservative	Nicole Barakat	636		
Liberal Democrats	Owen Griffiths	300	15.24	▲4.23
Registered electors		5,820		▲33
Turnout		2,012	34.57	▼10.67
Rejected ballots		21	1.04	▲0.58
Labour hold				
Labour hold				

=== Churchdown ===
Churchdown (3)
Party	Candidate	Votes	%	±%
Labour	David Bodimeade* (Note: Bodimeade and McGarrigle were both elected in by-elections triggered by the resignations of Cllrs Jordan and Moran respectively in 1997)	1,112	46.67	▼11.19
Labour	Kelly Conway^{†} (Note: Conway was a sitting councillor representing the St Mildred ward)	1,099		
Labour	Kathleen McGarrigle*	1,037		
Liberal Democrats	Joanne Prater	776	32.64	▲13.14
Liberal Democrats	Tim Prater	748		
Liberal Democrats	Cathy Priddey	747		
Conservative	Andrew Lee	503	20.69	▼1.95
Conservative	Ghislaine Greensitt	475		
Conservative	Ronald Lee	462		
Registered electors		7,004		▼105
Turnout		2,479	35.39	▼9.27
Rejected ballots		5	0.20	▲0.04
Labour hold				
Labour hold				
Labour hold				

=== Crofton Park ===
Crofton Park (3)
Party	Candidate	Votes	%	±%
Labour	Fiona Crichlow	1,576	58.58	▼7.43
Labour	Gurbakhsh Garcha*	1,390		
Labour	Ruth Watt^{†} (Note: Watt was a sitting councillor representing the Marlowe ward)	1,380		
Green	Neil Cole-Fennel	530	21.43	New
Conservative	Amanda Graham	523	19.99	▲1.49
Conservative	Matthew Sutcliffe	493		
Conservative	Derek Turner	467		
Registered electors		7,800		▼72
Turnout		2,438	31.26	▼11.52
Rejected ballots		8	0.33	▼0.03
Labour hold				
Labour hold				
Labour hold				

=== Downham ===
Downham (3)
Party	Candidate	Votes	%	±%
Liberal Democrats	Matthew Huntbach*	1,215	60.97	▲3.10
Liberal Democrats	Roy Stevens* (Note: Stevens was originally elected as a Labour politician in a by-election triggered by the resignation of Cllr Morgan-Huws in 1995)	1,212		
Liberal Democrats	Ian Walton	1,097		
Labour	Judith Page	633	31.19	▼3.59
Labour	Mazhar Awan	587		
Labour	Ashtaq Arain^{†} (Note: Arain was a sitting councillor representing the Grove Park ward)	583		
Conservative	Eglantine Draper	170	7.84	▲1.50
Conservative	Peter Vickers	147		
Conservative	Marguerite Westgate	136		
Registered electors		6,364		▲201
Turnout		2,109	33.14	▼17.74
Rejected ballots		12	0.57	▲0.33
Liberal Democrats hold				
Liberal Democrats hold				
Liberal Democrats hold				

=== Drake ===
Drake (3)
Party	Candidate	Votes	%	±%
Labour	Obajimi Adefiranye*	1,081	57.22	▼0.97
Labour	Terence Scott*	1,001		
Labour	Jarman Parmar*	1,000		
Green	Darren Johnson	731	32.27	▲14.63
Green	Hayley Trueman	550		
Green	Dean Walton	457		
Conservative	Lars Almqvist	214	10.51	▲0.89
Conservative	Miriam Makepeace	197		
Conservative	Norah Whetstone	155		
Registered electors		8,045		▲213
Turnout		2,003	24.90	▼8.72
Rejected ballots		17	0.85	▲0.47
Labour hold				
Labour hold				
Labour hold				

=== Evelyn ===
Evelyn (3)
Party	Candidate	Votes	%	±%
Labour	Mark Nottingham*	1,227	79.75	▲10.21
Labour	Mee Ng*	1,084		
Labour	Crada Onuegbu	965		
Conservative	Derek Harris	297	20.25	▲8.58
Conservative	Catherine Eaton	288		
Conservative	Joyce Ockendon	247		
Registered electors		7,596		▲266
Turnout		1,628	21.43	▼9.07
Rejected ballots		28	1.72	▲1.45
Labour hold				
Labour hold				
Labour hold				

=== Forest Hill ===
Forest Hill (2)
Party	Candidate	Votes	%	±%
Labour	Jacqueline Addison*	1,029	73.49	▲0.91
Labour	John Paschoud*	956		
Conservative	Gaenor Elliott	360	26.51	▼0.91
Conservative	Frederick Porter	356		
Registered electors		4,964		▼25
Turnout		1,489	30.00	▼10.89
Rejected ballots		21	1.41	▲0.77
Labour hold				
Labour hold				

=== Grinling Gibbons ===
Grinling Gibbons (3)
Party	Candidate	Votes	%	±%
Labour	David Brown*	1,248	66.86	▲3.18
Labour	Man Mohan*	1,140		
Labour	James Mallory*	1,135		
Green	Sharon Mattey	394	22.43	▲7.30
Conservative	Colin Kendon	195	10.71	▲1.04
Conservative	Ian Mackey	189		
Conservative	Vera Hallett	180		
Registered electors		7,387		▲94
Turnout		1,701	23.03	▼8.01
Rejected ballots		23	1.35	▲0.95
Labour hold				
Labour hold				
Labour hold				

=== Grove Park ===
Grove Park (2)
Party	Candidate	Votes	%	±%
Labour	Donovan Green* (Note: Donovan replaced sitting councillor Macdonald after his resignation in 1995)	764	52.19	▼2.11
Labour	Paul Morris	534		
Conservative	Victor Atkinson	398	31.81	▲0.23
Conservative	Sally Gander	393		
Liberal Democrats	Alan Marshall	227	16.00	▲1.88
Liberal Democrats	Adebayo Adetona	171		
Registered electors		5,232		▲221
Turnout		1,418	27.10	▼16.01
Rejected ballots		8	0.56	▲0.42
Labour hold				
Labour hold				

=== Hither Green ===
Hither Green (3)
Party	Candidate	Votes	%	±%
Labour	Andrew Davies	1,381	58.43	▼13.36
Labour	Paul Fallon	1,244		
Labour	David Wilson*	1,188		
Conservative	John Glen	409	17.77	▲10.44
Conservative	Barry Oiley	382		
Conservative	Hilda Newland	369		
Ind. Residents	Susan Hodge	293	12.90	New
Ind. Residents	Audrey Thurman	268		
Socialist Labour	Anthony Link* (Note: Link was originally elected in 1`994 as a member of the Labour Party, before eventually splitting and joining the more left-wing Socialist Labour Party)	237	10.90	New
Registered electors		8,253		▲69
Turnout		2,280	27.63	▼10.66
Rejected ballots		19	0.83	▲0.06
Labour hold				
Labour hold				
Labour hold				

=== Horniman ===
Horniman (3)
Party	Candidate	Votes	%	±%
Labour	David Whiting^{†} (Note: Whiting was a sitting councillor representing the St Margaret ward)	1,314	46.66	▼0.76
Labour	Kristine Taylor	1,288		
Labour	Susan Wise	1,239		
Conservative	Maureen Marriott	960	33.91	▼3.51
Conservative	Charles Cramp	950		
Conservative	Paul Oakley	881		
Liberal Democrats	Brenda Pooley	533	19.43	▲4.27
Registered electors		7,617		▲160
Turnout		2,709	35.57	▼9.98
Rejected ballots		18	0.66	▲0.51
Labour hold				
Labour hold				
Labour hold				

=== Ladywell ===
Ladywell (3)
Party	Candidate	Votes	%	±%
Labour	Miriam Iloghalu*	1,470	54.04	▼14.73
Labour	Pauline Morrison	1,292		
Labour	Paul Newing*	1,192		
Green	Janet Lawrence	357	14.64	New
Liberal Democrats	John James	307	12.59	▼5.13
Conservative	Carolyn Freeman	274	10.28	▼3.23
Conservative	Nicholas Kent	261		
Socialist Labour	John Mulregan	235	8.45	New
Conservative	Eve Jagusiewicz	217		
Socialist Labour	David Barber	201		
Socialist Labour	Terry Dunn	182		
Registered electors		7,743		▲444
Turnout		2,369	30.60	▼6.24
Rejected ballots		10	0.42	▲0.20
Labour hold				
Labour hold				
Labour hold				

=== Manor Lee ===
Manor Lee (2)
Party	Candidate	Votes	%	±%
Labour	Madeliene Long*	1,236	53.43	▼16.57
Labour	David Sullivan*	1,055		
Liberal Democrats	Patrick McKee	350	16.32	▲5.15
Conservative	William Bellers	334	15.28	▲0.54
Conservative	Beryl Rice	321		
Green	Roebrt Borruso	273	12.73	New
Socialist Alliance	Danny Hammill	48	2.24	New
Registered electors		5,685		▲7
Turnout		1,999	35.16	▼10.97
Rejected ballots		13	0.65	▲0.38
Labour hold				
Labour hold				

=== Marlowe ===
Marlowe (3)
Party	Candidate	Votes	%	±%
Labour	Stephen Padmore*	1,253	57.38	▼10.14
Labour	Annette Gordon	1,152		
Labour	Paul Maslin	1,092		
Ind. Labour Party	O'Caul Edwards-Capone	328	16.15	New
Liberal Democrats	Kate Newman	318	15.65	▼0.01
Conservative	Frank Ward	169	7.56	▼0.85
Conservative	Colin Ockendon	150		
Conservative	Iris Ward	142		
Socialist Alliance	Tobias Abse	66	3.25	New
Registered electors		7,984		▲489
Turnout		1,794	22.47	▼12.45
Rejected ballots		13	0.72	▲0.49
Labour hold				
Labour hold				
Labour hold				

=== Pepys ===
Pepys (3)
Party	Candidate	Votes	%	±%
Labour	Sandra Margaret	1,334	45.35	▼39.22
Labour	Alan Hall* (Note: Hall was elected in a by-election triggered by the death of Cllr Rudd in 1996)	1,204		
Labour	Nicholas Taylor^{†} (Note: Taylor was a sitting councillor representing the Crofton Park ward)	1,096		
Socialist (GB)	Ian Page* (Note: Page was originally elected to represent the ward as a Labour councillor but subsequently joined the Socialist Party)	836	31.30	New
Green	Leandrina Cole-Fennel	441	16.51	New
Conservative	Hilda Wright	189	6.84	▼8.59
Conservative	Anthony Shead	187		
Conservative	James Wright	172		
Registered electors		7,741		▲290
Turnout		2,181	28.17	▼8.68
Rejected ballots		22	1.01	▲0.43
Labour hold				
Labour hold				
Labour hold				

=== Perry Hill ===
Perry Hill (3)
Party	Candidate	Votes	%	±%
Labour	Alan Till*	1,641	71.19	▲14.15
Labour	Colin Hastie*	1,604		
Labour	Michael Holder^{†} (Note: Holder was a sitting councillor representing the St Andrew ward)	1,604		
Conservative	Margaret Ball	679	28.81	▲2.75
Conservative	Huw Shooter	640		
Conservative	Timothy Batterham	628		
Registered electors		8,188		▲154
Turnout		2,522	30.80	▼13.66
Rejected ballots		42	1.67	▲1.39
Labour hold				
Labour hold				
Labour hold				

=== Rushey Green ===
Rushey Green (2)
Party	Candidate	Votes	%	±%
Labour	Peggy Fitzsimmons	1,087	78.08	▲5.44
Labour	Helen Klier	1,065		
Conservative	Charles Bradshaw	251	16.55	▲0.37
Conservative	Roger Pawley	205		
Socialist Alliance	Nicholas Long	74	5.37	New
Registered electors		5,839		▲64
Turnout		1,488	25.48	▼11.92
Rejected ballots		29	1.95	▲1.76
Labour hold				
Labour hold				

=== St Andrew ===
St Andrew (2)
Party	Candidate	Votes	%	±%
Labour	Carl Handley^{†} (Note: Handley was a sitting councillor representing the Catford ward)	1,069	59.76	▼13.88
Labour	Abdeslam Amrani	1,056		
Conservative	Pamela Shooter	463	25.73	▲2.22
Conservative	Robert Light	452		
Liberal Democrats	Roy Robinson	258	14.51	▼11.74
Registered electors		5,836		▲303
Turnout		1,827	31.31	▲16.28
Rejected ballots		13	0.71	▲0.41
Labour hold				
Labour hold				

=== St Margaret ===
St Margaret (2)
Party	Candidate	Votes	%	±%
Labour	Kathryn Donnelly	1,108	56.06	▼4.66
Labour	Jane Hastie	931		
Conservative	Caroline Barnett	464	25.13	▲0.83
Conservative	Esther Finlay	450		
Liberal Democrats	Joan Labrom	342	18.81	▲3.83
Registered electors		5,229		▼37
Turnout		1,812	34.65	▼12.98
Rejected ballots		15	0.83	▲0.71
Labour hold				
Labour hold				

=== St Mildred ===
St Mildred (3)
Party	Candidate	Votes	%	±%
Conservative	Barrie Anderson	1,516	44.17	▲2.24
Conservative	David Britton	1,485		
Labour	William Carlisle^{†} (Note: Carlisle was a sitting councillor representing the Whitefoot ward)	1,335	38.58	▼5.38
Conservative	David McInnes	1,324		
Labour	Ruffo Bravette	1,278		
Labour	Mahmuda Kabir	1,164		
Liberal Democrats	Linda Hawkins	563	17.25	▲3.15
Registered electors		8,785		▲4
Turnout		3,233	36.80	▼12.27
Rejected ballots		14	0.43	▲0.22
Conservative gain from Labour				
Conservative gain from Labour				
Labour gain from Conservative				

=== Sydenham East ===
Sydenham East (3)
Party	Candidate	Votes	%	±%
Labour	Chris Best*	1,321	64.02	▼0.16
Labour	Liam Curran^{†} (Note: Curran was a sitting councillor representing the Sydenham West ward)	1,211		
Labour	Alan Pegg*	1,159		
Conservative	Henriette Dodd	458	21.72	▲0.65
Conservative	Raymond Squires	410		
Conservative	Gwynfor Tippett	384		
Green	Ronald Wilson	274	14.26	▼0.50
Registered electors		7,195		▼24
Turnout		1,980	27.52	▼10.21
Rejected ballots		16	0.81	▲0.48
Labour hold				
Labour hold				
Labour hold				

=== Sydenham West ===
Sydenham West (3)
Party	Candidate	Votes	%	±%
Labour	Philip Mills	1,232	47.66	▼10.15
Labour	Roger Harris	1,204		
Labour	Eva Stamirowski	963		
Conservative	Iona Gillis	570	22.47	▼0.05
Conservative	Angela Bradshaw	554		
Conservative	Douglas Pratt	478		
Liberal Democrats	Mark Bennett	436	18.34	▼1.33
Green	Regina Purrmann	274	11.53	
Registered electors		7,436		▼241
Turnout		2,131	28.66	▼11.75
Rejected ballots		8	0.38	▲0.06
Labour hold				
Labour hold				
Labour hold				

=== Whitefoot ===
Whitefoot (2)
Party	Candidate	Votes	%	±%
Labour	Alan Smith	592	40.59	▼12.43
Liberal Democrats	Carl Kisicki* (Note: Kisicki was originally elected as a Labour councillor but later defected to the Liberal Democrats)	581	38.23	▲24.62
Labour	Vanessa Large	577		
Liberal Democrats	David Buxton	520		
Conservative	Lloyd Richardson	309	21.18	▼12.19
Conservative	Josie Martin	301		
Registered electors		4,881		▲16
Turnout		1,552	31.80	▼9.89
Rejected ballots		6	0.39	▲0.24
Labour hold				
Liberal Democrats gain from Labour				
