= 2026 Lewisham London Borough Council election =

2026 English local government election

- 7 May 2026

All 54 seats to Lewisham London Borough Council 28 seats needed for a majority
- Registered: 207,948
- Turnout: 87,632; 42.1%
	First party	Second party
Leader	Liam Shrivastava (Note: Mayoral candidate)	Brenda Dacres (Note: Mayoral candidate)
Party	Green	Labour
Last election	0 seats, 19.9%	54 seats, 55.4%
Seats before	4	50 (Note: Including the vacant seat in Forest Hill last held by Labour.)
Seats won	40	14
Seat change	▲36	▼36
Popular vote	101,439	83,544
Percentage	43.6%	34.4%
Swing	▲20.7pp	▼21.0pp
- Map of the results of the 2026 Lewisham London Borough council election. Labour in red and Green in green. Striped wards have mixed representation.
Mayor before election
Brenda Dacres
Labour Co-op
Mayor after election
Liam Shrivastava
Green

The 2026 Lewisham London Borough Council election took place on 7 May 2026 as part of the 2026 United Kingdom local elections. All 54 members of Lewisham London Borough Council were elected; the 2026 Lewisham mayoral election was held simultaneously to determine the council's leader. The election took place alongside the local elections in the other London boroughs.

Prior to the election, the council was under Labour majority control. The election saw Labour lose most of its seats. The Green Party won a majority on the council for the first time, taking 40 of the 54 seats. As well as the Greens winning the majority of the seats, their candidate Liam Shrivastava also won the associated mayoral election.

== Background ==
=== History ===
Result of the 2022 council election

The thirty-two London boroughs were established in 1965 by the London Government Act 1963. They are the principal authorities in Greater London and have responsibilities including education, housing, planning, highways, social services, libraries, recreation, waste, environmental health and revenue collection. Some of the powers are shared with the Greater London Authority, which also manages passenger transport, police and fire.

Since its formation, Lewisham has generally had a Labour majority. The only exceptions have been the period between 1968 and 1971 when the Conservatives controlled the council and a period of no overall control from 2006 to 2010 (though under the mayoral system Labour still formed the administration). Labour regained control of the council in the 2010 election, winning 39 seats to the Liberal Democrats' twelve seats. The Conservatives won two seats and the Green Party won one seat. Labour extended its majority in the 2014 election, winning 53 seats with a single Green councillor being elected. In the 2018 and 2022 elections, Labour won all fifty-four seats to the council.

=== Council term ===
In 2025, two Labour councillors joined the Green Party, and make up the official opposition on Lewisham Council. This is the first time Lewisham Council has had an opposition group since 2010.

Sophie Davis resigned from the council in January 2026; the seat was left vacant until the election.

== Electoral process ==
Lewisham, as is the case all other London borough councils, elects all of its councillors at once every four years, with the previous election having taken place in 2022. The election takes place by multi-member first-past-the-post voting, with each ward being represented by two or three councillors. Electors will have as many votes as there are councillors to be elected in their ward, with the top two or three being elected.

Lewisham is one of five London councils led by a directly elected mayor; all voters across the borough vote to elect a mayor by first past the post system in addition to voting for their local councillor.

All registered electors (British, Irish, Commonwealth and European Union citizens) living in London aged 18 or over are entitled to vote in the election. People who live at two addresses in different councils, such as university students with different term-time and holiday addresses, are entitled to be registered for and vote in elections in both local authorities. Voting in-person at polling stations takes place from 7:00 to 22:00 on election day, and voters are able to apply for postal votes or proxy votes in advance of the election.

== Previous council composition ==
After 2022 election		Before 2026 election		After 2026 election	
Party	Seats	Party	Seats	Party	Seats
Labour	54	Labour	49	Green	40
		Green	4	Labour	14
		Vacant	1		

== Election results ==
Council composition after the 2022 election

Council composition after the 2026 election

2026 Lewisham London Borough Council election
Party	Candidates	Seats	Gains	Losses	Net gain/loss	Seats %	Votes %	Votes	+/−
Green	53	40	36	0	▲36	74.1	43.6	103,439	+23.7
Labour	54	14	0	36	▼36	25.9	34.4	81,640	–21.0
Liberal Democrats	52	0	0	0	Steady	0.0	8.7	20,623	–4.3
Reform	35	0	0	0	Steady	0.0	6.4	15,113	N/A
Conservative	54	0	0	0	Steady	0.0	6.2	14,810	–4.8
Independent	5	0	0	0	Steady	0.0	0.2	474	–0.1
TUSC	5	0	0	0	Steady	0.0	0.2	472	–0.1
Your Party	3	0	0	0	Steady	0.0	0.1	270	N/A
CPA	1	0	0	0	Steady	0.0	<0.1	103	–0.1
Communist	1	0	0	0	Steady	0.0	<0.1	98	N/A
Climate	1	0	0	0	Steady	0.0	<0.1	41	N/A
The Motoring Party	1	0	0	0	Steady	0.0	<0.1	31	N/A

== Ward results ==
The Greens won a landslide and control the council for the first time.

=== Bellingham ===
Bellingham (2)
Party	Candidate	Votes	%	±%
Labour Co-op	Gavin Moore	838	41.2	−39.2
Green	Nadja Penfold	689	33.9	N/A
Labour Co-op	George Ryan	681	33.5	−28.0
Green	Stuart Wood	590	29.0	N/A
Reform	John Pinfold	352	17.3	N/A
Reform	Fabio Moro	333	16.4	N/A
Conservative	Belinda Giddings	164	8.1	−9.9
Conservative	Mario Bucolo	161	7.9	−2.0
Liberal Democrats	Sarah Morris	155	7.6	−5.6
Independent	James Evans	74	3.6	N/A
The Motoring Party	Jane Lawrence	31	1.5	N/A
Turnout		2,313	30.6	+7.4
Registered electors		7,568		
Labour Co-op hold				
Green gain from Labour				

=== Blackheath ===
Blackheath (3 seats)
Party	Candidate	Votes	%	±%
Green	Rebecca Jones	1,890	37.0	+20.2
Labour Co-op	Pauline Dall*	1,626	31.9	−16.4
Green	Tracey Martin	1,624	31.8	+15.3
Green	Ben Rand	1,535	30.0	+18.9
Liberal Democrats	Chris Maines	1,358	26.6	−5.6
Labour Co-op	Luke Warner*	1,341	26.2	−18.5
Liberal Democrats	Jean Branch	1,331	26.0	−2.7
Labour Co-op	Chris Membu	1,281	25.1	−12.1
Liberal Democrats	Peter Ramrayka	1,144	22.4	−6.1
Reform	Caroline Attfield	416	8.1	N/A
Reform	Charlotte Brooks	416	8.1	N/A
Reform	Iain Gordon	398	7.8	N/A
Conservative	Christopher Harding	352	6.9	−8.0
Conservative	Richard Smith	318	6.2	−4.5
Conservative	Neil Weatherall	299	5.9	−4.4
Turnout		5,395	45.6	+6.9
Registered electors		11,831		
Green gain from Labour Co-op				
Labour Co-op hold				
Green gain from Labour Co-op				

=== Brockley ===
Brockley (3)
Party	Candidate	Votes	%	±%
Green	Ade Adewunmi	2,832	56.5	+27.4
Green	Rotimi Skyers	2,724	54.3	+28.1
Green	El Fry	2,721	54.2	+28.4
Labour Co-op	Sian Eiles*	1,861	37.1	−25.3
Labour Co-op	Jay Morton	1,667	33.2	−24.2
Labour Co-op	Edward Humphreys	1,516	30.2	−18.6
Liberal Democrats	Karen Pratt	298	5.9	−2.8
Reform	Felicity Benson	292	5.8	N/A
Liberal Democrats	Michael Mawby	283	5.6	−1.5
Liberal Democrats	Benjamin Walton	267	5.3	−1.2
Conservative	Caitlin Pugh	229	4.6	−2.1
Conservative	Iona Stewart-Richardson	188	3.7	−2.7
Conservative	Alfred Sesay	171	3.4	−2.2
Turnout		5,395	43.5	+9.1
Registered electors		12,403		
Green gain from Labour				
Green gain from Labour				
Green gain from Labour				

=== Catford South ===
Catford South (3)
Party	Candidate	Votes	%	±%
Green	Briony Edwards	1,580	34.8	+24.8
Labour	Eva Stamirowski*	1,529	33.7	−26.2
Labour	Oliver Matejka	1,524	33.6	−13.0
Green	Rashid Irshad	1,295	28.5	+19.1
Labour	Robert Williams	1,295	28.5	−17.7
Green	Miki Jablkowska	1,233	27.2	+18.0
Liberal Democrats	Diana Cashin	1,077	23.7	−7.5
Liberal Democrats	Josh Matthews	944	20.8	−6.4
Liberal Democrats	Kate Richardson	921	20.3	−0.4
Reform	Jonathan Crozier	457	10.1	N/A
Reform	Adam Newman	447	9.8	N/A
Reform	James Samuel	397	8.7	N/A
Conservative	Thomas Adkin	342	7.5	−7.5
Conservative	Jessica Daniels-Roberts	299	6.6	−5.4
Conservative	Ian Stell	283	6.2	−5.1
Turnout		4,778	39.8	+7.6
Registered electors		12,011		
Green gain from Labour				
Labour hold				
Labour hold				

=== Crofton Park ===
Crofton Park (3)
Party	Candidate	Votes	%	±%
Green	Liam Shrivastava	3,090	56.7	+18.1
Green	Natalie Thomas	2,991	54.8	+27.9
Green	Aaron Regisford	2,907	53.3	+31.5
Labour Co-op	Anita Gibbons	1,809	33.2	−24.3
Labour Co-op	Harcourt Alleyne	1,804	33.1	−23.3
Labour Co-op	Alex Brooks	1,709	31.3	−18.9
Liberal Democrats	Cheryl Baum	379	6.9	−6.1
Conservative	Craig Barrett	325	6.0	−2.2
Reform	Ralph Cockram	300	5.5	N/A
Liberal Democrats	Richard Elliott	298	5.5	−2.2
Conservative	Robert Bywater	268	4.9	−2.6
Liberal Democrats	Stephen Locke	252	4.6	−1.0
Conservative	Christian Purefoy	231	4.2	−2.5
Turnout		5,715	51.6	+10.4
Registered electors		11,074		
Green gain from Labour Co-op				
Green gain from Labour Co-op				
Green gain from Labour Co-op				

=== Deptford ===
Deptford (3 seats)
Party	Candidate	Votes	%	±%
Green	Heather Farnworth	2,313	57.4	+33.1
Green	Hau-Yu Tam	2,184	54.2	+30.3
Green	Daniel Jenkins	2,082	51.7	N/A
Labour Co-op	Dawn Atkinson*	1,554	38.6	−30.0
Labour Co-op	Rosie Parry*	1,293	32.1	−26.6
Labour Co-op	David Walker*	1,069	26.5	−27.0
Conservative	James Dowling	273	6.8	−0.2
Reform	Edwin Marsden	265	6.6	N/A
Conservative	Maria Martinez	225	5.6	−0.8
Conservative	Stephen Hayes	223	5.5	N/A
Liberal Democrats	Abraham Crabb	219	5.4	−3.3
Liberal Democrats	Mark Morris	185	4.6	−3.3
TUSC	Chloe Leslie	99	2.5	N/A
Communist	Oliver Snelling	98	2.4	N/A
Turnout		4,479	39.2	+3.2
Registered electors		11,436		
Green gain from Labour Co-op				
Green gain from Labour Co-op				
Green gain from Labour Co-op				

=== Downham ===
Downham (3)
Party	Candidate	Votes	%	±%
Labour	Andre Bourne	1,291	36.2	−24.0
Labour	Gloria Lambert-Morris	1,200	33.7	−24.4
Labour	Oana Olaru-Holmes	1,141	32.0	−19.7
Green	Dan May	990	27.8	+13.5
Green	Jocelyn Stockbridge	965	27.1	+16.0
Reform	Teresa Bentinck	894	25.1	N/A
Reform	Paul Newman	864	24.2	N/A
Green	Olly Tyler	831	23.3	+13.2
Reform	Peggy Roberts	792	22.2	N/A
Conservative	Kwame Asabere	388	10.9	−14.7
Conservative	David Davis	323	9.1	−10.5
Conservative	Daniele Lucia	302	8.5	−9.8
Liberal Democrats	Heidi Degen	271	7.6	−4.4
Liberal Democrats	Vanessa Macnaughton	234	6.6	−3.4
Liberal Democrats	Ryan McMichael	208	5.8	−3.2
Turnout		3,922	31.4	+6
Registered electors		12,487		
Labour hold				
Labour hold				
Labour hold				

=== Evelyn ===
Evelyn (3)
Party	Candidate	Votes	%	±%
Green	Leni Candan	1,509	46.1	+23.0
Green	Rudi Schmidt	1,472	45.1	+26.3
Green	Dylan Cooper-Stubbs	1,378	42.2	+24.5
Labour Co-op	Will Cooper*	1,216	37.2	−30.1
Labour Co-op	Pat Codd	1,098	33.6	−20.8
Labour Co-op	Samantha Dias	1,097	33.6	−20.4
Reform	Nobin Thomas	325	9.1	N/A
Liberal Democrats	Henry Compson	272	8.3	−2.3
Liberal Democrats	Janet Hurst	248	7.6	−2.9
Conservative	George Nixon	246	7.5	−4.4
Conservative	Russ Robertson	225	6.9	−4.4
Independent	Malcolm Cadman	218	6.7	N/A
Conservative	Yan Jiang	205	6.3	N/A
Liberal Democrats	Robert Wills	196	6.0	−0.9
TUSC	Steven Rumney	64	2.0	−3.2
Independent	Kim Allenby	29	0.9	N/A
Turnout		3,572	35.4	+8.5
Registered electors		10,097		
Green gain from Labour				
Green gain from Labour				
Green gain from Labour				

=== Forest Hill ===
Forest Hill (3)
Party	Candidate	Votes	%	±%
Green	Annabelle Roberts	2,762	59.0	+29.4
Green	Fergus Navaratnam-Blair	2,740	58.5	+37.0
Labour Co-op	Peter Bernards*	2,001	42.7	−18.7
Labour Co-op	Fergal Sharpe	1,819	38.8	−13.6
Labour Co-op	Jacq Paschoud	1,729	36.9	−9.2
Liberal Democrats	Chris Hogben	545	11.6	−2.1
Liberal Democrats	John Russell	426	9.1	−3.6
Conservative	Flora Coleman	399	8.5	−3.8
Reform	Wayne Dickenson	374	8.0	N/A
Liberal Democrats	Viji Ravindra	354	7.6	−4.1
Reform	Brian Scanlon	349	7.5	N/A
Conservative	Favour Obi	234	5.0	−5.3
Conservative	Savith Vijayam	215	4.6	−4.1
CPA	Katherine Hortense	103	2.2	N/A
Turnout		5,429	48.4	+13.0
Registered electors		11,228		
Green gain from Labour Co-op				
Green gain from Labour Co-op				
Labour Co-op hold				

=== Grove Park ===
Grove Park (3)
Party	Candidate	Votes	%	±%
Labour Co-op	Suzannah Clarke*	1,555	41.3	−17.4
Green	Samantha Gower	1,293	34.4	+13.7
Labour Co-op	Hilary Moore*	1,254	33.3	−17.1
Labour Co-op	Mark Jackson*	1,155	30.7	−18.4
Green	Cormac Hollingsworth	1,084	28.8	+14.5
Green	Rory Young	1,056	28.1	N/A
Reform	Peter Newman	792	21.1	N/A
Reform	David Plumb	728	19.4	N/A
Conservative	Oliver Cliff	576	15.3	−16.1
Conservative	Sylbourne Sydial	505	13.4	−9.9
Conservative	Sergiy Lesyk	409	10.9	−11.8
Liberal Democrats	Christopher Friar	315	8.4	−9.5
Liberal Democrats	Joan Labrom	271	7.2	−4.3
Liberal Democrats	Eric Kentley	243	6.5	N/A
Independent	Raymond Allenby	49	1.3	N/A
Turnout		4,239	38.7	+7.7
Registered electors		10,943		
Labour Co-op hold				
Green gain from Labour Co-op				
Labour Co-op hold				

=== Hither Green ===
Hither Green (3)
Party	Candidate	Votes	%	±%
Labour	Yemisi Anifowose*	2,105	41.9	−23.6
Green	Eleonora Aiello	1,994	39.7	+18.2
Labour	Kim Powell*	1,909	38.0	−19.6
Labour	Mark Ingleby*	1,906	38.0	−16.9
Green	Dejean Broderick	1,837	36.6	+15.7
Green	Andy Stevens	1,814	36.1	N/A
Reform	Christopher Bass	464	9.2	N/A
Reform	Elizabeth Marsden	447	8.9	N/A
Reform	Terry Millett	427	8.5	N/A
Liberal Democrats	Julian Hawkins	407	8.1	−9.7
Liberal Democrats	Andrew Milton	367	7.3	−6.5
Liberal Democrats	Fern McLurg	336	6.7	−5.4
Conservative	Keene Sydial	316	6.3	−7.1
Conservative	Arron Hovingham	304	6.1	−5.5
Conservative	Nadia Weir	285	5.7	−5.1
Independent	Roger Mighton	104	2.1	N/A
Climate	Karen Miller	41	0.8	N/A
Turnout		5,337	39.7	+7.5
Registered electors		13,432		
Labour hold				
Green gain from Labour				
Labour hold				

=== Ladywell ===
Ladywell (3)
Party	Candidate	Votes	%	±%
Green	Shireen Asaw	2,860	56.9	+14.4
Green	Ed Sutton	2,790	55.5	+13.6
Green	Robin Mcghee	2,752	54.7	+13.4
Labour Co-op	Collet Hunter	1,700	33.8	−16.7
Labour Co-op	Ayesha Lahai-Taylor	1,667	33.1	−12.6
Labour Co-op	Nick Kelly	1,639	32.6	−12.7
Liberal Democrats	Tony Lloyd	302	6.0	−1.6
Conservative	Ben Mascall	258	5.1	−1.4
Conservative	Gregory Williams	245	4.9	−1.4
Liberal Democrats	Andrew McIlwraith	244	4.9	+1.0
Reform	Wendy Statham	235	4.7	N/A
Conservative	Noel Pellicano	211	4.2	−1.2
Liberal Democrats	Bunmi Wajero	186	3.7	+0.4
Turnout		5,359	48.9	+6.7
Registered electors		10,955		
Green gain from Labour Co-op				
Green gain from Labour Co-op				
Green gain from Labour Co-op				

=== Lee Green ===
Lee Green (3)
Party	Candidate	Votes	%	±%
Labour Co-op	Ese Erheriene*	1,762	37.3	−10.8
Green	Laura Sessions	1,696	35.9	+18.4
Labour Co-op	James Rathbone*	1,685	35.7	−8.2
Labour Co-op	David Cornelius	1,642	34.8	−6.1
Green	Samuel Goggins	1,484	31.4	+14.6
Green	Felix Ganser	1,471	31.1	+14.5
Liberal Democrats	Lizzie Fox	1,021	21.6	−9.4
Liberal Democrats	James Foulkes	856	18.1	−8.5
Liberal Democrats	Josh Mitte	689	14.6	−6.5
Reform	Michael Boscic	417	8.8	N/A
Reform	Jack Laffan	404	8.6	N/A
Conservative	Ronnie Taylor	394	8.3	−6.4
Conservative	Adam Thomas	330	7.0	−3.9
Conservative	Sam Thurgood	324	6.9	−2.7
Turnout		4,963	47.8	+5.6
Registered electors		10,392		
Labour Co-op hold				
Green gain from Labour Co-op				
Labour Co-op hold				

=== Lewisham Central ===
Lewisham Central (2)
Party	Candidate	Votes	%	±%
Green	Mark Kowalski	928	46.4	+14.0
Green	Hibaaq Aden	848	42.4	N/A
Labour	Edison Huynh*	812	40.6	−21.9
Labour	Aliya Sheikh*	663	33.2	−23.2
Reform	Abigail Gollicker	173	8.7	N/A
Conservative	Ethan Bradshaw	142	7.1	−5.8
Liberal Democrats	Tim Burnell	126	6.3	−7.2
Conservative	Junior Leachman	103	5.2	−4.2
Liberal Democrats	Martin Passande	93	4.7	−8.1
Your Party	Daniel Ansell	65	3.3	N/A
Your Party	Davis St Marthe	45	2.3	N/A
Turnout		2,202	38.4	+9.0
Registered electors		5,739		
Green gain from Labour				
Green gain from Labour				

=== New Cross Gate ===
New Cross Gate (2)
Party	Candidate	Votes	%	±%
Green	Ruth Persian	1,188	51.3	+23.7
Green	Wellington Gil	1,123	48.5	N/A
Labour Co-op	Rosie Dempsey	877	37.8	−44.6
Labour Co-op	Jamie Luke	722	31.2	−20.8
Reform	Gary Caramedon	214	9.2	N/A
Conservative	Caroline Peters	136	5.9	−3.8
Conservative	Adam Lewitt	111	4.8	−1.0
Liberal Democrats	George Crozier	101	4.4	−5.2
Liberal Democrats	Jo Perkins	90	3.9	−1.1
TUSC	Jay Coward	73	3.1	−1.9
Turnout		2,535	38.3	+9.0
Registered electors		6,614		
Green gain from Labour				
Green gain from Labour				

=== Perry Vale ===
Perry Vale (3 seats)
Party	Candidate	Votes	%	±%
Green	Maria McKenna	2,880	49.2	+21.8
Green	Justin Cheadle	2,785	47.6	+20.9
Green	Mike Podmore	2,621	44.8	N/A
Labour Co-op	Susan Wise*	1,997	34.1	−27.5
Labour Co-op	Sakina Sheikh*	1,973	33.7	−26.2
Labour Co-op	John Paschoud*	1,969	33.7	−26.0
Reform	Penelope Bower	471	8.1	N/A
Reform	John Gill	467	8.0	N/A
Reform	Jonai Pinfold	433	7.4	N/A
Liberal Democrats	Peter George	352	6.0	−8.7
Conservative	Robin Campbell-Burt	318	5.4	−6.0
Conservative	Alexandra Squires	296	5.1	−5.5
Liberal Democrats	Alex Feakes	291	5.0	−8.7
Liberal Democrats	Alan Muhammed	291	5.0	−2.6
Conservative	Bettina Skeen	278	4.8	−5.3
TUSC	Alan Bristow	122	2.1	N/A
Turnout		6,189	47.0	+10.4
Registered electors		13,156		
Green gain from Labour Co-op				
Green gain from Labour Co-op				
Green gain from Labour Co-op				

=== Rushey Green ===
Rushey Green (3)
Party	Candidate	Votes	%	±%
Green	Samantha Gardiner	2,436	48.1	+24.6
Green	Daniel Dream	2,400	47.3	+23.5
Green	Claire Wills	2,245	44.3	+24.8
Labour Co-op	Judith Mary Barrett	1,842	36.3	−30.7
Labour Co-op	James-J Walsh*	1,602	31.6	−20.3
Labour Co-op	John Muldoon*	1,420	28.0	−28.1
Reform	Craig Newell	343	6.8	N/A
Conservative	Clare Hartnell	298	5.9	−5
Conservative	Kevin Lilley	259	5.1	−5.7
Conservative	Huw Shooter	245	4.8	−4.6
Liberal Democrats	Linda Hawkins	237	4.7	−6.4
Liberal Democrats	Joseph Harmer	228	4.5	−4.1
Liberal Democrats	David Marshall	163	3.2	−4.5
Your Party	Callum Carter	160	3.2	N/A
Turnout		5,069	41.4	+9.2
Registered electors		12,232		
Green gain from Labour		Swing		
Green gain from Labour		Swing		
Green gain from Labour		Swing		

=== Sydenham ===
Sydenham (3)
Party	Candidate	Votes	%	±%
Green	Corin Ashwell	2,174	41.3	+8.7
Green	Tanya Dunne	2,171	41.3	+19.2
Green	Markus Michelucci	1,962	37.3	N/A
Labour Co-op	Chris Best*	1834	34.9	−28.3
Labour Co-op	Liam Curran*	1677	31.9	−23
Labour Co-op	Jack Lavery*	1652	31.4	−20.8
Reform	Armando Pardo	515	9.8	N/A
Reform	Dela Quist	479	9.1	N/A
Conservative	Timothy Smith	389	7.4	−8.7
Conservative	Aimee Henderson	372	7.1	−5.1
Conservative	Raymond Squires	349	6.6	−4.9
Liberal Democrats	Margot Wilson	348	6.6	−6.1
Liberal Democrats	Michael Bachmann	346	6.6	−7.2
Liberal Democrats	Quaid Combstock	279	5.3	−3.4
Turnout		5,259	42.7	+7.9
Registered electors		12,330		
Green gain from Labour		Swing		
Green gain from Labour		Swing		
Green gain from Labour		Swing		

=== Telegraph Hill ===
Telegraph Hill (3)
Party	Candidate	Votes	%	±%
Green	Kate Anderson	3,050	55.6	+15.7
Green	Becky Sanders	2,877	52.5	+25.2
Green	Nick Torry	2,693	49.1	N/A
Labour	Laura Seabright	1980	36.1	−40.4
Labour	Paul Bell*	1804	32.9	−37.1
Labour	Luke Sorba*	1752	32.0	−26.9
Liberal Democrats	Nichola Martin	232	4.2	−5.9
Reform	Kevin Stearns	230	4.2	N/A
Liberal Democrats	Mark Bennett	210	3.8	−4.3
Reform	Jonathan Wren	203	3.7	N/A
Conservative	Brendan Almqvist	167	3.0	−1.2
Conservative	Isaac Sackey	164	3.0	+0.4
Conservative	Ulric Almqvist	138	2.5	
Liberal Democrats	Richard Turley	134	2.4	N/A
TUSC	Andy Beadle	114	2.1	N/A
Turnout		5,482	45.6	+10.9
Registered electors		12,020		
Green gain from Labour		Swing		
Green gain from Labour		Swing		
Green gain from Labour		Swing		

== By-elections ==
=== Crofton Park ===
A by-election was held after the inability of Liam Shrivastava to take his seat due to him being elected mayor.

Crofton Park by-election: 18 June 2026
Party	Candidate	Votes	%	±%
Green	Esther Lie	1,340	44.9	−11.8
Labour	Alex Brooks	1,330	44.5	+11.3
Reform	Paul Newman	127	4.3	−1.2
Liberal Democrats	Richard Elliott	106	3.5	−3.4
Conservative	Caitlin Pugh	73	2.4	−3.6
Independent	Roger Mighton	10	0.3	N/A
Turnout		2,993	26.9	−24.7
Rejected ballots		7		
Registered electors		11,135		
Green hold		Swing		
