= 1994 Lewisham London Borough Council election =

1994 local election in England

- 5 May 1994

All 67 seats up for election to Lewisham London Borough Council 34 seats needed for a majority
- Registered: 172,649
- Turnout: 70,751, 40.98% (▼4.22)

	First party	Second party	Third party
Leader	Margaret Moran	Unknown	Andrew W.J. Lawrence (Note: Lawrence is the de facto local party leader due to being the only Conservative councillor)
Party	Labour	Liberal Democrats	Conservative
Leader since	1993	Unknown	1994
Leader's seat	Churchdown	Unknown	St Mildred
Last election	58 seats, 57.61%	3 seats, 6.47%	6 seats, 32.11%
Seats won	63	3	1
Seat change	▲5	Steady	▼5
Popular vote	105,606	17,516	38,793
Percentage	64.51%	10.70%	23.70%
Swing	▲6.90	▲4.23	▼8.41
Council control before election
Labour
Council control after election
Labour

Elections to Lewisham London Borough Council were held in May 1994. The whole council was up for election.

Lewisham local elections are held every four years, with the next due in 1998.

== Election result ==
Lewisham local election result 1994
Party	Seats	Gains	Losses	Net gain/loss	Seats %	Votes %	Votes	+/−
Labour	63	5	0	▲5	94.03	64.51	105,606	▲6.90
Liberal Democrats	3	0	0	Steady	4.48	10.70	17,516	▲4.23
Conservative	1	0	5	▼5	1.49	23.70	38,793	▼8.41
Green	0	0	0	Steady	0.00	0.90	1,473	▼2.04
National Front	0	0	0	Steady	0.00	0.12	203	New
Independent	0	0	0	Steady	0.00	0.07	108	New
Total	67						163,699	

== Ward results ==
(*) - indicates an incumbent candidate

(†) - indicates an incumbent candidate standing in a different ward

=== Bellingham ===
Bellingham (2)
Party	Candidate	Votes	%	±%
Labour	John O'Shea*	1,591	78.47	▲11.18
Labour	Ronald Stockbridge*	1,515		
Conservative	Rosemary Pratt	426	21.53	▼2.88
Conservative	Margaret Smith	425		
Registered electors		5,895		▼130
Turnout		2,252	38.20	▼6.48
Rejected ballots		4	0.18	▲0.07
Labour hold				
Labour hold				

=== Blackheath ===
Blackheath (2)
Party	Candidate	Votes	%	±%
Labour	Gavin Moore*	1,334	60.81	▲16.21
Labour	Heidi Nash	1,259		
Conservative	William Fox	554	25.41	▼13.23
Conservative	Guy Marshall	529		
Liberal Democrats	David Porter	309	13.78	New
Liberal Democrats	Eric Scott-Phillips	278		
Registered electors		5,179		▲407
Turnout		2,287	44.16	▼9.13
Rejected ballots		8	0.35	▲0.19
Labour hold				
Labour hold				

=== Blythe Hill ===
Blythe Hill (2)
Party	Candidate	Votes	%	±%
Labour	James Eytle*	1,273	55.72	▲6.22
Labour	Sylvia Scott	1,092		
Conservative	Jonathan Fraser-Howells	446	19.69	▼19.45
Conservative	Ruth Whitelaw	390		
Liberal Democrats	Carlton Christensen	278	13.09	New
Green	John Gingell	244	11.49	▲0.13
Registered electors		5,073		▼347
Turnout		2,140	42.18	▼7.19
Rejected ballots		7	0.33	▲0.03
Labour hold				
Labour hold				

=== Catford ===
Catford (2)
Party	Candidate	Votes	%	±%
Labour	Alan Porter	1,185	47.43	▲7.44
Labour	Carl Handley	1,125		
Conservative	Richard Greenwood* (Note: Greenwood replaced Cllr Yard after his resignation in 1992)	1,042	41.56	▼6.40
Conservative	Victor Atkinson	981		
Liberal Democrats	Brian Herring	270	11.01	New
Liberal Democrats	Adebayo Adetona	265		
Registered electors		5,787		▼86
Turnout		2,618	45.24	▼3.54
Rejected ballots		12	0.46	▲0.25
Labour gain from Conservative				
Labour gain from Conservative				

=== Churchdown ===
Churchdown (3)
Party	Candidate	Votes	%	±%
Labour	Margaret Moran*	1,844	57.86	▲5.25
Labour	Clive Jordan*	1,730		
Labour	Foqia Hayee	1,624		
Conservative	Andrew Lee	713	22.64	▼16.09
Conservative	Ghislaine Greensitt	667		
Conservative	Ronald Lee	653		
Liberal Democrats	Janet Hurst	584	19.50	▲10.84
Registered electors		7,109		▼185
Turnout		3,175	44.66	▼8.56
Rejected ballots		5	0.16	▼0.05
Labour hold				
Labour hold				
Labour hold				

=== Crofton Park ===
Crofton Park (3)
Party	Candidate	Votes	%	±%
Labour	Sally Lovett	2,212	66.01	▲15.07
Labour	Nicholas Taylor	2,187		
Labour	Gurbakhsh Garcha*	2,070		
Conservative	Pamela Barnes	682	18.50	▼9.73
Conservative	Kate Hurley	593		
Conservative	David Furze	538		
Liberal Democrats	Robin Altwarg	506	15.49	New
Registered electors		7,872		▼347
Turnout		3,368	42.78	▼4.01
Rejected ballots		12	0.36	▲0.10
Labour hold				
Labour hold				
Labour hold				

=== Downham ===
Downham (3)
Party	Candidate	Votes	%	±%
Liberal Democrats	Julian Hawkins*	1,730	57.87	▲6.92
Liberal Democrats	Marc Morgan-Huws	1,712		
Liberal Democrats	Matthew Huntbach	1,664		
Labour	Dorothy Hyne	1,089	34.77	▲0.39
Labour	Frances Neal	1,021		
Labour	Beverley Thompson	958		
Conservative	Clifford Simpson^{†} (Note: Simpson was a sitting councillor representing the St Mildred ward)	221	7.36	▼7.31
Conservative	Susa Bennett	219		
Conservative	Eglantine Draper	209		
Registered electors		6,565		▼1,017
Turnout		3,340	50.88	▼2.92
Rejected ballots		8	0.24	▲0.09
Liberal Democrats hold				
Liberal Democrats hold				
Liberal Democrats hold				

=== Drake ===
Drake (3)
Party	Candidate	Votes	%	±%
Labour	Terence Scott^{†} (Note: Scott was a sitting councillor representing the Marlowe ward)	1,706	58.19	▼1.90
Labour	Obajimi Adefiranye*	1,691		
Labour	Jarman Parmar*	1,631		
Green	Alexandra Murrell	508	17.64	▼5.41
Liberal Democrats	Keith Adderley	419	14.55	New
Conservative	Thomas Barnes	334	9.62	▼7.24
Conservative	Judith Moorhouse	263		
Conservative	Peter Moorhouse	233		
Registered electors		7,832		▼331
Turnout		2,633	33.62	▼4.11
Rejected ballots		10	0.38	▲0.22
Labour hold				
Labour hold				
Labour hold				

=== Evelyn ===
Evelyn (3)
Party	Candidate	Votes	%	±%
Labour	Mary Edmond*	1,664	69.54	▼0.31
Labour	Mark Nottingham*	1,557		
Labour	Mee Ng*	1,376		
Liberal Democrats	Peter Wells	414	18.79	New
Conservative	Dawn Asplin	285	11.67	▼3.50
Conservative	William Warren	251		
Conservative	Audrey O'Donnell	234		
Registered electors		7,330		▲757
Turnout		2,236	30.50	▼6.38
Rejected ballots		6	0.27	▼0.02
Labour hold				
Labour hold				
Labour hold				

=== Forest Hill ===
Forest Hill (2)
Party	Candidate	Votes	%	±%
Labour	Jacqueline Addison*	1,430	72.58	▲8.92
Labour	John Paschoud	1,295		
Conservative	Margaret Ball	546	27.42	▼8.92
Conservative	Margaret Punyer	484		
Registered electors		4,989		▼271
Turnout		2,040	40.89	▼3.44
Rejected ballots		13	0.64	▲0.13
Labour hold				
Labour hold				

=== Grinling Gibbons ===
Grinling Gibbons (3)
Party	Candidate	Votes	%	±%
Labour	Dave Brown*	1,533	63.68	▼1.80
Labour	James Mallory*	1,409		
Labour	Man Mohan*	1,351		
Green	Benjamin Beck	340	15.13	▼4.67
Conservative	Doris Addison	266	9.66	▼5.06
Liberal Democrats	Janet Scott-Phillips	259	11.53	New
Conservative	Margaret Squires	202		
Conservative	William Titzell	182		
Registered electors		7,293		▲166
Turnout		2,264	31.04	▼3.57
Rejected ballots		9	0.40	▲0.08
Labour hold				
Labour hold				
Labour hold				

=== Grove Park ===
Grove Park (2)
Party	Candidate	Votes	%	±%
Labour	John Macdonald	1,166	54.30	▲4.81
Labour	Ashtaq Arain^{†} (Note: Arain was a sitting councillor representing the Blythe Hill ward)	980		
Conservative	Barrie Anderson	658	31.58	▼9.87
Conservative	William Bellers	590		
Liberal Democrats	Charles Nunn	279	14.12	▲5.06
Liberal Democrats	Mairghread Davies	278		
Registered electors		5,011		▼196
Turnout		2,160	43.11	▼3.90
Rejected ballots		3	0.14	▲0.10
Labour hold				
Labour hold				

=== Hither Green ===
Hither Green (3)
Party	Candidate	Votes	%	±%
Labour	David Wilson	2,044	71.79	▲9.25
Labour	Solomon Brown	1,943		
Labour	Anthony Link*	1,929		
Conservative	Barry Olley	837	28.21	▼0.07
Conservative	Hilda Newland	758		
Conservative	Philip Richards	729		
Registered electors		8,184		▼317
Turnout		3,134	38.29	▼3.88
Rejected ballots		24	0.77	▲0.44
Labour hold				
Labour hold				
Labour hold				

=== Horiman ===
Horniman (3)
Party	Candidate	Votes	%	±%
Labour	Stewart Elliott	1,584	47.42	▲1.10
Labour	Angelina Simpson	1,490		
Labour	Tayo Oke	1,421		
Conservative	Angela Bradshaw	1,206	37.42	▼6.20
Conservative	Charles Cramp*	1,175		
Conservative	Anthony Patton	1,164		
Liberal Democrats	Eileen Collins	479	15.16	▲5.01
Registered electors		7,457		▼542
Turnout		3,397	45.55	▲0.72
Rejected ballots		5	0.15	▲0.01
Labour hold				
Labour hold				
Labour gain from Conservative				

=== Ladywell ===
Ladywell (3)
Party	Candidate	Votes	%	±%
Labour	Miriam Eze-Iloghalu* (Note: Eze-Iloghalu replaced Cllr Doyle after his resignation in 1992)	1,772	68.77	▲7.11
Labour	Paul Newing^{†} (Note: Newing was a sitting councillor representing the Hither Green ward)	1,745		
Labour	James Stevenson*	1,721		
Liberal Democrats	John James	450	17.72	New
Conservative	Thelma Shilling	362	13.51	▼7.47
Conservative	Catherine Eaton	335		
Conservative	Gordon Lindsay	333		
Registered electors		7,299		▼203
Turnout		2,689	36.84	▼4.30
Rejected ballots		6	0.22	▼0.07
Labour hold				
Labour hold				
Labour hold				

=== Manor Lee ===
Manor Lee (2)
Party	Candidate	Votes	%	±%
Labour	Madeliene Long*	1,762	70.00	▲14.31
Labour	David Sullivan*	1,658		
Liberal Democrats	Linda Hawkins	417	11.17	New
Conservative	Caroline Barnett	390	14.74	▼8.44
Conservative	Eleanor Picton	329		
Liberal Democrats	Herbert Maltby	328		
Registered electors		5,678		▼264
Turnout		2,619	46.13	▼4.09
Rejected ballots		7	0.27	▲0.17
Labour hold				
Labour hold				

=== Marlowe ===
Marlowe (3)
Party	Candidate	Votes	%	±%
Labour	Stephen Padmore	1,676	67.52	▼15.83
Labour	Eddie Capone	1,649		
Labour	Ruth Watt	1,564		
Liberal Democrats	Patrick Keaveney	412	15.66	New
Liberal Democrats	Paula Keaveney	393		
Liberal Democrats	Alec Martin	329		
Conservative	Carolyn Freeman	227	8.41	▼8.24
Conservative	Paul Asplin	208		
National Front	Anthony Johnson	203	8.41	New
Conservative	James Wright	175		
Registered electors		7,495		▲922
Turnout		2,617	34.92	▼1.96
Rejected ballots		6	0.23	▼0.06
Labour hold				
Labour hold				
Labour hold				

=== Pepys ===
Pepys (3)
Party	Candidate	Votes	%	±%
Labour	Angela Cornforth*	2,128	84.57	▲1.38
Labour	John Rudd* (Note: Rudd replaced Cllr Dawson after her resignation in 1991)	2,102		
Labour	Ian Page*	2,015		
Conservative	Iris Ward	420	15.43	▼1.38
Conservative	Vanessa Cregan	361		
Conservative	Frank Ward	360		
Registered electors		7,451		▲61
Turnout		2,746	36.85	▼3.69
Rejected ballots		16	0.58	▼0.04
Labour hold				
Labour hold				
Labour hold				

=== Perry Hill ===
Perry Hill (3)
Party	Candidate	Votes	%	±%
Labour	Colin Hastie*	2,018	57.04	▲6.33
Labour	Alan Till* (Note: Till replaced Cllr Walsh after his death in 1992)	1,984		
Labour	Duncan Rodger*	1,961		
Conservative	Adam Hart	997	26.06	▼10.64
Conservative	Huw Shooter	874		
Conservative	Khalid Sharif	852		
Liberal Democrats	Frederick Brown	589	16.90	New
Registered electors		8,034		▼307
Turnout		3,572	44.46	▼1.06
Rejected ballots		10	0.28	▲0.04
Labour hold				
Labour hold				
Labour hold				

=== Rushey Green ===
Rushey Green (2)
Party	Candidate	Votes	%	±%
Labour	Ian Arnold*	1,530	72.64	▲5.02
Labour	Bala Gnanapragasam	1,290		
Conservative	Charles Bradshaw	320	16.18	▼6.87
Conservative	Robert Mills	308		
Liberal Democrats	John Bennett	225	11.18	▲1.85
Liberal Democrats	Roger Fortune	208		
Registered electors		5,775		▼464
Turnout		2,160	37.40	▼2.19
Rejected ballots		4	0.19	▼0.05
Labour hold				
Labour hold				

=== St Andrew ===
St Andrew (2)
Party	Candidate	Votes	%	±%
Labour	Michael Holder*	1,140	45.88	▲8.17
Labour	Claude Gonsalves^{†} (Note: Gonsalves was a sitting councillor representing the Crofton Park ward)	1,132		
Liberal Democrats	Tudor Griffiths	688	26.25	▼3.47
Liberal Democrats	Andrew Smith	612		
Conservative	Peter Vickers	586	23.51	▼9.06
Conservative	Robert Light	578		
Independent	Russell White	108	4.36	New
Registered electors		5,533		▼237
Turnout		2,633	47.59	▼3.02
Rejected ballots		8	0.30	▼0.04
Labour hold				
Labour hold				

=== St Margaret ===
St Margaret (2)
Party	Candidate	Votes	%	±%
Labour	Glyn Austin	1,596	60.72	▲10.67
Labour	David Whiting^{†} (Note: Whiting was a sitting councillor representing the Horniman)	1,412		
Conservative	John Welsh	608	24.30	▼12.92
Conservative	Richard Town	596		
Liberal Democrats	Ben Brooks	371	14.98	▲6.46
Registered electors		5,266		▼118
Turnout		2,508	47.63	▼5.86
Rejected ballots		3	0.12	▼0.09
Labour hold				
Labour hold				

=== St Mildred ===
St Mildred (3)
Party	Candidate	Votes	%	±%
Labour	Glyn Alsworth	1,819	43.96	▲4.11
Labour	Kelly Conway	1,752		
Conservative	Andrew Lawrence*	1,707	41.93	▼5.95
Conservative	David Britton	1,694		
Labour	Mahmuda Kabir	1,627		
Conservative	David McInnes	1,559		
Liberal Democrats	Patrick McKee	613	14.10	New
Liberal Democrats	Brenda Pooley	537		
Liberal Democrats	Evelyn Sumption	519		
Registered electors		8,781		▲291
Turnout		4,309	49.07	▼2.48
Rejected ballots		9	0.21	▼0.06
Labour gain from Conservative				
Labour gain from Conservative				
Conservative hold				

=== Sydenham East ===
Sydenham East (3)
Party	Candidate	Votes	%	±%
Labour	Chris Best*	1,783	64.18	▲9.33
Labour	Steve Bullock*	1,636		
Labour	Alan Pegg*	1,551		
Conservative	Henriette Dodd	587	21.07	▼10.09
Conservative	Irene Dodd	536		
Conservative	Roger Pawley	508		
Green	Ronald Wilson	381	14.76	▲0.77
Registered electors		7,219		▼418
Turnout		2,724	37.73	▼5.01
Rejected ballots		9	0.33	▲0.18
Labour hold				
Labour hold				
Labour hold				

=== Sydenham West ===
Sydenham West (3)
Party	Candidate	Votes	%	±%
Labour	Liam Curran	1,852	57.81	▲8.30
Labour	Harold Feather	1,775		
Labour	William McLaughlin	1,716		
Conservative	Colin Ockendon	729	22.52	▼12.99
Conservative	Pamela Shooter	677		
Conservative	David Waugh	677		
Liberal Democrats	Mark Bennett	606	19.67	▲12.52
Registered electors		7,677		▼311
Turnout		3,102	40.41	▼4.26
Rejected ballots		10	0.32	▲0.29
Labour hold				
Labour hold				
Labour hold				

=== Whitefoot ===
Whitefoot (2)
Party	Candidate	Votes	%	±%
Labour	Liam Carlisle	992	53.02	▲1.44
Labour	Carl Kisicki*	939		
Conservative	Eric Coombs	629	33.37	▼6.85
Conservative	Allan Chambers	586		
Liberal Democrats	Russell Day	259	13.61	▲5.41
Liberal Democrats	William Hawkins	236		
Registered electors		4,865		▼340
Turnout		2,028	41.69	▼6.36
Rejected ballots		3	0.15	▲0.11
Labour hold				
Labour hold				
