= Catford South =

Electoral ward in London, England

- Electoral ward for the Lewisham London Borough Council
- Borough: Lewisham
- County: Greater London
- Population: 17,258 (2021)
- Major settlements: Catford
- Area: 2.281 km²

Current electoral ward
- Created: 2002
- Councillors: 3

Catford South is an electoral ward in the Borough of Lewisham. The ward was first used in the 2002 elections and elects three councillors to Lewisham London Borough Council.

== Geography ==
The ward is named after Catford.

== Councillors ==
Election	Councillors		
2022	Natasha Burgess (Labour)	James Royston (Labour)	Eva Stamirowski (Labour)
2026			

== Elections ==
=== 2022 ===
Catford South (3)
Party	Candidate	Votes	%	±%
Labour	Natasha Burgess	2,119	59.9	
Labour	Eva Stamirowski*	1,648	46.6	
Labour	James Royston	1,632	46.2	
Liberal Democrats	Diana Cashin	1,104	31.2	
Liberal Democrats	Kate Richardson	960	27.2	
Liberal Democrats	Bunmi Wajero	731	20.7	
Conservative	Thomas Adkin	532	15.0	
Conservative	Mario Bucolo	425	12.0	
Conservative	Benjamin Loughnane	399	11.3	
Green	Rona Radenhurst	352	10.0	
Green	Malcolm Furneaux	332	9.4	
Green	James Newton	324	9.2	
Shared Ground	Richard Galloway	47	1.3	
Turnout			32.2	
Labour hold		Swing		
Labour hold		Swing		
Labour hold		Swing		
