= Crofton Park (ward) =

Electoral ward in London, England

Crofton Park Brockley (1965–1973)
- Electoral ward for the Lewisham London Borough Council
- Crofton Park ward boundaries since 2022
- Borough: Lewisham
- County: Greater London
- Population: 15,429 (2021) (Note: 2021 Census data reported for 2022 ward boundaries)
- Major settlements: Crofton Park
- Area: 1.722 km²

Current electoral ward
- Created: 1965
- Number of members: 3
- Councillors: Natalie Thomas; Aaron Regisford; Esther Lie
- GSS code: E05013718 (2022–present)

Crofton Park is an electoral ward in the London Borough of Lewisham. The ward was first used in the 1964 elections and elects three councillors to Lewisham London Borough Council. The ward was renamed from Brockley to Crofton Park in 1973.

== List of councillors ==
Election	Councillors		
2022	Tauseef Anwar (Labour)	Chris Barnham (Labour)	Carol Webley-Brown (Labour)

== Summary ==
Councillors elected by party at each general borough election.

- Labour
- Conservative
- Liberal Democrats
- Green

== Lewisham council elections since 2022 ==
There was a revision of ward boundaries in Lewisham in 2022.

=== 2026 by-election ===
The by-election took place on 18 June 2026, following the election of Liam Shrivastava as mayor of Lewisham.

2026 Crofton Park by-election
Party	Candidate	Votes	%	±%
Green	Esther Lie	1,340	44.9	−7.5
Labour	Alex Brooks	1,330	44.5	+13.9
Reform	Paul Newman	127	4.3	−0.8
Liberal Democrats	Richard Elliott	106	3.5	−2.9
Conservative	Caitlin Pugh	73	2.4	−3.1
Independent	Roger Mighton	10	0.3	N/A
Turnout				
Green hold		Swing		

=== 2026 election ===
The election took place on 7 May 2026.

2026 Lewisham London Borough Council election: Crofton Park (3)
Party	Candidate	Votes	%	±%
Green	Liam Shrivastava	3,090		
Green	Natalie Thomas	2,991		
Green	Aaron Regisford	2,907		
Labour Co-op	Anita Gibbons	1809		
Labour Co-op	Harcourt Alleyne	1804		
Labour Co-op	Alex Brooks	1709		
Liberal Democrats	Cheryl Baum	379		
Conservative	Craig Barrett	325		
Reform	Ralph Cockram	300		
Liberal Democrats	Richard Elliott	298		
Conservative	Robert Bywater	268		
Liberal Democrats	Stephen Locke	252		
Conservative	Christian Purefoy	231		
Turnout				
Green gain from Labour		Swing		
Green gain from Labour		Swing		
Green gain from Labour		Swing		

=== 2022 election ===
The election took place on 5 May 2022.

2022 Lewisham London Borough Council election: Crofton Park (3)
Party	Candidate	Votes	%	±%
Labour	Tauseef Anwar	2,457	57.5	
Labour	Chris Barnham	2,411	56.4	
Labour	Carol Webley-Brown	2,147	50.2	
Green	Anna-Maria Cahalane	1,649	38.6	
Green	Alison Pick	1,148	26.9	
Green	John Keidan	933	21.8	
Liberal Democrats	Cheryl Baum	554	13.0	
Conservative	Paul Black	349	8.2	
Liberal Democrats	Stephen Locke	331	7.7	
Conservative	Jonathan Lee	319	7.5	
Conservative	Oliver Patey	286	6.7	
Liberal Democrats	Andrew McIlwraith	240	5.6	
Turnout			41.2	
Labour hold		Swing		
Labour hold		Swing		
Labour hold		Swing		

== 2002–2022 Lewisham council elections ==
Crofton Park ward boundaries from 2002 to 2022

There was a revision of ward boundaries in Lewisham in 2002.

=== 2018 election ===
The election took place on 3 May 2018.

2018 Lewisham London Borough Council election: Crofton Park (3)
Party	Candidate	Votes	%	±%
Labour	Tauseef Anwar	2,445	53.6	+13.6
Labour	Pauline Morrison	2,418	53.0	+8.0
Labour	Chris Barnham	2,353	51.6	+4.6
Green	Alison Pick	916	20.1	+0.6
Green	Julia Rendall	817	17.9	−3.7
Green	Alan Greenwood	708	15.5	−2.7
Liberal Democrats	Rosalind Huish	613	13.4	+5.5
Liberal Democrats	Bobby Dean	607	13.3	+8.1
Liberal Democrats	Bunmi Wajero	513	11.3	+7.9
Conservative	James Clark	466	10.2	−1.2
Conservative	Scott Bell	455	10.0	+1.4
Conservative	Karen Sunderland	408	9.0	+0.5
Majority				
Turnout			42	
Labour hold		Swing		
Labour hold		Swing		
Labour hold		Swing		

=== 2014 election ===
The election took place on 22 May 2014.

2014 Lewisham London Borough Council election: Crofton Park (3)
Party	Candidate	Votes	%	±%
Labour	Christopher Barnham	2,057	47.0	+12.5
Labour	Pauline Morrison	1,969	45.0	+12.9
Labour	Roy Kennedy	1,753	40.0	+11.0
Green	Alice Casey	948	21.6	+5.4
Green	Alison Pick	856	19.5	+5.7
Green	Anne Scott	797	18.2	+6.6
People Before Profit	Nik Antoniades	603	13.8	+9.6
Conservative	Catherine Allen	501	11.4	−3.1
Conservative	Michael Baker	375	8.6	−3.8
Conservative	Karen Lowe	371	8.5	−3.3
Liberal Democrats	Paul Murphy	346	7.9	−25.8
UKIP	Elizabeth Simpson	330	7.5	N/A
Liberal Democrats	Catherine Pluygers	226	5.2	−22.6
Liberal Democrats	William Town	151	3.4	−22.2
Democratic Reform Party	Phillip Badger	59	1.3	N/A
Turnout		4,380	40.6	
Labour hold		Swing		
Labour gain from Liberal Democrats		Swing		
Labour hold		Swing		

=== 2010 election ===
The election on 6 May 2010 took place on the same day as the United Kingdom general election.

2010 Lewisham London Borough Council election: Crofton Park (3)
Party	Candidate	Votes	%	±%
Labour	Jackie Addison	2,309	34.5	
Liberal Democrats	John Bowen	2,256	33.7	
Labour	Pauline Morrison	2,151	32.1	
Labour	Sylvia Scott	1,944	29.0	
Liberal Democrats	Michélé McClarren	1,863	27.8	
Liberal Democrats	Barrie Hall	1,714	25.6	
Green	Hatice Gunes	1,087	16.2	
Conservative	Kate Allen	969	14.5	
Green	Jim Jepps	927	13.8	
Conservative	Michael Rutherford	831	12.4	
Conservative	David Furze	789	11.8	
Green	Roger Sedgley	779	11.6	
People Before Profit	Karl Thomas	282	4.2	
Turnout		6,696	64.8	
Labour hold		Swing		
Liberal Democrats gain from Labour		Swing		
Labour hold		Swing		

=== 2006 election ===
The election took place on 4 May 2006.

=== 2002 election ===
The election took place on 2 May 2002.

== 1978–2002 Lewisham council elections ==
There was a revision of ward boundaries in Lewisham in 1978.

=== 1998 election ===
The election on 7 May 1998 took place on the same day as the 1998 Greater London Authority referendum.

1998 Lewisham London Borough Council election: Crofton Park (3)
Party	Candidate	Votes	%	±%
Labour	Fiona Crichlow	1,576	58.58	▼7.43
Labour	Gurbakhsh Garcha	1,390		
Labour	Ruth Watt	1,380		
Green	Neil Cole-Fennel	530	21.43	New
Conservative	Amanda Graham	523	19.99	▲1.49
Conservative	Matthew Sutcliffe	493		
Conservative	Derek Turner	467		
Registered electors		7,800		▼72
Turnout		2,438	31.26	▼11.52
Rejected ballots		8	0.33	▼0.03
Labour hold				
Labour hold				
Labour hold				

=== 1994 election ===
The election took place on 5 May 1994.

1994 Lewisham London Borough Council election: Crofton Park (3)
Party	Candidate	Votes	%	±%
Labour	Sally Lovett	2,212	66.01	▲15.07
Labour	Nicholas Taylor	2,187		
Labour	Gurbakhsh Garcha	2,070		
Conservative	Pamela Barnes	682	18.50	▼9.73
Conservative	Kate Hurley	593		
Conservative	David Furze	538		
Liberal Democrats	Robin Altwarg	506	15.49	New
Registered electors		7,872		▼347
Turnout		3,368	42.78	▼4.01
Rejected ballots		12	0.36	▲0.10
Labour hold				
Labour hold				
Labour hold				

=== 1990 election ===
The election took place on 3 May 1990.

=== 1986 election ===
The election took place on 8 May 1986.

=== 1982 election ===
The election took place on 6 May 1982.

=== 1978 election ===
The election took place on 4 May 1978.

1978 Lewisham London Borough Council election: Crofton Park (3)
Party	Candidate	Votes	%	±%
Conservative	G. Elvin	1,841	50.2	
Conservative	C. Nicklin	1,805		
Conservative	D. Stone	1,774		
Labour	J. Britton	1,515	41.3	
Labour	A. Patterson	1,475		
Labour	D. Waters	1,453		
Community	N. Fierz	308	8.4	
Community	K. Pullinger	267		
Community	L. Kemp	240		
Total votes			44.2	
Registered electors		8,732		
Conservative win (new boundaries)				
Conservative win (new boundaries)				
Conservative win (new boundaries)				

== 1964–1978 Lewisham council elections ==
External image
- Map showing Brockley/Crofton Park ward boundaries from 1965 to 1978

=== 1974 election ===
The election took place on 2 May 1974.

=== 1971 election ===
The election took place on 13 May 1971. The Brockley ward was renamed Crofton Park in 1973 without change of boundaries.

1971 Lewisham London Borough Council election: Brockley (3)
Party	Candidate	Votes	%	±%
Labour	J. Wheeler	2,727	56.7	+25.6
Labour	A. Theobald	2,675		
Labour	A. Kaye	2,666		
Conservative	M. Snowdon	2,084	31.1	−25.6
Conservative	J. Bundock	2,040		
Conservative	M. Baker	2,038		
Turnout			47.5	+8.8
Registered electors		10,279		
Labour gain from Conservative		Swing		
Labour gain from Conservative		Swing		
Labour gain from Conservative		Swing		

=== 1968 election ===
The election took place on 9 May 1968.

1968 Lewisham London Borough Council election: Brockley (3)
Party	Candidate	Votes	%	±%
Conservative	T. Pickup	2,713	68.9	+25.1
Conservative	J. Hainsworth	2,704		
Conservative	I. Turner	2,665		
Labour	P. Forward	1,222	31.1	−14.5
Labour	D. Cox	1,221		
Labour	T. Bradley	1,185		
Turnout			38.7	−0.3
Registered electors		10,327		
Conservative gain from Labour		Swing		
Conservative gain from Labour		Swing		
Conservative gain from Labour		Swing		

=== 1964 election ===
The election took place on 7 May 1964.

1964 Lewisham London Borough Council election: Brockley (3)
Party	Candidate	Votes	%	±%
Labour	P. Forward	1,852	45.6	N/A
Labour	L. Moody	1,847		N/A
Labour	J. Lynch	1,827		N/A
Conservative	A. Wilkins	1,778	43.8	N/A
Conservative	W. Church	1,771		N/A
Conservative	R. Groves	1,739		N/A
Liberal	S. Davies	427	10.5	N/A
Liberal	J. Whale	417		N/A
Liberal	D. Birtchnell	411		N/A
Turnout		4,081	39.0	N/A
Registered electors		10,465		
Labour win (new seat)				
Labour win (new seat)				
Labour win (new seat)				
