= Whitefoot =

Former electoral ward in the London borough of Lewisham

- Former electoral ward for the Lewisham London Borough Council
- Whitefoot ward boundaries from 2002 to 2022
- Borough: Lewisham
- County: Greater London

Former electoral ward
- Created: 1965
- Abolished: 2022
- GSS code: E05000454

Whitefoot was, until 2022, an electoral ward in the London Borough of Lewisham. Its area is 13 km (8.1 mi) south-east of Charing Cross, and north of Downham, south of Catford, west of Grove Park, and east of Bellingham. The ward was named after Whitefoot Lane, which formed much of its northern boundary.

Part of the South Eastern Main Line between Hither Green and Grove Park stations marked the whole eastern edge of the ward. The western boundary followed some of the Catford Loop Line, between Bellingham and Beckenham Hill stations, and small parts of two A-roads, South End Lane (A2218) and Bromley Road (A21).

The Whitefoot area is covered by two postcode districts, BR1 in the south and SE6 in the north; most of their common boundary follows Whitefoot Lane. Hither Green Cemetery is on the east side of the ward, and Forster Memorial Park in the west.

One of the ward's councillors from 2010 to 2019 was Labour's Janet Daby, who resigned to concentrate on her role as the MP for Lewisham East, which includes Whitefoot in its boundaries. She won the parliamentary seat at a 2018 by-election. In 2006, the Liberal Democrats won all three ward seats. Daby gained one in 2010, before the other two seats were gained by Labour in 2014. In 2021, all three seats were held by Labour.

From 2022, Whitefoot was replaced by the new Catford South, Hither Green and Downham wards.

== 2002–2022 Lewisham council elections ==
There was a revision in ward boundaries in Lewisham in 2002.

=== 2019 by-election ===
The by-election took place on 2 May 2019, following the resignation of Janet Daby. It was held on the same day as the 2019 Evelyn by-election.

2019 Whitefoot by-election
Party	Candidate	Votes	%	±%
Labour	Kim Powell	1,314		
Liberal Democrats	Max Brockbank	514		
Conservative	Ben Blackmore	313		
People Before Profit	Gwenton Sloley	218		
CPA	Katherine Hortense	52		
Women's Equality	Cairis Grant-Hickey	41		
Democrats and Veterans	Massimo Dimambro	28		
Turnout				
Labour hold		Swing		

=== 2018 election ===
The election took place on 3 May 2018.

2018 Lewisham London Borough Council election: Whitefoot (3)
Party	Candidate	Votes	%	±%
Labour	Janet Daby	2,094	65.8	
Labour	Mark Ingleby	1,947	61.2	
Labour	Jonathan Slater	1,578	49.6	
Conservative	Peter Buffham	519	16.3	
Conservative	Andrew Lee	474	14.9	
Conservative	Roger Lewis	383	12.0	
Liberal Democrats	Janet Hurst	324	10.2	
Green	Gerry Howell	297	9.3	
Liberal Democrats	Mark Morris	236	7.4	
Liberal Democrats	Vijay Naidu	163	5.1	
Majority				
Turnout			32	
Labour hold		Swing		
Labour hold		Swing		
Labour hold		Swing		

=== 2014 election ===
The election took place on 22 May 2014.

=== 2010 election ===
The election on 6 May 2010 took place on the same day as the United Kingdom general election.

=== 2006 election ===
The election took place on 4 May 2006.

=== 2002 election ===
The election took place on 2 May 2002.

== 1978–2002 Lewisham council elections ==
There was a revision in ward boundaries in Lewisham in 1978.
