= 1971 Lewisham London Borough Council election =

Elections to Lewisham London Borough Council were held on 13th May 1971. The whole council was up for election. Turnout was 39.8%. This election had aldermen as well as councillors. Labour and the Conservatives each got five aldermen.

== Election result ==
Lewisham local election result 1971
Party	Seats	Gains	Losses	Net gain/loss	Seats %	Votes %	Votes	+/−
Labour	61				87.1	63.2		
Conservative	9				12.9	33.8		
Liberal	0				0.0	1.8		

== Results by ward ==
=== Bellingham ===
Bellingham (2 Seats)
Party	Candidate	Votes	%	±%
Labour	Stanley Hardy	2,768	87.0	+21.0
Labour	S Burlison	2,727		
Conservative	D Debenham	413	13.0	−21.0
Conservative	J Sandland	407		
Turnout			43.6	+10.8
Registered electors		7,366		
Labour hold		Swing		
Labour hold		Swing		

=== Blackheath & Lewisham Village ===
Blackheath & Lewisham Village (3 seats)
Party	Candidate	Votes	%	±%
Labour	R Godsiff	2,764	51.1	+27.6
Labour	R Stockbridge	2,740		
Labour	A Watts	2,710		
Conservative	A Mason	2,062	38.1	−28.5
Conservative	G Copland	2,054		
Conservative	R Wells	1,996		
Liberal	L Spicer	499	9.2	+2.7
Liberal	C Hyde-Smith	476		
Liberal	D Staley	464		
Independent	B Ward	84	1.6	N/A
Turnout			48.2	+6.4
Registered electors		11,180		
Labour gain from Conservative		Swing		
Labour gain from Conservative		Swing		
Labour gain from Conservative		Swing		

=== Brockley ===
Brockley (3 seats)
Party	Candidate	Votes	%	±%
Labour	J Wheeler	2,727	56.7	+25.6
Labour	A Theobald	2,675		
Labour	A Kaye	2,666		
Conservative	M Snowdon	2,084	31.1	−25.6
Conservative	J Bundock	2,040		
Conservative	M Baker	2,038		
Turnout			47.5	+8.8
Registered electors		10,279		
Labour gain from Conservative		Swing		
Labour gain from Conservative		Swing		
Labour gain from Conservative		Swing		

=== Culverley ===
Culverley (2 seats)
Party	Candidate	Votes	%	±%
Conservative	A Dean	1,617	55.2	−25.2
Conservative	P Philpot	1,563		
Labour	D Palmer	1,136	38.8	+19.2
Labour	Paul Fletcher-Tomenius	1,121		
Liberal	C Morris	126	4.3	N/A
Communist	R Bowden	49	1.7	N/A
Turnout			42.9	+4.2
Registered electors		6,665		
Conservative hold		Swing		
Conservative hold		Swing		

=== Deptford ===
Deptford (3 seats)
Party	Candidate	Votes	%	±%
Labour	Robert Lowe	2,281	84.2	+29.7
Labour	A Newman	2,238		
Labour	G Baker	2,054		
Conservative	D Barker	428	15.8	−16.7
Conservative	D Riley	203		
Conservative	F Cunningham	190		
Turnout			33.9	+11.8
Registered electors		7,676		
Labour hold		Swing		
Labour hold		Swing		
Labour hold		Swing		

=== Drake ===
Drake (3 seats)
Party	Candidate	Votes	%	±%
Labour	R Davies	1,948	63.0	+31.4
Labour	C Cole	1,901		
Labour	A Scutt	1,867		
Conservative	C Cross	1,145	37.0	−26.3
Conservative	P McCallum	1,052		
Conservative	E Tasker	1,024		
Turnout			30.2	+2.6
Registered electors		10,351		
Labour gain from Conservative		Swing		
Labour gain from Conservative		Swing		
Labour gain from Conservative		Swing		

=== Forest Hill ===
Forest Hill (3 seats)
Party	Candidate	Votes	%	±%
Labour	R Mooney	2,484	52.1	+27.8
Labour	W Simson	2,443		
Labour	K Thomas	999		
Conservative	R Bartlett	2,284	47.9	−15.5
Conservative	N Banks	2,262		
Conservative	D Dear	2,256		
Turnout			46.0	+2.9
Registered electors		10,565		
Labour gain from Conservative		Swing		
Labour gain from Conservative		Swing		
Labour gain from Conservative		Swing		

=== Grinling Gibbons ===
Grinling Gibbons (3 seats)
Party	Candidate	Votes	%	±%
Labour	C Fordham	1,683	84.0	+54.1
Labour	N Gregory	1,649		
Labour	A Groves	1,616		
Conservative	V Davis	237	11.8	−29.8
Conservative	J Hayward	223		
Conservative	R Mepsted	213		
Communist	J Tierney	83	4.1	−4.7
Turnout			23.3	+6.4
Registered electors		8,677		
Labour hold		Swing		
Labour hold		Swing		
Labour hold		Swing		

=== Grove Park ===
Grove Park (2 seats)
Party	Candidate	Votes	%	±%
Labour	Frederick Winslade	2,639	92.5	+18.0
Labour	T Bradley	2,532		
Conservative	E Burleigh	215	25.5	−18.0
Conservative	R Brighton	211		
Turnout			44.6	+16.3
Registered electors		6,442		
Labour hold		Swing		
Labour hold		Swing		

=== Honor Oak Park ===
Honor Oak Park (3 seats)
Party	Candidate	Votes	%	±%
Labour	J Donovan	2,424	50.6	+4.3
Labour	C Eve	2,394		
Labour	A Jinkinson	2,364		
Conservative	G Agar	2,130	44.3	−24.4
Conservative	H Thompson	2,117		
Conservative	M Wheeler	2,113		
Communist	M Robinson	233	4.9	−.01
Turnout			41.9	+2.8
Registered electors		11,254		
Labour gain from Conservative		Swing		
Labour gain from Conservative		Swing		
Labour gain from Conservative		Swing		

=== Ladywell ===
Ladywell (3 seats)
Party	Candidate	Votes	%	±%
Conservative	J Earl	2,307	57.3	+20.0
Conservative	D Dear	2,292		
Conservative	G Protz	2,221		
Labour	J Haynes	1,344	33.4	−18.1
Labour	L Moody	1,287		
Labour	N Taylor	1,261		
Liberal	F Jeremiah	305	7.6	±0.0
Liberal	B Steele	280		
Liberal	I Senior	249		
Communist	R Toms	68	1.7	−1.8
Turnout			39.7	−0.4
Registered electors		10,081		
Conservative gain from Labour		Swing		
Conservative gain from Labour		Swing		
Conservative gain from Labour		Swing		

=== Lewisham Park ===
Lewisham Park (3 seats)
Party	Candidate	Votes	%	±%
Conservative	G Chandler	2,086	54.5	+22.6
Conservative	P Philpot	2,057		
Conservative	J Cattini	2,032		
Labour	R Pepper	1,408	36.8	−14.6
Labour	E Richards	1,319		
Labour	E Walker	1,312		
Liberal	J Edwards	246	6.4	+8.3
Liberal	R Grundon	183		
Liberal	D Ruel-Bentall	159		
Communist	T White	85	2.2	+0.1
Turnout			36.5	−4.0
Registered electors		10,276		
Conservative gain from Labour		Swing		
Conservative gain from Labour		Swing		
Conservative gain from Labour		Swing		

=== Manor Lee ===
Manor Lee (2 seats)
Party	Candidate	Votes	%	±%
Conservative	P Silk	1,853	62.6	+22.5
Conservative	K Collins	1,775		
Labour	A McMurtrie	857	28.9	−20.8
Labour	J Damer	850		
Liberal	R Nathan	251	8.5	−1.7
Liberal	M. Cooper	206		
Turnout			47.5	+2.3
Registered electors		6,217		
Conservative gain from Labour		Swing		
Conservative gain from Labour		Swing		

=== Marlowe ===
Marlowe (3 seats)
Party	Candidate	Votes	%	±%
Labour	F Keep	830	57.7	−28.3
Labour	Ernest Rowing	800		
Labour	J Warnes	778		
Conservative	J Noble	608	42.3	+31.5
Conservative	A Pinnell	588		
Conservative	F Chappell	586		
Turnout			16.5	+4.9
Registered electors		8,960		
Labour hold		Swing		
Labour hold		Swing		
Labour hold		Swing		

=== Pepys ===
Pepys (3 seats)
Party	Candidate	Votes	%	±%
Conservative	R McCarron	1,567	58.5	+39.9
Conservative	J Latuskie	1,552		
Conservative	I Caulfield	1,509		
Labour	C Cole	970	36.2	−30.4
Labour	C Cook	949		
Labour	C Wilkinson	938		
Communist	V Fineman	143	5.3	N/A
Turnout			28.5	+3.6
Registered electors		9,263		
Conservative gain from Labour		Swing		
Conservative gain from Labour		Swing		
Conservative gain from Labour		Swing		

=== Rushey Green ===
Rushey Green (2 seats)
Party	Candidate	Votes	%	±%
Conservative	A Pearson	1,037	51.3	+26.2
Conservative	T Yard	1,024		
Labour	A Patterson	758	37.5	−26.5
Labour	J Donovan	720		
Liberal	J Eagle	225	11.1	+0.2
Liberal	D Good	217		
Turnout			31.5	±0.0
Registered electors		6,465		
Conservative gain from Labour		Swing		
Conservative gain from Labour		Swing		

=== St Andrew ===
St Andrew (2 seats)
Party	Candidate	Votes	%	±%
Conservative	P Gaywood	2,052	67.6	+27.3
Conservative	H Talbot	2,036		
Labour	P Bellinger	982	32.4	−8.3
Labour	A Boon	955		
Turnout			49.9	+1.4
Registered electors		6,139		
Conservative gain from Labour		Swing		
Conservative gain from Labour		Swing		

=== St Mildred Lee ===
St Mildred Lee (2 seats)
Party	Candidate	Votes	%	±%
Conservative	D Kerven	2,322	77.6	+19.0
Conservative	L Silk	2,310		
Labour	R Dennis	670	22.4	−8.4
Labour	F Smith	667		
Turnout			51.0	+9.1
Registered electors		5,915		
Conservative hold		Swing		
Conservative hold		Swing		

=== South Lee ===
South Lee (2 seats)
Party	Candidate	Votes	%	±%
Conservative	G Manners	1,871	64.4	+29.6
Conservative	S Troy	1,853		
Labour	N Filtness	1,034	35.6	−19.6
Labour	L Barnes	970		
Turnout			33.5	+10.0
Registered electors		6,534		
Conservative gain from Labour		Swing		
Conservative gain from Labour		Swing		

=== Southend ===
Southend (3 seats)
Party	Candidate	Votes	%	±%
Labour	Phil Gorin	1,836	53.6	−13.8
Labour	D Hurren	1,790		
Labour	J Hurren	1,754		
Conservative	A Hawes	1,591	46.4	+29.9
Conservative	D Epps	1,587		
Conservative	J Seabourne	1,567		
Turnout			46.1	+11.8
Registered electors		6,332		
Labour hold		Swing		
Labour hold		Swing		
Labour hold		Swing		

=== Sydenham East ===
Sydenham East (3 seats)
Party	Candidate	Votes	%	±%
Conservative	William Bridger	2,517	58.9	+15.1
Conservative	E Bridger	2,480		
Conservative	M Winn	2,438		
Labour	Alan Pegg	1,262	29.5	−14.9
Labour	J Lynch	1,223		
Labour	R Trevor	1,197		
Liberal	M Weaver	313	7.3	−1.3
Liberal	L Marchant	300		
Liberal	D Birtchnell	194		
Communist	I Jerrom	182	4.3	+1.2
Turnout			38.7	+0.9
Registered electors		10,790		
Conservative gain from Labour		Swing		
Conservative gain from Labour		Swing		
Conservative hold		Swing		

=== Sydenham West ===
Sydenham West (3 seats)
Party	Candidate	Votes	%	±%
Conservative	J Switzer	2,493	69.1	+22.8
Conservative	D New	2,486		
Conservative	G Daters	2,480		
Labour	M Goldstein	945	26.2	−14.7
Labour	A Kaye	888		
Labour	A Levene	884		
Communist	J Kingsford	83	4.7	+1.9
Turnout			36.4	+2.8
Registered electors		9,657		
Conservative hold		Swing		
Conservative hold		Swing		
Conservative hold		Swing		

=== Whitefoot ===
Whitefoot (2 seats)
Party	Candidate	Votes	%	±%
Conservative	P Sims	1,392	53.7	+33.5
Conservative	R Wells	1,371		
Labour	J Henry	1,115	43.1	−23.6
Labour	F Hawes	1,085		
Communist	T Brewer	171	4.7	+2.6
Turnout			42.0	+4.8
Registered electors		6,162		
Conservative gain from Labour		Swing		
Conservative gain from Labour		Swing		
