= 1974 Lewisham London Borough Council election =

Elections to Lewisham London Borough Council were held in May 1974. The whole council was up for election. Turnout was 33.8%. This election had aldermen as well as councillors. Labour got all ten aldermen.

== Election result ==
Lewisham local election result 1974
Party	Seats	Gains	Losses	Net gain/loss	Seats %	Votes %	Votes	+/−
Labour	59					53.4		
Conservative	11					34.7		
Liberal	0				0.0	9.3		

== Ward results ==
Bellingham (2)
Party	Candidate	Votes	%	±%

Blackheath & Lewisham Village (3)
Party	Candidate	Votes	%	±%

Crofton Park (3)
Party	Candidate	Votes	%	±%

Culverley (2)
Party	Candidate	Votes	%	±%

Deptford (3)
Party	Candidate	Votes	%	±%

Drake (3)
Party	Candidate	Votes	%	±%

Forest Hill (3)
Party	Candidate	Votes	%	±%

Grinling Gibbons (3)
Party	Candidate	Votes	%	±%

Grove Park (2)
Party	Candidate	Votes	%	±%

Honor Oak Park (3)
Party	Candidate	Votes	%	±%

Ladywell (3)
Party	Candidate	Votes	%	±%

Lewisham Park (3)
Party	Candidate	Votes	%	±%

Manor Lee (2)
Party	Candidate	Votes	%	±%

Marlowe (3)
Party	Candidate	Votes	%	±%

Pepys (3)
Party	Candidate	Votes	%	±%

Rushey Green (2)
Party	Candidate	Votes	%	±%

St Andrew (2)
Party	Candidate	Votes	%	±%

St Mildred Lee (2)
Party	Candidate	Votes	%	±%

South Lee (2)
Party	Candidate	Votes	%	±%

Southend (3)
Party	Candidate	Votes	%	±%

Sydenham East (3)
Party	Candidate	Votes	%	±%

Sydenham West (3)
Party	Candidate	Votes	%	±%

Whitefoot (2)
Party	Candidate	Votes	%	±%
