= 1968 Lewisham London Borough Council election =

Elections to Lewisham London Borough Council were held in May 1968. The whole council was up for election. Turnout was 34.4%. This election had aldermen as well as councillors. Labour and the Conservatives each got five aldermen. As of the 2022 elections, this election was the last time the Conservatives controlled Lewisham Borough Council.

== Election result ==
Lewisham local election result 1968
Party	Seats	Gains	Losses	Net gain/loss	Seats %	Votes %	Votes	+/−
Conservative	49	32	0	+32	70.0	59.6		
Labour	21	0	32	-32	30.0	35.0		
Liberal	0	0	0	±0.0	0.0	2.9		

== Results by ward ==
=== Bellingham ===
Bellingham (2 seats)
Party	Candidate	Votes	%	±%
Labour	Stanley Hardy	1,505	66.0	−12.9
Labour	S Burlison	1,472		
Conservative	R Debenham	774	34.0	+25.8
Conservative	M Baker	753		
Turnout			32.8	+3.0
Registered electors		7,009		
Labour hold		Swing		
Labour hold		Swing		

=== Blackheath & Lewisham Village ===
Blackheath & Lewisham Village (3 seats)
Party	Candidate	Votes	%	±%
Conservative	G Copland	2,970	66.6	+18.6
Conservative	A Mason	2,929		
Conservative	F Mulligan	2,917		
Labour	P McNally	1,048	23.5	−19.6
Labour	J Arkle	1,021		
Labour	J Wusteman	973		
Liberal	M Helliwell	292	6.5	−2.4
Liberal	L Dowds	278		
Liberal	D Staley	224		
Communist	M Power	151	3.4	N/A
Turnout			41.8	−1.3
Registered electors		10,426		
Conservative hold		Swing		
Conservative hold		Swing		
Conservative hold		Swing		

=== Brockley ===
Brockley (3 seats)
Party	Candidate	Votes	%	±%
Conservative	T Pickup	2,713	68.9	+25.1
Conservative	J Hainsworth	2,704		
Conservative	I Turner	2,665		
Labour	P Forward	1,222	31.1	−14.5
Labour	D Cox	1,221		
Labour	T Bradley	1,185		
Turnout			38.7	−0.3
Registered electors		10,327		
Conservative gain from Labour		Swing		
Conservative gain from Labour		Swing		
Conservative gain from Labour		Swing		

=== Culverley ===
Culverley (2 seats)
Party	Candidate	Votes	%	±%
Conservative	A Dean	2,286	80.4	+22.4
Conservative	A Pinnegar	2,264		
Labour	P Braithwaite	557	19.6	−7.2
Labour	D Eagles	552		
Turnout			45.0	+4.4
Registered electors		6,398		
Conservative hold		Swing		
Conservative hold		Swing		

=== Deptford ===
Deptford (3 seats)
Party	Candidate	Votes	%	±%
Labour	Robert Lowe	846	54.5	−32.4
Labour	A Scutt	801		
Labour	T Agambar	775		
Conservative	E Green	505	32.5	+20.3
Conservative	D Nicholls	496		
Conservative	S Hickisson	496		
Independent	M Collins	201	13.0	N/A
Turnout			22.1	+1.9
Registered electors		6,552		
Labour hold		Swing		
Labour hold		Swing		
Labour hold		Swing		

=== Drake ===
Drake (3 seats)
Party	Candidate	Votes	%	±%
Conservative	W Brydon	1,753	63.3	+23.8
Conservative	L Cornford	1,720		
Conservative	C Cross	1,714		
Labour	W Barrett	875	31.6	−18.2
Labour	A Mayer	850		
Labour	H Bacon	842		
Union Movement	A Nicholson	140	5.1	N/A
Turnout			27.6	−0.1
Registered electors		9,915		
Conservative gain from Labour		Swing		
Conservative gain from Labour		Swing		
Conservative gain from Labour		Swing		

=== Forest Hill ===
Forest Hill (3 seats)
Party	Candidate	Votes	%	±%
Conservative	R Bartlett	2,758	63.4	+20.3
Conservative	N Banks	2,756		
Conservative	C Costello	2,712		
Labour	R Mooney	1,059	24.3	−19.0
Labour	Roger Godsiff	1,024		
Labour	R White	999		
Liberal	H Beecher	422	9.7	−2.3
Liberal	F Shine	388		
Liberal	B Small	373		
Communist	R Bowden	111	2.6	+1.0
Turnout			43.1	+1.1
Registered electors		9,968		
Conservative gain from Labour		Swing		
Conservative gain from Labour		Swing		
Conservative hold		Swing		

=== Grinling Gibbons ===
Grinling Gibbons (3 seats)
Party	Candidate	Votes	%	±%
Labour	C Fordham	835	49.6	−29.4
Labour	C Goldthorp	819		
Labour	W Hall	788		
Conservative	J Smith	701	41.6	+25.7
Conservative	M Lane	663		
Conservative	D Barker	642		
Communist	J Tierney	148	8.8	+3.3
Turnout			16.9	−0.3
Registered electors		9,730		
Labour hold		Swing		
Labour hold		Swing		
Labour hold		Swing		

=== Grove Park ===
Grove Park (2 seats)
Party	Candidate	Votes	%	±%
Labour	W Holmes	1,288	74.5	−10.6
Labour	Frederick Winslade	1,277		
Conservative	J Heath	440	25.5	+20.7
Conservative	E Dickinson	437		
Turnout			28.3	−6.7
Registered electors		6,227		
Labour hold		Swing		
Labour hold		Swing		

=== Honor Oak Park ===
Honor Oak Park (3 seats)
Party	Candidate	Votes	%	±%
Conservative	H Eames	2,983	68.7	+13.0
Conservative	F Judge	2,952		
Conservative	H Thompson	2,833		
Labour	J Dare	1,140	26.3	−14.4
Labour	N Thomas	1,139		
Labour	J Richards	1,121		
Communist	M Robinson	217	5.0	+1.4
Turnout			39.1	+2.9
Registered electors		10,845		
Conservative hold		Swing		
Conservative hold		Swing		
Conservative hold		Swing		

=== Ladywell ===
Ladywell (3 seats)
Party	Candidate	Votes	%	±%
Conservative	J Earl	2,307	57.3	+20.0
Conservative	D Dear	2,292		
Conservative	G Protz	2,221		
Labour	J Haynes	1,344	33.4	−18.1
Labour	L Moody	1,287		
Labour	N Taylor	1,261		
Liberal	F Jeremiah	305	7.6	±0.0
Liberal	B Steele	280		
Liberal	I Senior	249		
Communist	R Toms	68	1.7	−1.8
Turnout			39.7	−0.4
Registered electors		10,081		
Conservative gain from Labour		Swing		
Conservative gain from Labour		Swing		
Conservative gain from Labour		Swing		

=== Lewisham Park ===
Lewisham Park (3 seats)
Party	Candidate	Votes	%	±%
Conservative	G Chandler	2,086	54.5	+22.6
Conservative	P Philpot	2,057		
Conservative	J Cattini	2,032		
Labour	R Pepper	1,408	36.8	−14.6
Labour	E Richards	1,319		
Labour	E Walker	1,312		
Liberal	J Edwards	246	6.4	+8.3
Liberal	R Grundon	183		
Liberal	D Ruel-Bentall	159		
Communist	T White	85	2.2	+0.1
Turnout			36.5	−4.0
Registered electors		10,276		
Conservative gain from Labour		Swing		
Conservative gain from Labour		Swing		
Conservative gain from Labour		Swing		

=== Manor Lee ===
Manor Lee (2 seats)
Party	Candidate	Votes	%	±%
Conservative	P Silk	1,853	62.6	+22.5
Conservative	K Collins	1,775		
Labour	A McMurtrie	857	28.9	−20.8
Labour	J Damer	850		
Liberal	R Nathan	251	8.5	−1.7
Liberal	M. Cooper	206		
Turnout			47.5	+2.3
Registered electors		6,217		
Conservative gain from Labour		Swing		
Conservative gain from Labour		Swing		

=== Marlowe ===
Marlowe (3 seats)
Party	Candidate	Votes	%	±%
Labour	F Keep	830	57.7	−28.3
Labour	Ernest Rowing	800		
Labour	J Warnes	778		
Conservative	J Noble	608	42.3	+31.5
Conservative	A Pinnell	588		
Conservative	F Chappell	586		
Turnout			16.5	+4.9
Registered electors		8,960		
Labour hold		Swing		
Labour hold		Swing		
Labour hold		Swing		

=== Pepys ===
Pepys (3 seats)
Party	Candidate	Votes	%	±%
Conservative	R McCarron	1,567	58.5	+39.9
Conservative	J Latuskie	1,552		
Conservative	I Caulfield	1,509		
Labour	C Cole	970	36.2	−30.4
Labour	C Cook	949		
Labour	C Wilkinson	938		
Communist	V Fineman	143	5.3	N/A
Turnout			28.5	+3.6
Registered electors		9,263		
Conservative gain from Labour		Swing		
Conservative gain from Labour		Swing		
Conservative gain from Labour		Swing		

=== Rushey Green ===
Rushey Green (2 seats)
Party	Candidate	Votes	%	±%
Conservative	A Pearson	1,037	51.3	+26.2
Conservative	T Yard	1,024		
Labour	A Patterson	758	37.5	−26.5
Labour	J Donovan	720		
Liberal	J Eagle	225	11.1	+0.2
Liberal	D Good	217		
Turnout			31.5	±0.0
Registered electors		6,465		
Conservative gain from Labour		Swing		
Conservative gain from Labour		Swing		

=== St Andrew ===
St Andrew (2 seats)
Party	Candidate	Votes	%	±%
Conservative	P Gaywood	2,052	67.6	+27.3
Conservative	H Talbot	2,036		
Labour	P Bellinger	982	32.4	−8.3
Labour	A Boon	955		
Turnout			49.9	+1.4
Registered electors		6,139		
Conservative gain from Labour		Swing		
Conservative gain from Labour		Swing		

=== St Mildred Lee ===
St Mildred Lee (2 seats)
Party	Candidate	Votes	%	±%
Conservative	D Kerven	2,322	77.6	+19.0
Conservative	L Silk	2,310		
Labour	R Dennis	670	22.4	−8.4
Labour	F Smith	667		
Turnout			51.0	+9.1
Registered electors		5,915		
Conservative hold		Swing		
Conservative hold		Swing		

=== South Lee ===
South Lee (2 seats)
Party	Candidate	Votes	%	±%
Conservative	G Manners	1,871	64.4	+29.6
Conservative	S Troy	1,853		
Labour	N Filtness	1,034	35.6	−19.6
Labour	L Barnes	970		
Turnout			33.5	+10.0
Registered electors		6,534		
Conservative gain from Labour		Swing		
Conservative gain from Labour		Swing		

=== Southend ===
Southend (3 seats)
Party	Candidate	Votes	%	±%
Labour	Phil Gorin	1,836	53.6	−13.8
Labour	D Hurren	1,790		
Labour	J Hurren	1,754		
Conservative	A Hawes	1,591	46.4	+29.9
Conservative	D Epps	1,587		
Conservative	J Seabourne	1,567		
Turnout			46.1	+11.8
Registered electors		6,332		
Labour hold		Swing		
Labour hold		Swing		
Labour hold		Swing		

=== Sydenham East ===
Sydenham East (3 seats)
Party	Candidate	Votes	%	±%
Conservative	William Bridger	2,517	58.9	+15.1
Conservative	E Bridger	2,480		
Conservative	M Winn	2,438		
Labour	Alan Pegg	1,262	29.5	−14.9
Labour	J Lynch	1,223		
Labour	R Trevor	1,197		
Liberal	M Weaver	313	7.3	−1.3
Liberal	L Marchant	300		
Liberal	D Birtchnell	194		
Communist	I Jerrom	182	4.3	+1.2
Turnout			38.7	+0.9
Registered electors		10,790		
Conservative gain from Labour		Swing		
Conservative gain from Labour		Swing		
Conservative hold		Swing		

=== Sydenham West ===
Sydenham West (3 seats)
Party	Candidate	Votes	%	±%
Conservative	J Switzer	2,493	69.1	+22.8
Conservative	D New	2,486		
Conservative	G Daters	2,480		
Labour	M Goldstein	945	26.2	−14.7
Labour	A Kaye	888		
Labour	A Levene	884		
Communist	J Kingsford	83	4.7	+1.9
Turnout			36.4	+2.8
Registered electors		9,657		
Conservative hold		Swing		
Conservative hold		Swing		
Conservative hold		Swing		

=== Whitefoot ===
Whitefoot (2 seats)
Party	Candidate	Votes	%	±%
Conservative	P Sims	1,392	53.7	+33.5
Conservative	R Wells	1,371		
Labour	J Henry	1,115	43.1	−23.6
Labour	F Hawes	1,085		
Communist	T Brewer	171	4.7	+2.6
Turnout			42.0	+4.8
Registered electors		6,162		
Conservative gain from Labour		Swing		
Conservative gain from Labour		Swing		

== By-elections between 1968 and 1971 ==
There were no by-elections.
