= 1964 Lewisham London Borough Council election =

The 1964 Lewisham Council election took place on 7 May 1964 to elect members of Lewisham London Borough Council in London, England. The whole council was up for election and the Labour Party gained control of the council.

== Background ==
These elections were the first to the newly formed borough. Previously elections had taken place in the Metropolitan Borough of Deptford and Metropolitan Borough of Lewisham. These boroughs were joined to form the new London Borough of Lewisham by the London Government Act 1963.

A total of 173 candidates stood in the election for the 60 seats being contested across 23 wards. These included a full slate from the Labour Party, while the Conservative and Liberal parties stood 58 and 46 respectively, and the Communist Party ran 9 candidates. There were 14 three-seat wards and 9 two-seat wards.

This election had aldermen as well as directly elected councillors. Labour got 8 aldermen and the Conservatives 2.

The Council was elected in 1964 as a "shadow authority" but did not start operations until 1 April 1965.

== Election result ==
The results saw Labour gain the new council with a majority of 30 after winning 45 of the 60 seats. Overall turnout in the election was 34.7%. This turnout included 1,396 postal votes.

Lewisham local election result 1964
| Party | Seats | Gains | Losses | Net gain/loss | Seats % | Votes % | Votes | +/− |
|---|---|---|---|---|---|---|---|---|
| Labour | 53 | 53 | 0 | +53 | 75.7 | 53.3 | | N/A |
| Conservative | 17 | 17 | 0 | +17 | 24.3 | 35.7 | | N/A |
| Liberal | 0 | 0 | 0 | ±0.0 | 0.0 | 9.7 | | N/A |
| Communist | 0 | 0 | 0 | ±0.0 | 0.0 | 1.2 | | N/A |

== Results by ward ==
=== Bellingham ===
Bellingham (2 seats)
| Party | Candidate | Votes | % | ±% |
|---|---|---|---|---|
| Labour | E Inch | 1,727 | 78.9 | N/A |
| Labour | R Burlison | 1,667 | | N/A |
| Liberal | L Humber | 282 | 12.9 | N/A |
| Liberal | J Eagle | 259 | | N/A |
| Conservative | P Cook | 179 | 8.2 | N/A |
| Turnout | | 2,135 | 29.8 | N/A |
| Registered electors | | 7,168 | | |
| Labour win (new seat) | | | | |
| Labour win (new seat) | | | | |

=== Blackheath & Lewisham Village ===
Blackheath & Lewisham Village (3 seats)
| Party | Candidate | Votes | % | ±% |
|---|---|---|---|---|
| Conservative | Clifford Combes | 2,158 | 48.0 | N/A |
| Conservative | S Powell | 2,148 | | N/A |
| Conservative | A Mason | 2,103 | | N/A |
| Labour | H Burch | 1,938 | 43.1 | N/A |
| Labour | D Swan | 1,895 | | N/A |
| Labour | J Arkle | 1,885 | | N/A |
| Liberal | A Lloyd-Jones | 400 | 8.9 | N/A |
| Liberal | G Laws | 399 | | N/A |
| Liberal | J Mayo | 394 | | N/A |
| Turnout | | 4,491 | 43.1 | N/A |
| Registered electors | | 10,412 | | |
| Conservative win (new seat) | | | | |
| Conservative win (new seat) | | | | |
| Conservative win (new seat) | | | | |

=== Brockley ===
Brockley (3 seats)
| Party | Candidate | Votes | % | ±% |
|---|---|---|---|---|
| Labour | P Forward | 1,852 | 45.6 | N/A |
| Labour | L Moody | 1,847 | | N/A |
| Labour | J Lynch | 1,827 | | N/A |
| Conservative | A Wilkins | 1,778 | 43.8 | N/A |
| Conservative | W Church | 1,771 | | N/A |
| Conservative | R Groves | 1,739 | | N/A |
| Liberal | S Davies | 427 | 10.5 | N/A |
| Liberal | J Whale | 417 | | N/A |
| Liberal | D Birtchnell | 411 | | N/A |
| Turnout | | 4,081 | 39.0 | N/A |
| Registered electors | | 10,465 | | |
| Labour win (new seat) | | | | |
| Labour win (new seat) | | | | |
| Labour win (new seat) | | | | |

=== Culverley ===
Culverley (2 seats)
| Party | Candidate | Votes | % | ±% |
|---|---|---|---|---|
| Conservative | A Dean | 1,563 | 58.0 | N/A |
| Conservative | A Pinnegar | 1,544 | | N/A |
| Labour | E Hooper | 723 | 26.8 | N/A |
| Labour | F Barrett | 694 | | N/A |
| Liberal | C Harvey | 409 | 15.2 | N/A |
| Liberal | R Dees | 381 | | N/A |
| Turnout | | 2,692 | 40.6 | N/A |
| Registered electors | | 6,629 | | |
| Conservative win (new seat) | | | | |
| Conservative win (new seat) | | | | |

=== Deptford ===
Deptford (3 seats)
| Party | Candidate | Votes | % | ±% |
|---|---|---|---|---|
| Labour | F Keep | 1,330 | 87.9 | N/A |
| Labour | Robert Lowe | 1,321 | | N/A |
| Labour | A Scutt | 1,309 | | N/A |
| Conservative | M Lane | 183 | 12.1 | N/A |
| Conservative | E Winterburn | 172 | | N/A |
| Conservative | E Keable | 167 | | N/A |
| Turnout | | 1,538 | 20.3 | N/A |
| Registered electors | | 7,591 | | |
| Labour win (new seat) | | | | |
| Labour win (new seat) | | | | |
| Labour win (new seat) | | | | |

=== Drake ===
Drake (3 seats)
| Party | Candidate | Votes | % | ±% |
|---|---|---|---|---|
| Labour | A Bullen | 1,436 | 49.8 | N/A |
| Labour | F Pennington | 1,411 | | N/A |
| Labour | William Hall | 1,396 | | N/A |
| Conservative | E Pease | 1,141 | 39.5 | N/A |
| Conservative | A Preston | 1,108 | | N/A |
| Conservative | A Hichisson | 1,093 | | N/A |
| Liberal | P Boulton | 308 | 10.7 | N/A |
| Liberal | H Anderson | 305 | | N/A |
| Liberal | D Hughes | 295 | | N/A |
| Turnout | | 2,904 | 27.7 | N/A |
| Registered electors | | 10,471 | | |
| Labour win (new seat) | | | | |
| Labour win (new seat) | | | | |
| Labour win (new seat) | | | | |

=== Forest Hill ===
Forest Hill (3 seats)
| Party | Candidate | Votes | % | ±% |
|---|---|---|---|---|
| Labour | R Mooney | 1,925 | 43.3 | N/A |
| Labour | H Brett | 1,921 | | N/A |
| Conservative | R Bartlett | 1,917 | 43.1 | N/A |
| Labour | Harry West | 1,911 | | N/A |
| Conservative | C Costello | 1,907 | | N/A |
| Conservative | N Banks | 1,895 | | N/A |
| Liberal | H Beecher | 534 | 12.0 | N/A |
| Liberal | B Small | 521 | | N/A |
| Liberal | L Marchant | 486 | | N/A |
| Communist | R Bowden | 69 | 1.6 | N/A |
| Turnout | | 4,429 | 42.0 | N/A |
| Registered electors | | 10,555 | | |
| Labour win (new seat) | | | | |
| Labour win (new seat) | | | | |
| Conservative win (new seat) | | | | |

=== Grinling Gibbons ===
Grinling Gibbons (3 seats)
| Party | Candidate | Votes | % | ±% |
|---|---|---|---|---|
| Labour | C Fordham | 1,428 | 79.0 | N/A |
| Labour | A Groves | 1,397 | | N/A |
| Labour | T Keep | 1,386 | | N/A |
| Conservative | J Smith | 288 | 15.9 | N/A |
| Conservative | W Davis | 285 | | N/A |
| Conservative | W Judges | 280 | | N/A |
| Communist | J Tierney | 92 | 5.1 | N/A |
| Turnout | | 1,771 | 17.2 | N/A |
| Registered electors | | 10,278 | | |
| Labour win (new seat) | | | | |
| Labour win (new seat) | | | | |
| Labour win (new seat) | | | | |

=== Grove Park ===
Grove Park (2 seats)
| Party | Candidate | Votes | % | ±% |
|---|---|---|---|---|
| Labour | Frederick Winslade | 1,954 | 85.1 | N/A |
| Labour | W Holmes | 1,914 | | N/A |
| Liberal | W Woodley | 230 | 10.0 | N/A |
| Liberal | H White | 184 | | N/A |
| Conservative | W Saunders | 111 | 4.8 | N/A |
| Turnout | | 2,272 | 35.0 | N/A |
| Registered electors | | 6,478 | | |
| Labour win (new seat) | | | | |
| Labour win (new seat) | | | | |

=== Honor Oak Park ===
Honor Oak Park (3 seats)
| Party | Candidate | Votes | % | ±% |
|---|---|---|---|---|
| Conservative | H Eames | 2,170 | 55.7 | N/A |
| Conservative | F Judge | 2,165 | | N/A |
| Conservative | G Land | 2,159 | | N/A |
| Labour | W Cove | 1,584 | 40.7 | N/A |
| Labour | W Coventry | 1,572 | | N/A |
| Labour | J Pease | 1,503 | | N/A |
| Communist | G Bonner | 141 | 3.6 | N/A |
| Turnout | | 3,814 | 36.2 | N/A |
| Registered electors | | 10,546 | | |
| Conservative win (new seat) | | | | |
| Conservative win (new seat) | | | | |
| Conservative win (new seat) | | | | |

=== Ladywell ===
Ladywell (3 seats)
| Party | Candidate | Votes | % | ±% |
|---|---|---|---|---|
| Labour | J Broome | 2,100 | 51.5 | N/A |
| Labour | J Sandbach | 2,088 | | N/A |
| Labour | K Butler | 2,086 | | N/A |
| Conservative | A Hipperson | 1,520 | 37.3 | N/A |
| Conservative | F Mobbs | 1,499 | | N/A |
| Conservative | S Barker | 1,490 | | N/A |
| Liberal | B Dohoo | 310 | 7.6 | N/A |
| Liberal | H Dohoo | 304 | | N/A |
| Liberal | V Evans | 303 | | N/A |
| Communist | D Barber | 144 | 3.5 | N/A |
| Turnout | | 4,022 | 38.1 | N/A |
| Registered electors | | 10,560 | | |
| Labour win (new seat) | | | | |
| Labour win (new seat) | | | | |
| Labour win (new seat) | | | | |

=== Lewisham Park ===
Lewisham Park (3 seats)
| Party | Candidate | Votes | % | ±% |
|---|---|---|---|---|
| Labour | F Page | 2,337 | 51.4 | N/A |
| Labour | A Hawkins | 2,037 | | N/A |
| Labour | R Pepper | 2,023 | | N/A |
| Conservative | E Lubbock | 1,448 | 31.9 | N/A |
| Conservative | D Munro | 1,437 | | N/A |
| Conservative | A Page | 1,134 | | N/A |
| Liberal | N Cutler | 666 | 14.7 | N/A |
| Liberal | J Bailey | 628 | | N/A |
| Liberal | E Smith | 605 | | N/A |
| Communist | H Early | 95 | 2.1 | N/A |
| Turnout | | 4,200 | 40.5 | N/A |
| Registered electors | | 10,365 | | |
| Labour win (new seat) | | | | |
| Labour win (new seat) | | | | |
| Labour win (new seat) | | | | |

=== Manor Lee ===
Manor Lee (2 seats)
| Party | Candidate | Votes | % | ±% |
|---|---|---|---|---|
| Labour | E Richards | 1,488 | 49.7 | N/A |
| Labour | J Murphy | 1,486 | | N/A |
| Conservative | A Spurr | 1,199 | 40.1 | N/A |
| Conservative | E Draper | 1,193 | | N/A |
| Liberal | R Nathan | 305 | 10.2 | N/A |
| Liberal | J Rainey | 259 | | N/A |
| Turnout | | 3,007 | 45.2 | N/A |
| Registered electors | | 6,658 | | |
| Labour win (new seat) | | | | |
| Labour win (new seat) | | | | |

=== Marlowe ===
Marlowe (3 seats)
| Party | Candidate | Votes | % | ±% |
|---|---|---|---|---|
| Labour | C Cook | 1,871 | 86.0 | N/A |
| Labour | John Day | 1,857 | | N/A |
| Labour | Ernest Rowing | 1,830 | | N/A |
| Conservative | D Nichols | 234 | 10.8 | N/A |
| Conservative | F Chappell | 220 | | N/A |
| Conservative | F Ching | 199 | | N/A |
| Communist | L Stannard | 71 | 3.3 | N/A |
| Turnout | | 2,173 | 21.4 | N/A |
| Registered electors | | 10,146 | | |
| Labour win (new seat) | | | | |
| Labour win (new seat) | | | | |
| Labour win (new seat) | | | | |

=== Pepys ===
Pepys (3 seats)
| Party | Candidate | Votes | % | ±% |
|---|---|---|---|---|
| Labour | Thomas Bradley | 1,725 | 66.6 | N/A |
| Labour | F Bullion | 1,723 | | N/A |
| Labour | C Cole | | | N/A |
| Conservative | D Barker | 481 | 18.6 | N/A |
| Conservative | D Judges | 460 | | N/A |
| Conservative | W Preston | 457 | | N/A |
| Liberal | H Luck | 386 | 14.9 | N/A |
| Liberal | V Luck | 361 | | N/A |
| Liberal | A Sumption | 353 | | N/A |
| Turnout | | 2,617 | 24.9 | N/A |
| Registered electors | | 10,519 | | |
| Labour win (new seat) | | | | |
| Labour win (new seat) | | | | |
| Labour win (new seat) | | | | |

=== Rushey Green ===
Rushey Green (2 seats)
| Party | Candidate | Votes | % | ±% |
|---|---|---|---|---|
| Labour | J Donovan | 1,446 | 64.0 | N/A |
| Labour | A Patterson | 1,409 | | N/A |
| Conservative | A Pritchett | 566 | 25.1 | N/A |
| Conservative | J Ayling | 549 | | N/A |
| Liberal | S Hasler | 246 | 10.9 | N/A |
| Liberal | L Stringer | 234 | | N/A |
| Turnout | | 2,260 | 31.5 | N/A |
| Registered electors | | 7,166 | | |
| Labour win (new seat) | | | | |
| Labour win (new seat) | | | | |

=== St Andrew ===
St Andrew (2 seats)
| Party | Candidate | Votes | % | ±% |
|---|---|---|---|---|
| Labour | H Boon | 1,244 | 40.7 | N/A |
| Labour | P Bellinger | 1,243 | | N/A |
| Conservative | D Epps | 1,232 | 40.3 | N/A |
| Conservative | D Coombs | 1,227 | | N/A |
| Liberal | S Bennett | 580 | 19.0 | N/A |
| Liberal | W Vivian | 542 | | N/A |
| Turnout | | 3,069 | 48.5 | N/A |
| Registered electors | | 6,330 | | |
| Labour win (new seat) | | | | |
| Labour win (new seat) | | | | |

=== St Mildred Lee ===
St Mildred Lee (2 seats)
| Party | Candidate | Votes | % | ±% |
|---|---|---|---|---|
| Conservative | E Whetnall | 1,550 | 58.6 | N/A |
| Conservative | F Gander | 1,544 | | N/A |
| Labour | J Rushby | 816 | 30.8 | N/A |
| Labour | E Knight | 815 | | N/A |
| Liberal | D Morgan | 280 | 10.6 | N/A |
| Liberal | R Moore | 278 | | N/A |
| Turnout | | 2,660 | 41.9 | N/A |
| Registered electors | | 6,344 | | |
| Conservative win (new seat) | | | | |
| Conservative win (new seat) | | | | |

=== South Lee ===
South Lee (2 seats)
| Party | Candidate | Votes | % | ±% |
|---|---|---|---|---|
| Labour | D Eagles | 1,455 | 55.2 | N/A |
| Labour | N Filtness | 1,436 | | N/A |
| Conservative | D Clauson | 1,181 | 44.8 | N/A |
| Conservative | M Goss | 1,178 | | N/A |
| Turnout | | 2,647 | 43.5 | N/A |
| Registered electors | | 6,085 | | |
| Labour win (new seat) | | | | |
| Labour win (new seat) | | | | |

=== Southend ===
Southend (3 seats)
| Party | Candidate | Votes | % | ±% |
|---|---|---|---|---|
| Labour | Frederick Fisk | 2,672 | 67.4 | N/A |
| Labour | Phil Gorin | 2,646 | | N/A |
| Labour | D Hurren | 2,360 | | N/A |
| Conservative | J Jeffrey | 654 | 16.5 | N/A |
| Conservative | A Littel | 642 | | N/A |
| Liberal | J Hulian | 636 | 16.1 | N/A |
| Conservative | R Mabey | 630 | | N/A |
| Liberal | J Luff | 353 | | N/A |
| Liberal | J Barrington | 297 | | N/A |
| Turnout | | 3,679 | 34.3 | N/A |
| Registered electors | | 10,721 | | |
| Labour win (new seat) | | | | |
| Labour win (new seat) | | | | |
| Labour win (new seat) | | | | |

=== Sydenham East ===
Sydenham East (3 seats)
| Party | Candidate | Votes | % | ±% |
|---|---|---|---|---|
| Labour | D Cox | 1,804 | 44.4 | N/A |
| Labour | Alan Pegg | | | N/A |
| Conservative | William Bridger | 1,780 | 43.8 | N/A |
| Labour | J Steyne | 1,749 | | N/A |
| Conservative | E Bridger | 1,736 | | N/A |
| Conservative | M Winn | 1,725 | | N/A |
| Liberal | R Putt | 351 | 8.6 | N/A |
| Liberal | K Tucker | 345 | | N/A |
| Liberal | M Weaver | 342 | | N/A |
| Communist | J Delahoy | 125 | 3.1 | N/A |
| Turnout | | 3,977 | 37.8 | N/A |
| Registered electors | | 10,518 | | |
| Labour win (new seat) | | | | |
| Labour win (new seat) | | | | |
| Conservative win (new seat) | | | | |

=== Sydenham West ===
Sydenham West (3 seats)
| Party | Candidate | Votes | % | ±% |
|---|---|---|---|---|
| Conservative | F Miller | 1,538 | 46.3 | N/A |
| Conservative | D New | 1,526 | | N/A |
| Conservative | J Switzer | 1,501 | | N/A |
| Labour | R Stewart | 1,358 | 40.9 | N/A |
| Labour | A Levene | 1,352 | | N/A |
| Labour | A Willan | 1,336 | | N/A |
| Liberal | J Higgins | 336 | 10.1 | N/A |
| Liberal | M Johns | 322 | | N/A |
| Liberal | E Beecher | 284 | | N/A |
| Communist | D Syrett | 92 | 2.8 | N/A |
| Turnout | | 3,262 | 33.6 | N/A |
| Registered electors | | 9,708 | | |
| Conservative win (new seat) | | | | |
| Conservative win (new seat) | | | | |
| Conservative win (new seat) | | | | |

=== Whitefoot ===
Whitefoot (2 seats)
| Party | Candidate | Votes | % | ±% |
|---|---|---|---|---|
| Labour | J Henry | 1,606 | 68.7 | N/A |
| Labour | F Hawes | 1,592 | | N/A |
| Conservative | D Scott | 473 | 20.2 | N/A |
| Conservative | A Pearson | 457 | | N/A |
| Liberal | R Wild | 210 | 9.0 | N/A |
| Liberal | P Buckley | 207 | | N/A |
| Communist | T White | 48 | 2.1 | N/A |
| Turnout | | 2,338 | 37.2 | N/A |
| Registered electors | | 6,290 | | |
| Labour win (new seat) | | | | |
| Labour win (new seat) | | | | |

== By-elections between 1964 and 1968 ==
There were no by-elections.
