= Evelyn (ward) =

Electoral ward in London, England

- Electoral ward for the Lewisham London Borough Council
- Evelyn ward boundaries since 2022
- Borough: Lewisham
- County: Greater London
- Population: 14,435 (2021) (Note: 2021 Census data reported for 2022 ward boundaries)
- Electorate: 9,316 (2022)
- Area: 1.120 square kilometres (0.432 sq mi)

Current electoral ward
- Created: 1978
- Number of members: 3
- Councillors: Will Cooper; Rudi Schmidt; Hau-Yu Tam
- GSS code: E05000443 (2002–2022); E05013721 (2022–present)

Evelyn ward, also known as Evelyn Village, is an electoral ward in the northwest of the London Borough of Lewisham. It covers the northern part of Deptford on the south bank of the River Thames, and is the only Lewisham ward that borders the river. It returns councillors to Lewisham London Borough Council.

== Name ==
It is named after John Evelyn who settled in Deptford with his wife in 1652. Their house, Sayes Court, adjacent to the naval dockyard, was purchased by Evelyn from his father-in-law Sir Richard Browne in 1653 and Evelyn soon began to transform the gardens.

== Lewisham council elections since 2022 ==
There was a revision of ward boundaries in Lewisham in 2022. The Evelyn ward lost territory to Deptford and New Cross Gate wards.

=== 2022 election ===
The election took place on 5 May 2022.

2022 Lewisham London Borough Council election: Evelyn
Party	Candidate	Votes	%	±%
Labour	Will Cooper	1,524	67.3	
Labour	Rudi Schmidt	1,233	54.4	
Labour	Hau-Yu Tam	1,224	54.0	
Green	James Braun	523	23.1	
Green	Keith Chambers	426	18.8	
Green	Julian Himmerich	401	17.7	
Conservative	Karen Lowe	269	11.9	
Conservative	Yan Jiang	255	11.3	
Liberal Democrats	Jem Smith	240	10.6	
Liberal Democrats	Dan Fox-Evans	239	10.5	
Conservative	Tim Reczek	190	8.4	
Liberal Democrats	Peter Wells	156	6.9	
TUSC	Steve Rumney	118	5.2	
Turnout			26.9	
Labour win (new boundaries)				
Labour win (new boundaries)				
Labour win (new boundaries)				

== 2002–2022 Lewisham council elections ==
Evelyn ward boundaries from 2002 to 2022

There was a revision in ward boundaries in Lewisham in 2002.

=== 2019 by-election ===
The by-election took place on 2 May 2019, following the resignation of Alex Feis-Bryce. It was held on the same day as the 2019 Whitefoot by-election.

2019 Evelyn by-election
Party	Candidate	Votes	%	±%
Labour	Lionel Openshaw	1,681		
Green	James Braun	702		
Conservative	Eleanor Reader-Moore	231		
Liberal Democrats	Bunmi Wajero	200		
People Before Profit	Joyce Jacca	151		
UKIP	Richard Day	140		
Women's Equality	Nicke Adebowale	71		
Democrats and Veterans	Matt Jenkins	13		
Turnout				
Labour hold		Swing		

=== 2018 election ===
The election took place on 3 May 2018.

2018 Lewisham London Borough Council election: Evelyn
Party	Candidate	Votes	%	±%
Labour	Caroline Kalu	2,278	59.4	
Labour	Alex Feis-Bryce	2,257	58.9	
Labour	Silvana Kelleher	2,221	57.9	
Green	James Braun	680	17.7	
Liberal Democrats	Marie Belsey	406	10.6	
Conservative	Oliver Kay	395	10.3	
Independent	Joyce Jacca	348	9.1	
Conservative	Robert Taylor	346	9.0	
Conservative	Lynn Walker	309	8.1	
Liberal Democrats	Peter Wells	308	8.0	
Liberal Democrats	Gary Williams	307	8.0	
Duma Polska	Anna Wasylkiewicz	53	1.4	
Majority				
Turnout			30	
Labour hold		Swing		
Labour hold		Swing		
Labour hold		Swing		

=== 2014 election ===
The election took place on 22 May 2014.

=== 2010 election ===
The election on 6 May 2010 took place on the same day as the United Kingdom general election.

=== 2006 election ===
The election took place on 4 May 2006.

2006 Lewisham London Borough Council election: Evelyn
Party	Candidate	Votes	%	±%
Labour	Heidi Alexander	1,317	57.5	
Labour	Samuel Owolabi-Oluyole	1,073		
Labour	Crada Onuegbu	1,021		
Conservative	Rebecca Stevens	347	15.1	
Liberal Democrats	Richard Grainger	326	14.2	
Liberal Democrats	Corina Poore	304		
Green	Hanna Fiegenbaum	301	13.1	
Green	Julian Sanders	301		
Conservative	Lincoln Pedzeni	296		
Liberal Democrats	Charles Turner	278		
Conservative	Pauline Manangazira	263		
Green	Sydney Smith	261		
Turnout			24.1	
Labour hold		Swing		
Labour hold		Swing		
Labour hold		Swing		

=== 2004 by-election ===
The by-election took place on 10 June 2004, following the resignation of Alicia Chater.

2004 Evelyn by-election
Party	Candidate	Votes	%	±%
Labour	Heidi Alexander	1,432		
Conservative	Rebecca B. Stevens	463		
Socialist	Jessica M. Leech	374		
Liberal Democrats	David Edgerton	367		
Green	Robin Altwarg	199		
Turnout				
Labour hold		Swing		

=== 2002 election ===
The election took place on 2 May 2002.
