= Electoral history of Vince Cable =

Vince Cable, MP for Twickenham

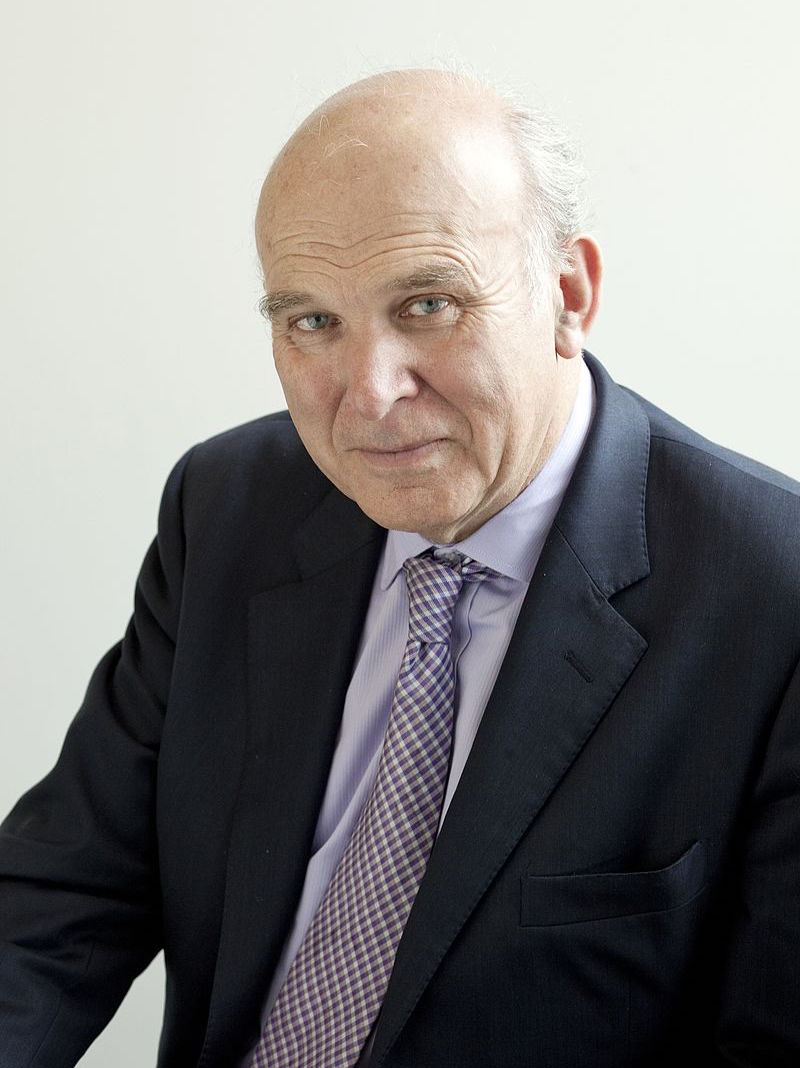

This is a summary of the electoral history of Vince Cable, former Secretary of State for Business, Innovation and Skills and President of the Board of Trade under the Coalition Government of David Cameron, MP for Twickenham 1997 to 2015 and again from 2017 to 2019, and Leader of the Liberal Democrats from 2017 to July 2019.

== Council elections ==
=== 1970 Glasgow Corporation election, Partick West ===
Glasgow Corporation Election 1970: Partick West
| Party | Candidate | Votes | % | ±% |
|---|---|---|---|---|
| Progressives | D. R. Macfarlane | 3,467 | | |
| Labour | J. Cable | 1,333 | | |
| SNP | M. N. Clelland | 710 | | |
| Communist | S. Barr | 97 | | |
| Majority | | 2,134 | | |
| Turnout | | | 41.74 | |
| Registered electors | | 13,433 | | |
| Progressives hold | | Swing | | |

=== 1971 Glasgow Corporation election, Maryhill ===
Glasgow Corporation Election 1971: Maryhill
| Party | Candidate | Votes | % | ±% |
|---|---|---|---|---|
| Labour | J. V. Cable | 5,178 | | |
| Conservative | G. F. Keany | 2,062 | | |
| SNP | T. Murray | 757 | | |
| Turnout | | | 41.61 | |
| Registered electors | | 19,217 | | |
| Labour gain from SNP | | Swing | | |

== Parliamentary elections ==
=== 1970 general election, Glasgow Hillhead ===
General Election 1970: Glasgow Hillhead
| Party | Candidate | Votes | % | ±% |
|---|---|---|---|---|
| Conservative | Tam Galbraith | 14,674 | 61.3 | −1.6 |
| Labour | John Vincent Cable | 7,303 | 30.5 | −6.6 |
| SNP | G Wotherspoon | 1,957 | 8.2 | |
| Majority | | 7,371 | 30.8 | |
| Turnout | | | 69.5 | |
| Conservative hold | | Swing | | |

=== 1983 general election, York ===
General Election 1983: York
| Party | Candidate | Votes | % | ±% |
|---|---|---|---|---|
| Conservative | Conal Gregory | 24,309 | 41.31 | |
| Labour | Alex Lyon | 20,662 | 35.11 | |
| SDP | Vince Cable | 13,523 | 22.98 | |
| Independent | Anthony J. Lister | 204 | 0.35 | |
| BNP | Thomas G. Brattan | 148 | 0.25 | |
| Majority | | 3,647 | 6.20 | |
| Turnout | | | 75.14 | |
| Conservative gain from Labour | | Swing | | |

=== 1987 general election, York ===
General Election 1987: York
| Party | Candidate | Votes | % | ±% |
|---|---|---|---|---|
| Conservative | Conal Gregory | 25,880 | 41.64 | |
| Labour | Hugh Bayley | 25,733 | 41.41 | |
| SDP | Vince Cable | 9,898 | 15.93 | |
| Green | Alan Dunnett | 637 | 1.02 | |
| Majority | | 147 | 0.24 | |
| Turnout | | | 78.37 | |
| Conservative hold | | Swing | | |

=== 1992 general election, Twickenham ===
General Election 1992: Twickenham
| Party | Candidate | Votes | % | ±% |
|---|---|---|---|---|
| Conservative | Toby Jessel | 26,804 | 50.4 | −1.5 |
| Liberal Democrats | Vince Cable | 21,093 | 39.7 | +1.4 |
| Labour | Michael D. Gold | 4,919 | 9.3 | +0.9 |
| Natural Law | Gary P. Gill | 152 | 0.3 | N/A |
| Democratic Liberal and Conservatives | D.W. Griffith | 103 | 0.2 | N/A |
| Liberal | A.J. Miners | 85 | 0.2 | N/A |
| Majority | | 5,711 | 10.7 | −2.8 |
| Turnout | | 53,156 | 84.2 | +2.7 |
| Conservative hold | | Swing | −1.5 | |

=== 1997 general election, Twickenham ===
General Election 1997: Twickenham
| Party | Candidate | Votes | % | ±% |
|---|---|---|---|---|
| Liberal Democrats | Vince Cable | 26,237 | 45.1 | +5.4 |
| Conservative | Toby Jessel | 21,956 | 37.8 | −12.6 |
| Labour | Eva Tutchell | 9,065 | 15.6 | +6.3 |
| Independent English Conservative and Referendum | Jane Harrison | 589 | 1.0 | N/A |
| Rainbow Dream Ticket | Terence D. Haggar | 155 | 0.3 | N/A |
| Natural Law | Anthony J.W. Hardy | 142 | 0.2 | −0.1 |
| Majority | | 4,281 | 7.3 | N/A |
| Turnout | | 58,144 | 79.3 | −4.9 |
| Liberal Democrats gain from Conservative | | Swing | +9.0 | |

=== 2001 general election, Twickenham ===
General Election 2001: Twickenham
| Party | Candidate | Votes | % | ±% |
|---|---|---|---|---|
| Liberal Democrats | Vince Cable | 24,344 | 48.7 | +3.6 |
| Conservative | Nicholas Longworth | 16,689 | 33.4 | −4.3 |
| Labour | Dean Rogers | 6,903 | 13.8 | −1.8 |
| Green | Judith Maciejowska | 1,423 | 2.8 | N/A |
| UKIP | Ray Hollebone | 579 | 1.2 | N/A |
| Majority | | 7,655 | 15.3 | +8.0 |
| Turnout | | 49,938 | 66.4 | −12.6 |
| Liberal Democrats hold | | Swing | +4.0 | |

=== 2005 general election, Twickenham ===
General Election 2005: Twickenham
| Party | Candidate | Votes | % | ±% |
|---|---|---|---|---|
| Liberal Democrats | Vince Cable | 26,696 | 51.6 | +2.9 |
| Conservative | Paul Maynard | 16,731 | 32.4 | −1.0 |
| Labour | Brian Whitington | 5,868 | 11.4 | −2.4 |
| Green | Henry B. Leveson-Gower | 1,445 | 2.8 | 0.0 |
| UKIP | Douglas Orchard | 766 | 1.5 | +0.3 |
| Independent | Brian P. Gibert | 117 | 0.2 | N/A |
| Rainbow Dream Ticket | George Weiss | 64 | 0.1 | N/A |
| Majority | | 9,965 | 19.3 | +4.0 |
| Turnout | | 51,687 | 71.8 | +5.4 |
| Liberal Democrats hold | | Swing | +2.0 | |

=== 2010 general election, Twickenham ===
General Election 2010: Twickenham
| Party | Candidate | Votes | % | ±% |
|---|---|---|---|---|
| Liberal Democrats | Vince Cable | 32,483 | 54.4 | +2.7 |
| Conservative | Deborah Thomas | 20,343 | 34.1 | +1.7 |
| Labour | Brian Tomlinson | 4,583 | 7.7 | −3.7 |
| UKIP | Brian Gilbert | 868 | 1.5 | +0.0 |
| Green | Stephen Roest | 674 | 1.1 | −1.7 |
| BNP | Chris Hurst | 654 | 1.1 | N/A |
| Citizens for Undead Rights and Equality | Harry Cole | 76 | 0.1 | N/A |
| Magna Carta | Paul Armstrong | 40 | 0.0 | N/A |
| Majority | | 12,140 | 20.3 | +1.0 |
| Turnout | | 59,721 | 74.8 | +2.4 |
| Liberal Democrats hold | | Swing | +0.5 | |

=== 2015 general election, Twickenham ===
General Election 2015: Twickenham
| Party | Candidate | Votes | % | ±% |
|---|---|---|---|---|
| Conservative | Tania Mathias | 25,580 | 41.3 | +7.2 |
| Liberal Democrats | Vince Cable | 23,563 | 38.0 | −16.4 |
| Labour | Nick Grant | 7,129 | 11.5 | +3.8 |
| UKIP | Barry Edwards | 3,069 | 4.9 | +3.5 |
| Green | Tanya Williams | 2,463 | 4.0 | +2.8 |
| Christian | Dominic Stockford | 174 | 0.3 | N/A |
| Magna Carta | David Wedgwood | 26 | 0.0 | N/A |
| Majority | | 2,017 | 3.3 | N/A |
| Turnout | | 62,004 | 77.3 | +2.5 |
| Conservative gain from Liberal Democrats | | Swing | +11.8 | |

=== 2017 general election, Twickenham ===
General Election 2017: Twickenham
| Party | Candidate | Votes | % | ±% |
|---|---|---|---|---|
| Liberal Democrats | Vince Cable | 34,969 | 52.8 | +14.8 |
| Conservative | Tania Mathias | 25,207 | 38.0 | −3.3 |
| Labour | Katherine Dunne | 6,114 | 9.2 | −2.3 |
| Majority | | 9,762 | 14.8 | |
| Turnout | | 66,290 | 79.5 | +2.2 |
| Liberal Democrats gain from Conservative | | Swing | +9.0 | |

== Liberal Democrats leadership elections ==
=== 2006 deputy leadership election ===
First round
| Candidate | Votes | % |
|---|---|---|
| Matthew Taylor | 25 | 39.7 |
| Vince Cable | 21 | 33.3 |
| David Heath | 17 | 27.0 |
| Turnout | 63 | 100% |

David Heath was eliminated after the first round, and his second preferences were redistributed.

Second round
| Candidate | Change | Votes | % |
|---|---|---|---|
| Vince Cable | +10 | 31 | 51.7 |
| Matthew Taylor | +4 | 29 | 48.3 |
| Not transferable | +3 | 3 | — |
| Turnout | | 63 | 100% |

=== 2017 leadership election ===
| Candidate | Votes | % |
Turnout: n/a
| Vince Cable MP | unopposed | n/a |
| Total | n/a | |
