= List of electoral wards in North Yorkshire =

This is a list of electoral divisions and wards in the ceremonial county of North Yorkshire in Yorkshire and the Humber. All changes since the re-organisation of local government following the passing of the Local Government Act 1972 are shown. The number of councillors elected for each electoral division or ward is shown in brackets.

== Unitary authority councils ==
=== Middlesbrough ===
Wards from 1 April 1974 (first election 7 June 1973) to 3 May 1979:

Wards from 3 May 1979 to 1 May 2003:

Wards from 1 May 2003 to 7 May 2015:

1. Acklam (2)
2. Ayresome (2)
3. Beckfield (2)
4. Beechwood (2)
5. Brookfield (2)
6. Clairville (2)
7. Coulby Newham (3)
8. Gresham (3)
9. Hemlington (2)
10. Kader (2)
11. Ladgate (2)
12. Linthorpe (3)
13. Marton (2)
14. Marton West (2)
15. Middlehaven (2)
16. North Ormesby & Brambles Farm (2)
17. Nunthorpe (2)
18. Pallister (2)
19. Park (2)
20. Park End (2)
21. Stainton & Thornton (1)
22. Thorntree (2)
23. University (2)

Wards from 7 May 2015 to present:

1. Acklam (2)
2. Ayresome (2)
3. Berwick Hills & Pallister (3)
4. Brambles & Thorntree (3)
5. Central (3)
6. Coulby Newham (3)
7. Hemlington (2)
8. Kader (2)
9. Ladgate (2)
10. Linthorpe (2)
11. Longlands & Beechwood (3)
12. Marton East (2)
13. Marton West (2)
14. Newport (3)
15. North Ormesby (1)
16. Nunthorpe (2)
17. Park (3)
18. Park End & Beckfield (3)
19. Stainton & Thornton (1)
20. Trimdon (2)

=== North Yorkshire ===
Electoral Divisions from 1 April 2023 (first election 5 May 2022):

1. Aire Valley (1)
2. Aiskew & Leeming (1)
3. Amotherby & Ampleforth (1)
4. Appleton Roebuck & Church Fenton (1)
5. Barlby & Riccall (1)
6. Bedale (1)
7. Bentham & Ingleton (1)
8. Bilton Grange & New Park (1)
9. Bilton & Nidd Gorge (1)
10. Boroughbridge & Claro (1)
11. Brayton & Barlow (1)
12. Camblesforth & Carlton (1)
13. Castle (1)
14. Catterick Village & Brompton-on-Swale (1)
15. Cawoood & Escrick (1)
16. Cayton (1)
17. Cliffe & North Duffield (1)
18. Coppice Valley & Duchy (1)
19. Danby & Mulgrave (1)
20. Derwent Valley & Moor (1)
21. Easingwold (1)
22. Eastfield (1)
23. Esk Valley & Coast (1)
24. Fairfax & Starbeck (1)
25. Falsgrave & Stepney (1)
26. Filey (1)
27. Great Ayton (1)
28. Glusburn, Cross Hills & Sutton-in-Craven (1)
29. Harlow & St Georges (1)
30. High Harrogate & Kingsley (1)
31. Hipswell & Colburn (1)
32. Helmsley & Sinnington (1)
33. Hillside & Raskelf (1)
34. Huby & Tollerton (1)
35. Hunmanby & Sherburn (1)
36. Hutton Rudby & Osmotherley (1)
37. Killinghall, Hampsthwaite & Saltergate (1)
38. Kirkbymoorside & Dales (1)
39. Knaresborough East (1)
40. Knaresborough West (1)
41. Leyburn & Middleham (1)
42. Malton (1)
43. Masham & Fountains (1)
44. Mid Craven (1)
45. Monk Fryston & South Milford (1)
46. Morton-on-Swale & Appleton Wiske (1)
47. Newby (1)
48. North Richmondshire (1)
49. Northallerton North & Brompton (1)
50. Northallerton South (1)
51. Norton (1)
52. Northstead (1)
53. Oatlands & Pannal (1)
54. Osgoldcross (1)
55. Ouseburn (1)
56. Pateley Bridge & Nidderdale (1)
57. Pickering (1)
58. Richmond (1)
59. Ripon Minster & Moorside (1)
60. Ripon Ure Bank & Spa (1)
61. Romanby (1)
62. Scalby & the Coast (1)
63. Scotton & Lower Wensleydale (1)
64. Seamer (1)
65. Selby East (1)
66. Selby West (2)
67. Settle & Penyghent (1)
68. Sherburn in Elmet (1)
69. Sheriff Hutton & Derwent (1)
70. Skipton East & South (1)
71. Skipton North & Embsay-with-Eastby (1)
72. Skipton West & West Craven (1)
73. Sowerby & Topcliffe (1)
74. Spofforth with Lower (1)
75. Wharfedale & Tockwith (1)
76. Stray, Woodlands & Hookstone (1)
77. Stokesley (1)
78. Tadcaster (1)
79. Thirsk (1)
80. Thorpe Willoughby & Hambleton (1)
81. Upper Dales (1)
82. Valley Gardens & Central Harrogate (1)
83. Washburn & Birstwith (1)
84. Wathvale & Bishop Monkton (1)
85. Weaponness & Ramshill (1)
86. Wharfedale (1)
87. Whitby Streonshalh (1)
88. Whitby West (1)
89. Woodlands (1)

=== Redcar and Cleveland ===
Wards from 1 April 1974 (first election 7 June 1973) to 6 May 1976:

Wards from 6 May 1976 to 2 May 1991:

Wards from 2 May 1991 to 1 May 2003:

1. Belmont (3)
2. Brotton (2)
3. Coatham (2)
4. Dormanstown (3)
5. Eston (3)
6. Grangetown (3)
7. Guisborough (3)
8. Hutton (2)
9. Kirkleatham (3)
10. Lockwood & Skinningrove (2)
11. Loftus (3)
12. Longbeck (3)
13. Newcomen (2)
14. Normanby (3)
15. Ormesby (3)
16. Redcar (2)
17. St Germain's (2)
18. Saltburn (3)
19. Skelton (3)
20. South Bank (3)
21. Teesville (3)
22. West Dyke (3)

Wards from 1 May 2003 to 2 May 2019:

1. Brotton (3)
2. Coatham (2)
3. Dormanstown (3)
4. Eston (3)
5. Grangetown (2)
6. Guisborough (3)
7. Hutton (3)
8. Kirkleatham (3)
9. Lockwood (1)
10. Loftus (3)
11. Longbeck (3)
12. Newcomen (2)
13. Normanby (3)
14. Ormesby (3)
15. St Germain's (3)
16. Saltburn (3)
17. Skelton (3)
18. South Bank (3)
19. Teesville (3)
20. West Dyke (3)
21. Westworth (2)
22. Zetland (2)

Wards from 2 May 2019 to present:

1. Belmont (2)
2. Brotton (3)
3. Coatham (2)
4. Dormanstown (2)
5. Eston (3)
6. Grangetown (2)
7. Guisborough (3)
8. Hutton (3)
9. Kirkleatham (3)
10. Lockwood (1)
11. Loftus (3)
12. Longbeck (2)
13. Newcomen (2)
14. Normanby (3)
15. Ormesby (3)
16. Saltburn (3)
17. Skelton East (2)
18. Skelton West (2)
19. South Bank (2)
20. St Germain's (3)
21. Teesville (3)
22. West Dyke (3)
23. Wheatlands (2)
24. Zetland (2)

=== Stockton-on-Tees ===
See: List of electoral wards in County Durham#Stockton-on-Tees

=== York ===
Wards from 1 April 1974 (first election 7 June 1973) to 3 May 1979:

Wards from 3 May 1979 to 4 May 1995:

Wards from 4 May 1995 to 1 May 2003:

1. Acomb (2)
2. Beckfield (2)
3. Bishophill (2)
4. Bootham (2)
5. Clifton (2)
6. Clifton Without (1)
7. Copmanthorpe (2)
8. Dunnington & Kexby (1)
9. Fishergate (2)
10. Foxwood (3)
11. Fulford (1)
12. Guildhall (2)
13. Haxby (3)
14. Heslington (1)
15. Heworth (2)
16. Heworth Without (1)
17. Holgate (2)
18. Huntington & New Earswick (3)
19. Knavesmire (2)
20. Micklegate (2)
21. Monk (2)
22. Osbaldwick (1)
23. Rawcliffe & Skelton (2)
24. Strensall (2)
25. Upper Poppleton (2)
26. Walmgate (2)
27. Westfield (2)
28. Wheldrake (1)
29. Wigginton (1)

Wards from 1 May 2003 to 7 May 2015:

1. Acomb (2)
2. Bishopthorpe (1)
3. Clifton (3)
4. Derwent (1)
5. Dringhouses & Woodthorpe (3)
6. Fishergate (2)
7. Fulford (1)
8. Guildhall (2)
9. Haxby & Wigginton (3)
10. Heslington (1)
11. Heworth (3)
12. Heworth Without (1)
13. Holgate (3)
14. Hull Road (2)
15. Huntington & New Earswick (3)
16. Micklegate (3)
17. Osbaldwick (1)
18. Rural West York (3)
19. Skelton, Rawcliffe & Clifton Without (3)
20. Strensall (2)
21. Westfield (3)
22. Wheldrake (1)

Wards from 7 May 2015 to present:

1. Acomb (2)
2. Bishopthorpe (1)
3. Clifton (2)
4. Copmanthorpe (1)
5. Dringhouses & Woodthorpe (3)
6. Fishergate (2)
7. Fulford & Heslington (1)
8. Guildhall (3)
9. Haxby & Wigginton (3)
10. Heworth (3)
11. Heworth Without (1)
12. Holgate (3)
13. Hull Road (3)
14. Huntington & New Earswick (3)
15. Micklegate (3)
16. Osbaldwick & Derwent (2)
17. Rawcliffe & Clifton Without (3)
18. Rural West York (2)
19. Strensall (2)
20. Westfield (3)
21. Wheldrake (1)

== Former county councils ==
=== Cleveland ===
Electoral Divisions from 1 April 1974 (first election 12 April 1973) to 2 May 1985:

1. Acklam (3)
2. Ayresome (2)
3. Berwick Hills (3)
4. Billingham East (3)
5. Billingham West (3)
6. Brinkburn (1)
7. Brus (1)
8. Coatham (2)
9. Dyke House (1)
10. Eston Grange (3)
11. Fens (1)
12. Grange (1)
13. Grangefield (2)
14. Gresham (2)
15. Guisborough East (1)
16. Guisborough West (1)
17. Hart (1)
18. Hartburn (3)
19. Jackson (1)
20. Kirkleatham (2)
21. Linthorpe (3)
22. Loftus (1)
23. Marske (2)
24. Marton & Nunthorpe (2)
25. Mile House (3)
26. North End (2)
27. North Ormesby (2)
28. Norton (2)
29. Ormesby (3)
30. Owton (1)
31. Park (1)
32. Redcar (2)
33. Rift House (1)
34. Rossmere (1)
35. Saltburn (1)
36. Seaton (1)
37. Skelton & Brotton No. 1 (1)
38. Skelton & Brotton No. 2 (1)
39. South Bank (3)
40. St Hilda (1)
41. St Hildas (2)
42. Stockton Rural No. 1 (1)
43. Stockton Rural No. 2 (1)
44. Stockton South (2)
45. Stokesley (1)
46. Stranton (1)
47. Thornaby East (2)
48. Thornaby West (2)
49. Thorntree (2)
50. Throston (1)
51. Tollesby (3)

Electoral Divisions from 2 May 1985 to 1 April 1996 (county abolished):

1. Ayresome (1)
2. Belle Vue (1)
3. Berwick Hills (1)
4. Bishopsgarth (1)
5. Blue Hall (1)
6. Boundary (1)
7. Brierton (1)
8. Britannia (1)
9. Brookfield (1)
10. Brotton & Skinningthorpe (1)
11. Brus (1)
12. Burn (1)
13. Cambridge Road (1)
14. Cargo Fleet (1)
15. Catcote (1)
16. Charltons (1)
17. College Road (1)
18. Coulby Newham (1)
19. Dormanstown (1)
20. Dyke House (1)
21. Egglescliffe (1)
22. Eston (1)
23. Fairfield (1)
24. Foggy Furze (1)
25. Glebe (1)
26. Golden Flatts (1)
27. Grangefield (1)
28. Grangetown (1)
29. Gresham (1)
30. Guisborough (1)
31. Hardwick (1)
32. Hartburn (1)
33. Ingleby Barwick (1)
34. Jackson (1)
35. Kader (1)
36. Kirkleatham (1)
37. Lingdale (1)
38. Loftus (1)
39. Longbeck (1)
40. Low Grange (1)
41. Mandale (1)
42. Marsh House (1)
43. Marton Grove (1)
44. Middlesbrough Park (1)
45. Mile House (1)
46. Mill Hill (1)
47. Mowbray (1)
48. Netherby (1)
49. Newcomen (1)
50. Newham Grange (1)
51. Newton under Roseberry (1)
52. Normanby (1)
53. Norton (1)
54. Ormesby (1)
55. Park End (1)
56. Parkfield (1)
57. Preston Whitton & Wolviston (1)
58. Roworth (1)
59. Rye Hill (1)
60. Saltburn (1)
61. Sandy Lane (1)
62. Skelton (1)
63. South Bank (1)
64. St Anns (1)
65. St Cuthberts (1)
66. St Germains (1)
67. St Hildas (1)
68. Stadium (1)
69. Stewart Park (1)
70. Teesville (1)
71. Throston (1)
72. Tollesby (1)
73. Victoria (1)
74. Village (1)
75. West Dyke (1)
76. Yarm (1)
77. Zetland Park (1)

=== North Yorkshire ===
Electoral Divisions from 1 April 1974 (first election 12 April 1973) to 2 May 1985:

1. Acomb (1)
2. Aysgarth (1)
3. Beckfield (1)
4. Bedale (1)
5. Bootham (1)
6. Brompton (1)
7. Clifton (1)
8. Derwent No. 1 (1)
9. Derwent No. 2 (1)
10. Easingwold (1)
11. Filey (1)
12. Fishergate (1)
13. Flaxton No. 1 (1)
14. Flaxton No. 2 (1)
15. Flaxton No. 3 (1)
16. Flaxton No. 4 (1)
17. Guildhall (1)
18. Harrogate (Bilton) (1)
19. Harrogate (Duchy) (1)
20. Harrogate (East Central) (1)
21. Harrogate (Granby) (1)
22. Harrogate (Harlow) (1)
23. Harrogate (Pannal) (1)
24. Harrogate (Starbeck) (1)
25. Harrogate (Wedderburn) (1)
26. Harrogate (West Central) (1)
27. Hemsley (1)
28. Heworth (1)
29. Holgate (2)
30. Kirkbymoorside (1)
31. Knaresborough (2)
32. Knavesmire (1)
33. Leyburn (1)
34. Malton (1)
35. Micklegate (2)
36. Monk (1)
37. Nidderdale No. 1 (1)
38. Nidderdale No. 2 (1)
39. Nidderdale No. 3 (1)
40. Northallerton (1)
41. Norton (1)
42. Norton Rural (1)
43. Osgoldcross (1)
44. Osmotherley (1)
45. Pickering (1)
46. Pickering Rural (1)
47. Reeth (1)
48. Richmond (1)
49. Richmond Rural No. 1 (1)
50. Richmond Rural No. 2 (1)
51. Ripon & Pateley Bridge No. 1 (1)
52. Ripon & Pateley Bridge No. 2 (1)
53. Ripon East (1)
54. Ripon West (1)
55. Scalby (1)
56. Scarborough (Castle) (1)
57. Scarborough (Eastfield) (1)
58. Scarborough (Falsgrave) (2)
59. Scarborough (Northstead) (1)
60. Scarborough (Weaponess) (1)
61. Scarborough (Woodlands) (1)
62. Scarborough Rural No. 1 (1)
63. Scarborough Rural No. 2 (1)
64. Selby No. 1 (1)
65. Selby No. 2 (1)
66. Selby Rural (1)
67. Settle No. 1 (1)
68. Settle No. 2 (1)
69. Sheriff Hutton (1)
70. Skipton No. 1 (1)
71. Skipton No. 2 (1)
72. Skipton Rural No. 1 (1)
73. Skipton Rural No. 2 (1)
74. Skipton Rural No. 3 (1)
75. Stillington (1)
76. Stokesley No. 1 (1)
77. Stokesley No. 2 (1)
78. Tadcaster No. 1 (1)
79. Tadcaster No. 2 (1)
80. Tadcaster No. 3 (1)
81. Thirsk No. 1 (1)
82. Thirsk No. 2 (1)
83. Walmgate (1)
84. Westfield (1)
85. Wetherby (1)
86. Whitby No. 1 (1)
87. Whitby No. 2 (1)
88. Whitby Rural No. 1 (1)
89. Whitby Rural No. 2 (1)

Electoral Divisions from 2 May 1985 to 5 May 2005:

1. Acomb (1); electoral division abolished in 1996
2. Airedale (1)
3. Appleton Wiske (1)
4. Beckfield (1); electoral division abolished in 1996
5. Bedale (1)
6. Bilton (1)
7. Bishophill (1); electoral division abolished in 1996
8. Bishopthorpe/Copmanthorpe (1); electoral division abolished in 1996
9. Bootham (1); electoral division abolished in 1996
10. Boroughbridge (1)
11. Brayton (1)
12. Castle (1)
13. Catterick (1)
14. Cawood (1)
15. Cayton (1)
16. Claro (1)
17. Clifton (1); electoral division abolished in 1996
18. Danby (1)
19. Derwent (1)
20. Duchy (1)
21. Dunnington (1); electoral division abolished in 1996
22. Easingwold (1)
23. East Central (1)
24. Eastfield (1)
25. Eskdale (1)
26. Falsgrave (1)
27. Filey (1)
28. Fishergate (1); electoral division abolished in 1996
29. Foxwood (1); electoral division abolished in 1996
30. Fulford (1)
31. Granby (1)
32. Great Ayton (1)
33. Guildhall (1); electoral division abolished in 1996
34. Harlow (1)
35. Haverah (1)
36. Haxby/Strensall (1); electoral division abolished in 1996
37. Haxby/Wigginton (1); electoral division abolished in 1996
38. Heworth (1); electoral division abolished in 1996
39. Holgate (1); electoral division abolished in 1996
40. Hovingham/Sheriff Hutton (1)
41. Huntington North (1)
42. Huntington South (1); electoral division abolished in 1996
43. Killinghall & New Park (1)
44. Kirkbymoorside (1)
45. Knaresborough East (1)
46. Knaresborough West (1)
47. Knavesmire (1); electoral division abolished in 1996
48. Lindhead (1)
49. Malton (1)
50. Masham & Fountains (1)
51. Mayfield (1)
52. Micklegate (1); electoral division abolished in 1996
53. Mid-Craven (1)
54. Middle Dales (1)
55. Monk (1); electoral division abolished in 1996
56. North Craven (1)
57. Northallerton East & Brompton (1)
58. Northallerton West (1)
59. Northstead (1)
60. Norton (1)
61. Osbaldwick/Heworth (1); electoral division abolished in 1996
62. Osgoldcross (1)
63. Pannal (1)
64. Pateley Bridge (1)
65. Pickering (1)
66. Poppleton (1)
67. Rawcliffe (1); electoral division abolished in 1996
68. Ribblesdale (1)
69. Richmond (1)
70. Richmondshire North (1)
71. Rillington (1)
72. Ripon East (1)
73. Ripon West (1)
74. Scalby (1)
75. Seamer (1)
76. Selby North (1)
77. Selby Rural (1)
78. Sherburn (1)
79. Skipton East (1)
80. Skipton West (1)
81. South Craven (1)
82. Starbeck (1)
83. Stillington (1)
84. Stokesley (1)
85. Streonshalh (1)
86. Tadcaster East (1)
87. Tadcaster West (1)
88. Thirsk (1)
89. Thornton (1)
90. Upper Dales (1)
91. Walmgate (1); electoral division abolished in 1996
92. Weaponness (1)
93. Wedderburn (1)
94. West Central (1)
95. Westfield (1); electoral division abolished in 1996
96. Woodlands (1)

Electoral Divisions from 5 May 2005 to 5 May 2022:

1. Ainsty (1)
2. Airedale (1) †
3. Bedale (1)
4. Boroughbridge (1)
5. Castle (1)
6. Catterick Bridge (1)
7. Cawood & Saxton (1)
8. Central Richmondshire (1)
9. Easingwold (1)
10. Eastfield & Osgodby (1)
11. Escrick (1)
12. Esk Valley (1)
13. Falsgrave & Stepney (1)
14. Filey (1)
15. Great Ayton (1)
16. Harrogate Bilton & Nidd Gorge (2)
17. Harrogate Central (2)
18. Harrogate Harlow (1)
19. Harrogate Oatlands (1)
20. Harrogate Saltergate (1)
21. Harrogate Starbeck (1)
22. Hertford & Cayton (1)
23. Hovingham & Sheriff Hutton (1)
24. Kirkbymoorside (1)
25. Knaresborough (2)
26. Lower Nidderdale & Bishop Monkton (1)
27. Malton (1)
28. Masham & Fountains (1)
29. Mid Craven (1) †
30. Mid Selby (1)
31. Middle Dales (1)
32. Newby (1)
33. North Craven (1)
34. North Hambleton (1)
35. Northallerton (1)
36. Northstead (1)
37. Norton (1)
38. Osgoldcross (1)
39. Pannal & Lower Wharfedale (1)
40. Pateley Bridge (1)
41. Pickering (1)
42. Ribblesdale (1)
43. Richmond (1)
44. Richmondshire North (1)
45. Ripon North (1)
46. Ripon South (1)
47. Romanby & Broomfield (1)
48. Scalby & The Coast (1)
49. Seamer & Derwent Valley (1)
50. Selby Barlby (2)
51. Selby Brayton (1)
52. Sherburn in Elmet (1)
53. Skipton East (1) †
54. Skipton West (1) †
55. South Craven (1) †
56. South Selby (1)
57. Sowerby (1)
58. Stillington (1)
59. Stokesley (1)
60. Swale (1)
61. Tadcaster (1)
62. Thirsk (1)
63. Thornton Dale & the Wolds (1)
64. Upper Dales (1)
65. Weaponness & Ramshill (1)
66. Whitby/Mayfield cum Mulgrave (1)
67. Whitby/Streonshalh (1)
68. Woodlands (1)

† minor boundary changes in 2013

Electoral Divisions from 6 May 2022 to 31 March 2023 (county abolished):

The electoral divisions for the election held on 5 May 2022 were those determined for the unitary North Yorkshire Council, and were in effect until the county council was abolished.

== Former district councils ==
=== Craven ===
Wards from 1 April 1974 (first election 7 June 1973) to 3 May 1979:

Wards from 3 May 1979 to 2 May 2002:

Wards from 2 May 2002 to 1 April 2023:

1. Aire Valley with Lothersdale (2) †
2. Barden Fell (1) †
3. Bentham (2)
4. Cowling (1) †
5. Embsay-with-Eastby (1) †
6. Gargrave & Malhamdale (2) †
7. Glusburn (2) †
8. Grassington (1) †
9. Hellifield & Long Preston (1) †
10. Ingleton & Clapham (2)
11. Penyghent (1) †
12. Settle & Ribblebanks (2) †
13. Skipton East (2) †
14. Skipton North (2) †
15. Skipton South (2)
16. Skipton West (2) †
17. Sutton-in-Craven (2) †
18. Upper Wharfedale (1)
19. West Craven (1) †

† minor boundary changes in 2015

=== Hambleton ===
Wards from 1 April 1974 (first election 7 June 1973) to 3 May 1979:

Wards from 3 May 1979 to 1 May 2003:

Wards from 1 May 2003 to 7 May 2015:

1. Bedale (2)
2. Brompton (1)
3. Broughton & Greenhow (1)
4. Cowtons (1)
5. Crakehall (1)
6. Easingwold (2)
7. Great Ayton (3)
8. Helperby (1)
9. Huby & Sutton (1)
10. Leeming (1)
11. Leeming Bar (1)
12. Morton-on-Swale (1)
13. Northallerton Broomfield (2)
14. Northallerton Central (2)
15. Northallerton North (2)
16. Osmotherley (1)
17. Romanby (2)
18. Rudby (2)
19. Shipton (1)
20. Sowerby (2)
21. Stillington (1)
22. Stokesley (3)
23. Swainby (1)
24. Tanfield (1)
25. Thirsk (3)
26. Thorntons (1)
27. Tollerton (1)
28. Topcliffe (1)
29. White Horse (1)
30. Whitestonecliffe (1)

Wards from 7 May 2015 to 1 April 2023:

1. Appleton Wiske & Smeatons (1)
2. Bagby & Thorntons (1)
3. Bedale (3)
4. Easingwold (3)
5. Great Ayton (2)
6. Huby (1)
7. Hutton Rudby (1)
8. Morton-on-Swale (1)
9. Northallerton North & Brompton (2)
10. Northallerton South (2)
11. Osmotherley & Swainby (1)
12. Raskelf & White Horse (1)
13. Romanby (2)
14. Sowerby & Topcliffe (2)
15. Stokesley (2)
16. Tanfield (1)
17. Thirsk (2)

=== Harrogate ===
Wards from 1 April 1974 (first election 7 June 1973) to 5 May 1983:

Wards from 5 May 1983 to 2 May 2002:

Wards from 2 May 2002 to 3 May 2018:

1. Bilton (2)
2. Bishop Monkton (1)
3. Boroughbridge (1)
4. Claro (1)
5. Granby (2)
6. Harlow Moor (2)
7. High Harrogate (2)
8. Hookstone (2)
9. Killinghall (1)
10. Kirkby Malzeard (1)
11. Knaresborough East (2)
12. Knaresborough King James (2)
13. Knaresborough Scriven Park (2)
14. Lower Nidderdale (1)
15. Low Harrogate (2)
16. Marston Moor (1)
17. Mashamshire (1)
18. Newby (1)
19. New Park (2)
20. Nidd Valley (1)
21. Ouseburn (1)
22. Pannal (2)
23. Pateley Bridge (1)
24. Ribston (1)
25. Ripon Minster (2)
26. Ripon Moorside (2)
27. Ripon Spa (2)
28. Rossett (2)
29. Saltergate (2)
30. Spofforth with Lower Wharfedale (1)
31. Starbeck (2)
32. Stray (2)
33. Washburn (1)
34. Wathvale (1)
35. Woodfield (2)

Wards from 3 May 2018 to 1 April 2023:

1. Bishop Monkton & Newby (1)
2. Boroughbridge (1)
3. Claro (1)
4. Fountains & Ripley (1)
5. Harrogate Bilton Grange (1)
6. Harrogate Bilton Woodfield (1)
7. Harrogate Central (1)
8. Harrogate Coppice Valley (1)
9. Harrogate Duchy (1)
10. Harrogate Fairfax (1)
11. Harrogate Harlow (1)
12. Harrogate High Harrogate (1)
13. Harrogate Hookstone (1)
14. Harrogate Kingsley (1)
15. Harrogate New Park (1)
16. Harrogate Oaklands (1)
17. Harrogate Old Bilton (1)
18. Harrogate Pannal (1)
19. Harrogate Saltergate (1)
20. Harrogate St Georges (1)
21. Harrogate Starbeck (1)
22. Harrogate Stray (1)
23. Harrogate Valley Gardens (1)
24. Killinghall & Hampsthwaite (1)
25. Knaresborough Aspin & Calcutt (1)
26. Knaresborough Castke (1)
27. Knaresborough Eastfield (1)
28. Knaresborough Scriven Park (1)
29. Marston Moor (1)
30. Masham & Kirkby Malzeard (1)
31. Nidd Valley (1)
32. Ouseburn (1)
33. Pateley Bridge & Nidderdale Moors (1)
34. Ripon Minster (1)
35. Ripon Moorside (1)
36. Ripon Spa (1)
37. Ripon Ure Bank (1)
38. Spofforth with Lower Wharfedale (1)
39. Washburn (1)
40. Wathvale (1)

=== Richmondshire ===
Wards from 1 April 1974 (first election 7 June 1973) to 3 May 1979:

Wards from 3 May 1979 to 1 May 2003:

Wards from 1 May 2003 to 2 May 2019:

1. Addlebrough (1)
2. Barton (1)
3. Bolton Castle (1)
4. Brompton-on-Swale & Scorton (2)
5. Catterick (2)
6. Colburn (3)
7. Croft (1)
8. Gilling West (1)
9. Hawes & High Abbotside (1)
10. Hipswell (2)
11. Hornby Castle (1)
12. Leyburn (2)
13. Lower Wensleydale (1)
14. Melsonby (1)
15. Middleham (1)
16. Middleton Tyas (1)
17. Newsham with Eppleby (1)
18. Penhill (1)
19. Reeth & Arkengarthdale (1)
20. Richmond Central (2)
21. Richmond East (2)
22. Richmond West (2)
23. Scotton (2)
24. Swaledale (1)

Wards from 2 May 2019 to 1 April 2023:

1. Catterick & Brompton-on-Swale (3)
2. Colburn (2)
3. Croft & Middleton Tyas (2)
4. Gilling West (1)
5. Hawes, High Abbotside & Upper Swaledale (1)
6. Hipswell (2)
7. Leyburn (2)
8. Lower Swaledale & Arkengarthdale (1)
9. Lower Wensleydale (1)
10. Melsonby (1)
11. Middleham (1)
12. Richmond East (1)
13. Richmond North (1)
14. Richmond West (2)
15. Scotton (2)
16. Yoredale (1)

=== Ryedale ===
Wards from 1 April 1974 (first election 7 June 1973) to 5 May 1983:

Wards from 5 May 1983 to 1 May 2003:

Wards from 1 May 2003 to 1 April 2023:

1. Amotherby (1)
2. Ampleforth (1)
3. Cropton (1)
4. Dales (1)
5. Derwent (2)
6. Helmsley (2)
7. Hovingham (1)
8. Kirkbymoorside (2)
9. Malton (3)
10. Norton East (2)
11. Norton West (2)
12. Pickering East (2)
13. Pickering West (2)
14. Rillington (1)
15. Ryedale South West (1)
16. Sherburn (1)
17. Sheriff Hutton (1)
18. Sinnington (1)
19. Thornton Dale (2)
20. Wolds (1)

=== Scarborough ===
Wards from 1 April 1974 (first election 7 June 1973) to 3 May 1979:

Wards from 3 May 1979 to 1 May 2003:

Wards from 1 May 2003 to 2 May 2019:

1. Castle (2)
2. Cayton (2)
3. Central (2)
4. Danby (1)
5. Derwent Valley (2)
6. Eastfield (3)
7. Esk Valley (2)
8. Falsgrave Park (2)
9. Filey (3)
10. Fylingdales (1)
11. Hertford (2)
12. Lindhead (1)
13. Mayfield (2)
14. Mulgrave (2)
15. Newby (3)
16. North Bay (2)
17. Northstead (2)
18. Ramshill (2)
19. Scalby, Hackness & Staintondale (2)
20. Seamer (2)
21. Stepney (2)
22. Streonshalh (2)
23. Weaponness (2)
24. Whitby West Cliff (2)
25. Woodlands (2)

Wards from 2 May 2019 to 1 April 2023:

1. Burniston & Cloughton (1)
2. Castle (3)
3. Cayton (2)
4. Danby & Mulgrave (2)
5. Derwent Valley & Moor (2)
6. Eastfield (3)
7. Esk Valley (2)
8. Falsgrave & Stepney (3)
9. Filey (3)
10. Fylingdales & Ravenscar (1)
11. Hunmanby (2)
12. Mayfield (2)
13. Newby (3)
14. Northstead (3)
15. Scalby (2)
16. Seamer (2)
17. Streonshalh (2)
18. Weaponness & Ramshill (3)
19. Whitby West Cliff (2)
20. Woodlands (3)

=== Selby ===
Wards from 1 April 1974 (first election 7 June 1973) to 3 May 1979:

Wards from 3 May 1979 to 1 May 2003:

Wards from 1 May 2003 to 7 May 2015:

1. Appleton Roebuck (1)
2. Barlby (2)
3. Brayton (3)
4. Camblesforth (2)
5. Cawood with Wistow (2)
6. Eggborough (2)
7. Fairburn with Brotherton (2)
8. Hambleton (3)
9. Hemingbrough (2)
10. Monk Fryston & South Milford (2)
11. North Duffield (1)
12. Riccall with Escrick (2)
13. Saxton & Ulleskelf (1)
14. Selby North (3)
15. Selby South (2)
16. Selby West (2)
17. Sherburn in Elmet (3)
18. Tadcaster East (2)
19. Tadcaster West (2)
20. Whitley (2)

Wards from 7 May 2015 to 1 April 2023:

1. Appleton Roebuck & Church Fenton (2)
2. Barlby Village (1)
3. Brayton (2)
4. Byram & Brotherton (1)
5. Camblesforth & Carlton (2)
6. Cawood & Wistow (1)
7. Derwent (2)
8. Eggborough (1)
9. Escrick (1)
10. Hambleton (1)
11. Monk Fryston (1)
12. Riccall (1)
13. Selby East (3)
14. Selby West (3)
15. Sherburn in Elmet (3)
16. South Milford (1)
17. Tadcaster (3)
18. Thorpe Willoughby (1)
19. Whitley (1)

== Electoral wards by constituency ==
Wards as they existed on 1 December 2020.

=== Harrogate and Knaresborough ===
Harrogate: Claro; Harrogate Bilton Grange; Harrogate Bilton Woodfield; Harrogate Central; Harrogate Coppice Valley; Harrogate Duchy; Harrogate Fairfax; Harrogate Harlow; Harrogate High Harrogate; Harrogate Hookstone; Harrogate Kingsley; Harrogate New Park; Harrogate Oatlands; Harrogate Old Bilton; Harrogate Pannal; Harrogate St. Georges; Harrogate Saltergate; Harrogate Starbeck; Harrogate Stray; Harrogate Valley Gardens; Killinghall & Hampsthwaite; Knaresborough Aspin & Calcutt; Knaresborough Castle; Knaresborough Eastfield; Knaresborough Scriven Park.

=== Middlesbrough and Thornaby East ===
Middlesbrough: Acklam; Ayresome; Berwick Hills & Pallister; Brambles & Thorntree; Central; Kader; Linthorpe; Longlands & Beechwood; Newport; North Ormesby; Park; Trimdon.

Stockton-on-Tees: Mandale & Victoria; Stainsby Hill.

=== Middlesbrough South and East Cleveland ===
Middlesbrough: Coulby Newham; Hemlington; Ladgate; Marton East; Marton West; Nunthorpe; Park End & Beckfield; Stainton & Thornton.

Redcar and Cleveland: Belmont; Brotton; Guisborough; Hutton; Lockwood; Loftus; Skelton East; Skelton West.

=== Redcar ===
Redcar and Cleveland: Coatham; Dormanstown; Eston; Grangetown; Kirkleatham; Longbeck; Newcomen; Normanby; Ormesby; St. Germain’s; Saltburn; South Bank; Teesville; West Dyke; Wheatlands; Zetland.

=== Richmond and Northallerton ===
Hambleton: Appleton Wiske & Smeatons; Great Ayton; Hutton Rudby; Morton-on-Swale; Northallerton North & Brompton; Northallerton South; Osmotherley & Swainby; Romanby; Stokesley.

Richmondshire: Catterick & Brompton-on-Swale; Colburn; Croft & Middleton Tyas; Gilling West; Hawes, High Abbotside & Upper Swaledale; Hipswell; Leyburn; Lower Swaledale & Arkengarthdale; Lower Wensleydale; Melsonby; Middleham; Richmond East; Richmond North; Richmond West; Scotton; Yoredale.

=== Scarborough and Whitby ===
Scarborough: Burniston & Cloughton; Castle; Cayton; Danby & Mulgrave; Derwent Valley & Moor; Eastfield; Esk Valley; Falsgrave & Stepney; Fylingdales & Ravenscar; Mayfield; Newby; Northstead; Scalby; Seamer; Streonshalh; Weaponness & Ramshill; Whitby West Cliff; Woodlands.

=== Selby (part) ===
Selby: Barlby Village; Brayton; Byram & Brotherton; Camblesforth & Carlton; Cawood & Wistow; Derwent; Eggborough; Escrick; Hambleton; Monk Fryston; Riccall; Selby East; Selby West; Sherburn in Elmet; South Milford; Thorpe Willoughby; Whitley.

=== Skipton and Ripon ===
Craven: Aire Valley with Lothersdale; Barden Fell; Bentham; Cowling; Embsay-with-Eastby; Gargrave & Malhamdale; Glusburn; Grassington; Hellifield & Long Preston; Ingleton & Clapham; Penyghent; Settle & Ribblebanks; Skipton East; Skipton North; Skipton South; Skipton West; Sutton-in-Craven; Upper Wharfedale; West Craven.

Harrogate: Fountains & Ripley; Masham & Kirkby Malzeard; Nidd Valley; Pateley Bridge & Nidderdale Moors; Ripon Minster; Ripon Moorside; Ripon Spa; Ripon Ure Bank; Washburn; Wathvale.

=== Stockton West (part) ===
Stockton-on-Tees: Ingleby Barwick East; Ingleby Barwick West; Village; Yarm.

=== Thirsk and Malton ===
Hambleton: Bagby & Thorntons; Bedale; Sowerby & Topcliffe; Tanfield; Thirsk.

Ryedale: Amotherby; Ampleforth; Cropton; Dales; Derwent; Helmsley; Hovingham; Kirkbymoorside; Malton; Norton East; Norton West; Pickering East; Pickering West; Rillington; Ryedale South West; Sherburn; Sheriff Hutton; Sinnington; Thornton Dale; Wolds.

Scarborough: Filey; Hunmanby.

=== Wetherby and Easingwold (part) ===
Hambleton: Easingwold; Huby; Raskelf & White Horse.

Harrogate: Bishop Monkton & Newby; Boroughbridge; Marston Moor; Ouseburn; Spofforth with Lower Wharfedale.

Selby: Appleton Roebuck & Church Fenton; Tadcaster.

=== York Central ===
York: Acomb; Clifton; Fishergate; Guildhall; Heworth; Holgate; Hull Road; Micklegate; Westfield.

=== York Outer ===
York: Bishopthorpe; Copmanthorpe; Dringhouses & Woodthorpe; Fulford & Heslington; Haxby & Wigginton; Heworth Without; Huntington & New Earswick; Osbaldwick & Derwent; Rawcliffe & Clifton Without; Rural West York; Strensall; Wheldrake.

== See also ==
- List of parliamentary constituencies in North Yorkshire
