= Charles Longbottom =

British barrister, businessman and politician

Charles Longbottom OBE

Member of Parliament for York
- In office 8 October 1959 – 10 March 1966
- Preceded by: Harry Hylton-Foster
- Succeeded by: Alex Lyon

Personal details
- Born: Charles Brooke Longbottom; 22 July 1930
- Died: 5 February 2013 (aged 82) Brompton or Belmont, London, England
- Party: Conservative
- Education: Uppingham School
- Occupation: Barrister; businessman; MP
- Awards: Officer of the Order of the British Empire (2012)

Charles Brooke Longbottom OBE (22 July 1930 – 5 February 2013) was a British barrister, businessman and Conservative politician. In his later years his interest turned to Christian healing and education.

He was appointed Officer of the Order of the British Empire (OBE) in the 2012 New Year Honours for public and charitable services.

== Early career ==
Longbottom was educated at Uppingham School, and then read for the Bar, being called in 1958 by the Inner Temple. He was interested in politics from an early age and was Vice Chairman of the Young Conservatives Advisory Committee in 1953–54; while a student he was part of the United Kingdom delegation to the World Assembly of Youth Services in Genval, Belgium.

== Parliament ==
After fighting Stockton-on-Tees in the 1955 general election, Longbottom was selected for York and won the seat in the 1959 general election. Iain Macleod, the Leader of the House of Commons, picked him as his Parliamentary Private Secretary in 1961; he served until Macleod went out of office in 1963.

== Maritime business career ==
After losing his seat at the 1966 general election, Longbottom went into the shipbuilding business. He was chairman of Austin & Pickersgill shipbuilders (based in Sunderland) from 1966 to 1972, and of A&P Appledore International Ltd from 1970 to 1979. He joined Seascope in 1970 and was chairman of several subsidiary companies. In the 1980s his business career diversified into financial services and was a Director of Henry Ansbacher & Co from 1982 to 1987.

Although not attempting a return into politics, Longbottom was considered for public appointments. He had been made a member of the General Advisory Committee of the BBC in 1965 and served ten years, and was also a member of the Community Relations Commission from 1968 to 1970.

== Activities after retirement ==
Charles Longbottom served 16 years as a Director of British Shipbuilders, and as Chairman of MC Shipping Inc. from 2004 to 2010.

However his main interest lay in Christian healing and education. He was Chairman of Acorn Christian Healing Trust and the Acorn Christian Foundation from 1988 to 2001. He was Chairman of the Awareness Foundation from its founding in 2003 until the middle of 2012.

== Death ==
He became ill in the summer of 2012 and died at the Royal Marsden Hospital on 5 February 2013 at the age of 82.

== Footnotes ==
Parliament of the United Kingdom
Preceded by Sir Harry Hylton-Foster	Member of Parliament for York; 1959–1966	Succeeded by Alex Lyon
