= 2006 Lewisham London Borough Council election =

English local authority election

2006 Lewisham Council election
- 4 May 2006

All 54 council seats to Lewisham London Borough Council 28 seats needed for a majority
	First party	Second party	Third party
Party	Labour	Liberal Democrats	Green
Seats won	26	17	6
Seat change	▼19	▲13	▲5
Popular vote	17,869	13,367	10,443
Percentage	32.7%	24.4%	19.1%
Swing	▼6.3%	▲5.8%	▲3.0%
	Fourth party	Fifth party
Party	Conservative	Socialist
Seats won	3	2
Seat change	▲1	▲1
Popular vote	9,894	1,118
Percentage	18.1%	2.0%
Swing	▲1.7%	▲0.1%
- Map of the results of the 2006 Lewisham council election. Conservatives in blue, Greens in green, Labour in red, Liberal Democrats in yellow and Socialist Alternative in light red.
Council control before election
Labour
Council control after election
No overall control

Elections to Lewisham London Borough Council were held on 4 May 2006. The whole council was up for election for the first time since the 2002 election.

Lewisham local elections are held every four years, with the next due in 2010.

== Election result ==
Lewisham local election result 2006
Party	Seats	Gains	Losses	Net gain/loss	Seats %	Votes %	Votes	+/−
Labour	26	0	19	▼19	48.1	32.7	17,869	▼6.3
Liberal Democrats	17	13	0	▲13	31.5	24.4	13,367	▲5.8
Green	6	5	0	▲5	11.1	19.1	10,443	▲3.0
Conservative	3	1	0	▲1	5.6	18.1	9,894	▲1.7
Socialist	2	1	0	▲1	3.7	2.0	1,118	▲0.1
Independent	0	0	0	Steady	0.0	2.7	1,459	▲1.1
UKIP	0	0	0	Steady	0.0	0.5	281	▼0.1
Lewisham Peoples Alliance	0	0	0	Steady	0.0	0.3	169	New
Alliance for Green Socialism	0	0	0	Steady	0.0	0.2	111	New

The Green Party won all three seats in the Brockley and Ladywell wards and the Socialist Alternative won two seats in the Telegraph Hill ward.

== Election for Mayor ==
Lewisham Mayoral Election Results 2006
Name	Party	1st Preference Votes	%	2nd Preference Votes¹	%	Final	%²
Steve Bullock	Labour	22,155	37.7	2,974	?	25,129	57.1
Christopher Maines	Liberal Democrats	12,398	21.1	6,491	?	18,889	42.9
James Cleverly	Conservative	10,790	18.4	?	?	N/A	
Michael Keogh	Green	7,168	12.2	?	?	N/A	
John Hamilton	Independent	4,823	8.2	?	?	N/A	
Sinna Mani	Lewisham Peoples Alliance	1,366	2.3	?	?	N/A	

¹Under the Supplementary Vote system, if no candidate receives 50% of 1st choice votes, 2nd choice votes are added to the result for the top two 1st choice candidates. If a ballot gives a first and second preference to the top two candidates in either order, then their second preference is not counted, so that a second preference cannot count against a first.

²Percentage figures are not officially used on the final votes, they are produced here for illustration and are calculated by the candidates final vote divided by the total of final votes.

== Ward results ==
=== Bellingham ===
Bellingham (3)
Party	Candidate	Votes	%	±%
Labour	Alan Hall	878	40.3	
Labour	Ami Ibitson	849		
Labour	Ronald Stockbridge	780		
Conservative	Douglas Pratt	498	22.8	
Conservative	Rosemary Pratt	461		
Liberal Democrats	Sarah Morris	455	20.9	
Liberal Democrats	Nicholas Ashton	448		
Conservative	Margaret Smith	438		
Liberal Democrats	Derek Gambell	383		
Green	Roger Sedgley	350	16.0	
Turnout			22.6	
Labour hold		Swing		
Labour hold		Swing		
Labour hold		Swing		

=== Blackheath ===
Blackheath (3)
Party	Candidate	Votes	%	±%
Liberal Democrats	Christopher Maines	1,088	35.1	
Liberal Democrats	Mark Bennett	1,018		
Liberal Democrats	Godfried Gyechie	931		
Labour	Andrew Brown	895	28.9	
Labour	Rachael Maskell	864		
Labour	Gavin Moore	860		
Conservative	Simon Nundy	667	21.5	
Conservative	Neil Weatherall	663		
Conservative	Darren Wall	654		
Green	Vanessa Gould	446	14.4	
Green	Rasjidah St John	343		
Green	Charles Acton	343		
Turnout			33.5	
Liberal Democrats gain from Labour		Swing		
Liberal Democrats gain from Labour		Swing		
Liberal Democrats gain from Labour		Swing		

=== Brockley ===
Brockley (3)
Party	Candidate	Votes	%	±%
Green	Darren Johnson	1,583	50.0	
Green	Romayne Phoenix	1,223		
Green	Dean Walton	1,153		
Labour	Obajimi Adefiranye	928	29.3	
Labour	Rosemary Fooks	907		
Labour	Terence Scott	870		
Liberal Democrats	Keith Adderley	300	9.5	
Liberal Democrats	Anne Timson	291		
Liberal Democrats	David Cloke	250		
Conservative	Carolyn Freeman	247	7.8	
Conservative	Darren Larking	240		
Conservative	Maureen Wayling	170		
Alliance for Green Socialism	Tobias Abse	111	3.5	
Turnout			28.5	
Green hold		Swing		
Green gain from Labour		Swing		
Green gain from Labour		Swing		

=== Catford South ===
Catford South (3)
Party	Candidate	Votes	%	±%
Labour	Robert Massey	1,270	37.2	
Labour	Alan Smith	1,135		
Labour	Eva Stamirowski	1,055		
Conservative	James Cleverly	985	28.9	
Conservative	Andrew Lee	808		
Conservative	Thomas Philpott	757		
Liberal Democrats	Nicholas Hill	645	18.9	
Liberal Democrats	Patrick McKee	543		
Green	Frances Brackley	513	15.0	
Liberal Democrats	Adrien Smith	422		
Turnout			31.3	
Labour hold		Swing		
Labour hold		Swing		
Labour hold		Swing		

=== Crofton Park ===
Crofton Park (3)
Party	Candidate	Votes	%	±%
Labour	Jacqueline Addison	1,163	37.8	
Labour	Sylvia Scott	898		
Labour	Jarman Parmar	836		
Green	Jeremy Hicks	700	22.7	
Green	Ulla Carlisle	690		
Green	James Wild	672		
Liberal Democrats	Stephen Locke	613	19.9	
Conservative	Philip Akroyd	604	19.6	
Conservative	Paul Oakley	564		
Liberal Democrats	David Morpurgo	557		
Liberal Democrats	Michael Garrard	500		
Conservative	Gemma Townsend	479		
Turnout			30.1	
Labour hold		Swing		
Labour hold		Swing		
Labour hold		Swing		

=== Downham ===
Downham (3)
Party	Candidate	Votes	%	±%
Liberal Democrats	Julia Fletcher	1,130	49.6	
Liberal Democrats	Mark Morris	1,117		
Liberal Democrats	Simon Carter	1,106		
Labour	Paul Jacob	590	25.9	
Labour	Roy Kennedy	586		
Labour	Paul Morris	554		
Conservative	Susannah Cleverly	403	17.7	
Conservative	Barbara Kennedy	330		
Conservative	James Cookson	326		
Green	Mark Cunningham	153	6.7	
Green	Lee Roach	149		
Green	Stephen Thomas	137		
Turnout			26.4	
Liberal Democrats hold		Swing		
Liberal Democrats hold		Swing		
Liberal Democrats gain from Labour		Swing		

=== Evelyn ===
Evelyn (3)
Party	Candidate	Votes	%	±%
Labour	Heidi Alexander	1,317	57.5	
Labour	Samuel Owolabi-Oluyole	1,073		
Labour	Crada Onuegbu	1,021		
Conservative	Rebecca Stevens	347	15.1	
Liberal Democrats	Richard Grainger	326	14.2	
Liberal Democrats	Corina Poore	304		
Green	Hanna Fiegenbaum	301	13.1	
Green	Julian Sanders	301		
Conservative	Lincoln Pedzeni	296		
Liberal Democrats	Charles Turner	278		
Conservative	Pauline Manangazira	263		
Green	Sydney Smith	261		
Turnout			24.1	
Labour hold		Swing		
Labour hold		Swing		
Labour hold		Swing		

=== Forest Hill ===
Forest Hill (3)
Party	Candidate	Votes	%	±%
Liberal Democrats	Alexander Feakes	1,439	39.7	
Liberal Democrats	Arthur Peake	1,434		
Liberal Democrats	John Russell	1,176		
Labour	Katherine Holtman	846	23.4	
Labour	David Whiting	754		
Labour	David Michael	719		
Green	Regina Purrmann	631	17.4	
Conservative	David Hart	536	14.8	
Conservative	Raymond Squires	436		
Conservative	Neil Tritschler	410		
Lewisham Peoples Alliance	Sinna Mani	169	4.7	
Turnout			32.9	
Liberal Democrats gain from Labour		Swing		
Liberal Democrats gain from Labour		Swing		
Liberal Democrats gain from Labour		Swing		

=== Grove Park ===
Grove Park (3)
Party	Candidate	Votes	%	±%
Conservative	Barrie Anderson	1,269	43.2	
Conservative	David Britton	1,130		
Conservative	Hilary Downes	1,017		
Labour	Mark Ingleby	892	30.4	
Labour	David Williams	771		
Labour	Eleanor Reeves	708		
Liberal Democrats	Ben Brooks	478	16.3	
Liberal Democrats	Brenda Pooley	378		
Liberal Democrats	Howard Robinson	340		
Green	John Green	299	10.2	
Green	Priscilla Cotterell	297		
Green	Christine Moores	287		
Turnout			28.4	
Conservative hold		Swing		
Conservative hold		Swing		
Conservative gain from Labour		Swing		

=== Ladywell ===
Ladywell (3)
Party	Candidate	Votes	%	±%
Green	Michael Keogh	1,497	45.4	
Green	Susan Luxton	1,428		
Green	Ute Michel	1,217		
Labour	Abdeslam Amrani	1,073	32.6	
Labour	Pauline Morrison	984		
Labour	Carl Handley	957		
Liberal Democrats	Christine Dinsmore	436	13.2	
Liberal Democrats	John Kellett	361		
Liberal Democrats	Samantha Lyster	346		
Conservative	David Furze	288	8.7	
Conservative	Rachael Maguire	288		
Conservative	Terence Reeves	224		
Turnout			35.4	
Green gain from Labour		Swing		
Green gain from Labour		Swing		
Green gain from Labour		Swing		

=== Lee Green ===
Lee Green (3)
Party	Candidate	Votes	%	±%
Liberal Democrats	Paul Bentley	1,208	29.8	
Liberal Democrats	Brian Robson	924		
Liberal Democrats	Sven Griesenbeck	898		
Labour	James Mallory	826	20.4	
Conservative	Christine Allison	818	20.2	
Labour	Nora Riordan	706		
Labour	Ashtaq Arain	701		
Conservative	Joanna Britton	697		
Independent	Gerard Ambrose	696	17.2	
Conservative	Brian Chipps	689		
Green	Anna Baker	506	12.5	
Green	Andrea Hughes	388		
Green	Gaynor Evans	375		
Turnout			35.8	
Liberal Democrats gain from Labour		Swing		
Liberal Democrats gain from Labour		Swing		
Liberal Democrats gain from Labour		Swing		

=== Lewisham Central ===
Lewisham Central (3)
Party	Candidate	Votes	%	±%
Liberal Democrats	Andrew Milton	1,340	41.0	
Liberal Democrats	David Edgerton	1,033		
Labour	Edward Mark	988	30.3	
Labour	Anthony Kendall	962		
Labour	James Stevenson	957		
Liberal Democrats	Akbar Aghamiri	949		
Green	Diana Birch	523	16.0	
Green	Andrew Smith	491		
Conservative	Maria McInnes	414	12.7	
Conservative	David Gold	391		
Green	Trottie Kirwan	387		
Conservative	Hans Hansen	363		
Turnout			31.2	
Liberal Democrats gain from Labour		Swing		
Liberal Democrats gain from Labour		Swing		
Labour hold		Swing		

=== New Cross ===
New Cross (3)
Party	Candidate	Votes	%	±%
Labour	Stephen Padmore	1,016	45.4	
Labour	Madeliene Long	941		
Labour	Paul Maslin	849		
Independent	Raymond Woolford	439	19.6	
Independent	Barbara Raymond	423		
Independent	Ann-Marie Powell	397		
Green	Sylvia Green	344	15.4	
Green	Deborah Stimson	253		
Green	Alexandra Rae	247		
Liberal Democrats	Heidi Degen	222	9.9	
Conservative	Darrien Pierce	219	9.8	
Liberal Democrats	Linda Hawkins	214		
Liberal Democrats	Julian Hawkins	205		
Conservative	Deborah Wellard	190		
Conservative	James Wright	178		
Turnout			23.0	
Labour hold		Swing		
Labour hold		Swing		
Labour hold		Swing		

=== Perry Vale ===
Perry Vale (3)
Party	Candidate	Votes	%	±%
Labour	John Paschoud	1,078	31.4	
Labour	Susan Wise	1,064		
Labour	Alan Till	1,061		
Liberal Democrats	Henrietta Barnes	933	27.2	
Green	Jill Rutter	784	22.9	
Liberal Democrats	Jane Russell	783		
Liberal Democrats	Andrew Redfern	656		
Conservative	Mark Burstow	634	18.5	
Conservative	Roger Pawley	538		
Conservative	Gwynfor Tippett	503		
Turnout			29.9	
Labour hold		Swing		
Labour hold		Swing		
Labour hold		Swing		

=== Rushey Green ===
Rushey Green (3)
Party	Candidate	Votes	%	±%
Labour	Helen Klier	990	37.1	
Labour	Peggy Fitzsimons	975		
Labour	John Muldoon	845		
Liberal Democrats	Valerie Cox	537	20.1	
Green	Andrew Winter	480	18.0	
Liberal Democrats	Michael Abrahams	445		
Liberal Democrats	Joan Labrom	395		
Conservative	Robert Curtis	337	12.6	
Conservative	Michael Lee	328		
Independent	Nicholas Ingham	324	12.1	
Conservative	Ruth Jeayes	273		
Turnout			24.9	
Labour hold		Swing		
Labour hold		Swing		
Labour hold		Swing		

=== Sydenham ===
Sydenham (3)
Party	Candidate	Votes	%	±%
Labour	Chris Best	1,228	37.8	
Labour	Philip McDermott	1,033		
Labour	Marion Nisbet	1,010		
Conservative	Anthony Bays	800	24.6	
Conservative	Evett McAnuff	662		
Green	David Lea	653	20.1	
Conservative	Bruce de Saram	647		
Liberal Democrats	Catherine Pluygers	568	17.5	
Liberal Democrats	Gerald Thompson	562		
Liberal Democrats	Vijay Naidu	484		
Turnout			28.0	
Labour hold		Swing		
Labour hold		Swing		
Labour hold		Swing		

=== Telegraph Hill ===
Telegraph Hill (3)
Party	Candidate	Votes	%	±%
Socialist	Ian Page	1,118	36.1	
Labour	Robin Cross	997	32.2	
Socialist	Christopher Flood	929		
Labour	Joan Millbank	856		
Labour	Paul Newing	829		
Socialist	Jessica Leech	821		
Green	Kathleen Easton	440	14.2	
Green	Nicholas Stone	427		
Green	Daniel Hudson	413		
Liberal Democrats	Tom Lawrence	303	9.8	
Liberal Democrats	Lucy Penwarden	248		
Conservative	Julie Kitson	235	7.6	
Liberal Democrats	Catherine Polling	202		
Conservative	Russell Wellard	192		
Conservative	Judy Willson	178		
Turnout			29.7	
Socialist hold		Swing		
Labour hold		Swing		
Socialist gain from Local Education Action by Parents				

=== Whitefoot ===
Whitefoot (3)
Party	Candidate	Votes	%	±%
Liberal Democrats	Daniel Houghton	1,346	40.1	
Liberal Democrats	Catherine Priddey	1,209		
Liberal Democrats	Sera Kentman	1,115		
Labour	Jonathan Alltimes	894	26.7	
Labour	Carl Kisicki	742		
Labour	Olurotimi Ogunbadewa	741		
Conservative	James Cleverly	593	17.7	
Conservative	Nicholas Kent	438		
Conservative	Ronald Lee	435		
UKIP	Jens Winton	281	8.4	
Green	Alan Dingle	240	7.2	
Green	Charles Laurie	226		
Green	Simon Opie	170		
Turnout			34.2	
Liberal Democrats hold		Swing		
Liberal Democrats hold		Swing		
Liberal Democrats gain from Labour		Swing		
