= Rachael Maskell =

British politician (born 1972)

Rachael Maskell MP
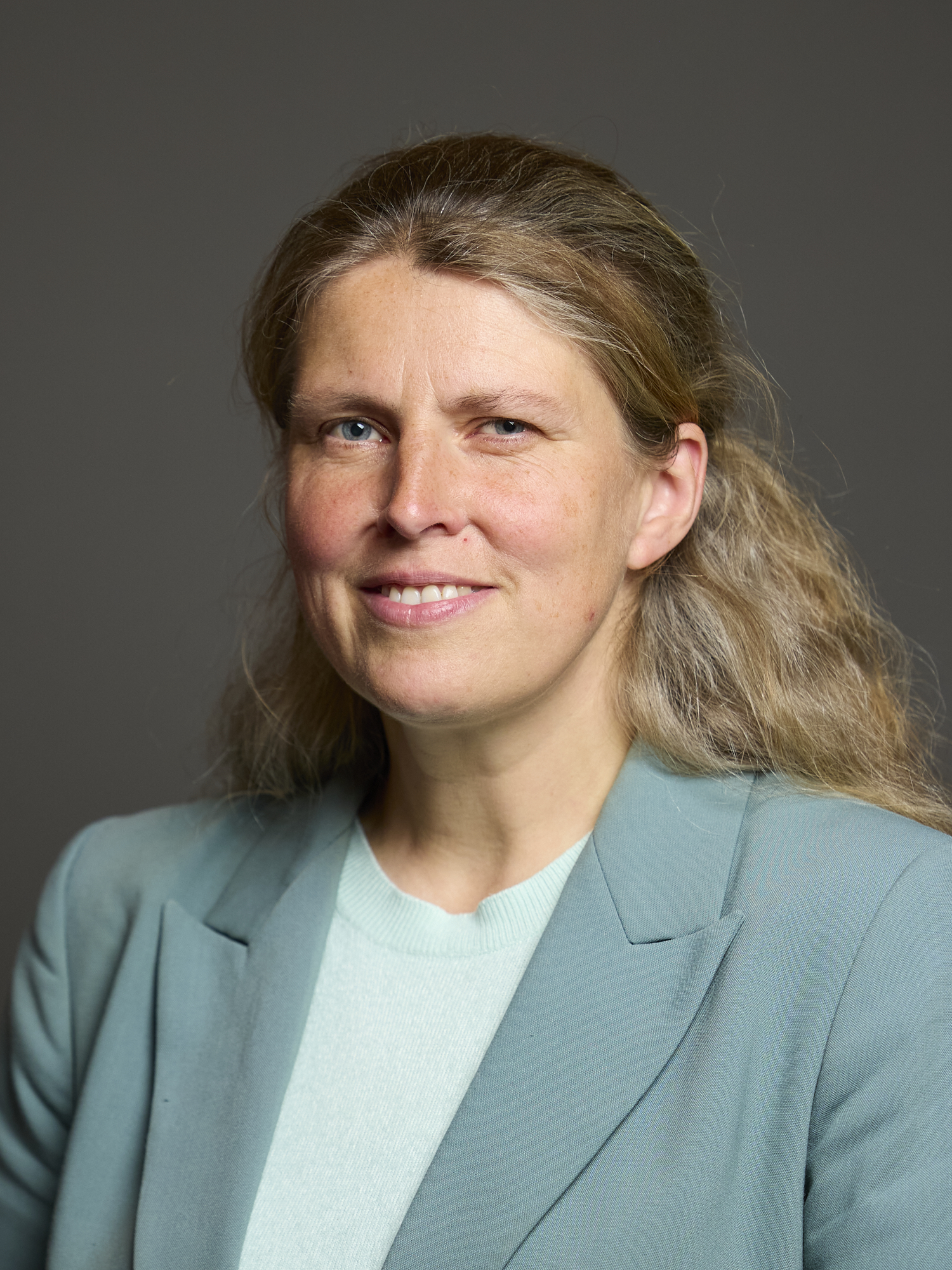
- Official portrait, 2024

Member of Parliament for York Central
- Incumbent
- Assumed office 7 May 2015
- Preceded by: Hugh Bayley
- Majority: 19,154 (44.1%)

Shadow cabinet portfolios
- 2020: Employment Rights
- 2016–2017: Environment, Food and Rural Affairs

Shadow frontbench
- 2021: Arts, Civil Society and Youth
- 2020–2021: Voluntary Sector and Charities
- 2017–2020: Rail
- 2015–2016: Veterans

Personal details
- Born: Rachael Helen Maskell; 5 July 1972 (age 54) Winchester, Hampshire, England
- Party: Labour Co-op
- Education: University of East Anglia (BSc)
- Website: Official website

Rachael Helen Maskell (born 5 July 1972) is a British Labour and Co-operative politician who has served as Member of Parliament (MP) for York Central since 2015. She was Shadow Environment Secretary from 2016 to 2017 and Shadow Employment Secretary in 2020.

== Early life and career ==
Maskell was born in Winchester, and was brought up in Highcliffe-on-Sea. She was influenced to take an interest in politics by her uncle Terence Morris, a close associate of Louis Blom-Cooper, who was a professor of criminology and criminal justice at the London School of Economics. Morris had campaigned for the abolition of the death penalty, in addition to serving as an adviser to the Wilson government and as an academic.

Maskell graduated from the University of East Anglia with a degree in physiotherapy in 1994. She worked as a care-worker and physiotherapist in the National Health Service for 20 years in Norwich and the London Borough of Barnet. Maskell has also been a trade-union official.

In 2006, Maskell stood as a Labour candidate for the Blackheath ward in Lewisham, south east London, but was unsuccessful.

== Parliamentary career ==
=== 1st term (2015–2017) ===
At the 2015 general election, Maskell was elected to Parliament as MP for York Central with 42.4% of the vote and a majority of 6,716. Maskell used her maiden speech to advocate a new mental health hospital in York to replace the ageing Bootham Park. Speaking of the vision of "[the] late member for Ebbw Vale" Aneurin Bevan, she said that "the growing social and financial inequalities manifest themselves in health inequality, and access to vital services is delayed and even denied as a direct result of the £3 billion structural reorganisation that the previous Government introduced."

On Wednesday 8 July 2015, Maskell was one of four Labour MPs elected to the Health Select Committee.

In September 2015, during the European refugee crisis, Maskell called on the UK to open its doors to refugees. Speaking as 20,000 refugees arrived in Munich in one weekend, and as the German Government received 800,000 refugees in 2015, Maskell said that the UK Government must do more. She questioned David Cameron in the House of Commons asking "what criteria has the Prime Minister used to arrive at a figure of just six refugees per constituency per year?" She urged local authorities to help in every way they could and to use every space they had to offer to aid people fleeing war in Syria and Northern Iraq.

Maskell spoke in the Trade-Union Bill 2nd Reading debate on 14 September 2015. She referred the house to her Register of Interests as a member of Unite the Union and declared "I am a proud trade-unionist" – she subsequently voted against the Bill.

Following a period working part of the Shadow Defence Team under Shadow Secretary of State for Defence Maria Eagle, Maskell was appointed Shadow Environment, Food and Rural Affairs Secretary as part of the Labour Party's post-Brexit reshuffle. Maskell resigned from her position ahead of the vote on the second reading in the House of Commons European Union (Notification of Withdrawal) Bill 2017 triggering Article 50, which carried a three-line whip imposed on Labour MPs.

=== 2nd term (2017–2019) ===
Maskell was re-elected as MP for York Central at the snap 2017 general election with an increased vote share of 65.2% and an increased majority of 18,575.

She returned to the Labour front bench on 3 July 2017 as Shadow Rail Minister.

On 5 March 2019, Maskell joined a dozen other Labour MPs on Westminster Bridge, next to the Houses of Parliament, in a protest against Brexit under the banner "Love Socialism Hate Brexit".

She was one of five Labour MPs to vote against the extension of abortion rights to Northern Ireland. During votes on the same bill, she also abstained on extending same-sex marriage to Northern Ireland.

=== 3rd term (2019–2024) ===
At the 2019 general election, Maskell was again re-elected, with a decreased vote share of 55.2% and a decreased majority of 13,545.

Maskell endorsed Clive Lewis in the 2020 Labour Party leadership election. In January 2020, Maskell was returned to the Shadow Cabinet as Shadow Secretary of State for Employment Rights, replacing Laura Pidcock, who lost her seat in the 2019 general election.

On 14 December 2021, Maskell resigned from her frontbench role in order to defy the party whip by voting against mandatory COVID-19 vaccinations for NHS staff. She also voted in line with the party whip by voting in favour of COVID-19 vaccine passports and an expansion of mask mandates.

On 22 June 2022, Maskell was the only Labour MP to vote against extension of abortion services in Northern Ireland.

In 2023 Maskell suggested that English local councils should introduce maximum speed limits of 10 mph in residential areas.

=== 4th term (2024–) ===
At the 2024 general election, Maskell was again re-elected, with an increased vote share of 56.6% and an increased majority of 19,154.

Maskell, in her capacity as chair of the Dying Well APPG, became the leading voice against Kim Leadbeater's proposed assisted dying bill. She opposes her party's decision to introduce VAT on private school fees, believing that the policy will affect children with special needs.

On 5 November 2024, Maskell tabled an early day motion calling for the introduction of a "Gaza Family Visa Scheme" based on the Ukraine Family Scheme, which would allow those affected by the Gaza war to seek refuge in the UK.

On 16 July 2025, Maskell was suspended from the Parliamentary Labour Party and had the whip withdrawn following repeated breaches of party discipline, including leading a rebellion against proposed welfare reforms and voting against the final bill despite concessions from the leadership. Following her suspension, Maskell stated that her decision to vote against the bill was based on conscience and concern for constituents affected by the reforms. She described herself as "Labour to the core" and expressed disappointment rather than anger. In interviews, she emphasised her belief in constructive dialogue and indicated she had spoken with the Chief Whip about a possible return to the party. Maskell also questioned the disciplinary process, suggesting that engagement with backbenchers could strengthen party unity.

On 7 November 2025, the whip was restored.

On 5 February 2026, Maskell raised what she described as "serious questions" about Prime Minister Keir Starmer's position following controversy surrounding the appointment of Peter Mandelson as British Ambassador to the United States in 2024. Speaking to ITV News Tyne Tees, she questioned Starmer’s judgement in light of reports about Mandelson’s associations and suggested there were concerns within the Labour Party about the government’s leadership. When asked whether the Prime Minister should resign, Maskell said there was a "serious question over his position".

== Personal life ==
Maskell is a Christian. She is a keen cyclist and rode the trip to the 2015 Labour Party Conference in Brighton from Parliament in aid of the British Heart Foundation.

Parliament of the United Kingdom
Preceded by Hugh Bayley	Member of Parliament for York Central; 2015–present	Incumbent
Political offices
Preceded by Kerry McCarthy	Shadow Secretary of State for Environment, Food and Rural Affairs; 2016–2017	Succeeded by Sue Hayman
