= Conal Gregory =

British politician

Member of Parliament for York
- In office 9 June 1983 – 16 March 1992
- Preceded by: Alex Lyon
- Succeeded by: Hugh Bayley

Personal details
- Born: Conal Robert Gregory; 11 March 1947 (age 78)
- Political party: Conservative
- Education: King’s College School
- Alma mater: University of Sheffield

Conal Robert Gregory (born 11 March 1947) was Conservative Member of Parliament for York from 1983 to 1992, when he lost the seat to Labour Party candidate Hugh Bayley.

He was educated at King's College School, Wimbledon and the University of Sheffield. He is a Master of Wine and has worked for many years in the wine trade. He is the author of a number of publications on the subject. He became a journalist writing for the Financial Times, Guardian and was made the personal Financial Editor of the Yorkshire Post, winning Regional Financial Journalist of the Year Award in 2016

Parliament of the United Kingdom
Preceded by Alex Lyon	Member of Parliament for the City of York; 1983–1992	Succeeded by Hugh Bayley
