= List of electoral wards in County Durham =

This is a list of electoral divisions and wards in the ceremonial county of Durham in North East England. All changes since the re-organisation of local government following the passing of the Local Government Act 1972 are shown. The number of councillors elected for each electoral division or ward is shown in brackets.

== Current councils ==
=== Durham ===
This is about the area covered by the former non-metropolitan county and its successor unitary authority.

Electoral Divisions from 1 April 1974 (first election 12 April 1973) to 7 May 1981:

1. Barnard Castle (1)
2. Bishop Auckland No. 1 (1)
3. Bishop Auckland No. 2 (1)
4. Bishop Auckland No. 3 (1)
5. Bishop Auckland No. 4 (1)
6. Brandon No. 1 (1)
7. Brandon No. 2 (1)
8. Chester-le-Street No. 1 (1)
9. Chester-le-Street No. 2 (1)
10. Chester-le-Street No. 3 (1)
11. Chester-le-Street Rural No. 1 (1)
12. Chester-le-Street Rural No. 2 (1)
13. Chester-le-Street Rural No. 3 (1)
14. Consett No. 1 (1)
15. Consett No. 2 (1)
16. Consett No. 3 (1)
17. Consett No. 4 (1)
18. Crook & Willington No. 1 (1)
19. Crook & Willington No. 2 (1)
20. Crook & Willington No. 3 (1)
21. Darlington No. 1 (1)
22. Darlington No. 2 (Cockerton) (1)
23. Darlington No. 3 (Eastbourne) (1)
24. Darlington No. 4 (Harrowgate Hill) (1)
25. Darlington No. 5 (Haughton) (1)
26. Darlington No. 6 (Lingfield) (1)
27. Darlington No. 7 (North Road) (1)
28. Darlington No. 8 (Pierremont) (1)
29. Darlington No. 9 (South) (1)
30. Darlington No. 10 (West) (1)
31. Darlington Rural No. 1 (1)
32. Darlington Rural No. 2 (1)
33. Darlington Rural No. 3 (1)
34. Durham No. 1 (Framwellgate) (1)
35. Durham No. 2 (1)
36. Durham No. 3 (1)
37. Durham Rural No. 1 (Coxhoe) (1)
38. Durham Rural No. 2 (Sherburn) (1)
39. Durham Rural No. 3 (1)
40. Durham Rural No. 4 (1)
41. Easington No. 1 (Blackhalls) (1)
42. Easington No. 2 (Horden) (1)
43. Easington No. 3 (Shotton) (1)
44. Easington No. 4 (Thornley) (1)
45. Easington No. 5 (Wingate) (1)
46. Easington No. 6 (1)
47. Easington No. 7 (1)
48. Easington No. 8 (1)
49. Easington No. 9 (1)
50. Esh (1)
51. Evenwood (1)
52. Lanchester (1)
53. Seaham No. 1 (1)
54. Seaham No. 2 (1)
55. Seaham No. 3 (1)
56. Sedgefield No. 1 (Cornforth) (1)
57. Sedgefield No. 2 (Ferryhill) (1)
58. Sedgefield No. 3 (1)
59. Sedgefield No. 4 (1)
60. Shildon No. 1 (1)
61. Shildon No. 2 (1)
62. Spennymoor No. 1 (1)
63. Spennymoor No. 2 (1)
64. Staindrop (1)
65. Stanhope (1)
66. Stanley No. 1 (1)
67. Stanley No. 2 (1)
68. Stanley No. 3 (1)
69. Stanley No. 4 (1)
70. Stanley No. 5 (1)
71. Startforth (1)
72. Wolsingham (1)

Electoral Divisions from 7 May 1981 to 5 May 2005:

1. Annfield Plain (1)
2. Aycliffe East (1)
3. Aycliffe North (1)
4. Aycliffe West (1)
5. Barnard Castle East (1)
6. Barnard Castle West (1)
7. Belmont (1)
8. Benfieldside (1)
9. Bishop Auckland Town (1)
10. Blackhalls (1)
11. Brandon (1)
12. Burnopfield & Dipton (1)
13. Chester le Street Central (1)
14. Chester le Street North East (1)
15. Chester le Street South (1)
16. Chilton (1)
17. Cockerton (1); electoral division abolished in 1997
18. Consett (1)
19. Coundon (1)
20. Coxhoe (1)
21. Craghead & South Moor (1)
22. Crook North (1)
23. Crook South (1)
24. Darlington Rural (1); electoral division abolished in 1997
25. Dawdon (1)
26. Deerness Valley (1)
27. Delves Lane (1)
28. Deneside (1)
29. Easington (1)
30. Eastbourne (1); electoral division abolished in 1997
31. Elvet (1)
32. Esh (1)
33. Evenwood (1)
34. Ferryhill (1)
35. Framwellgate Moor (1)
36. Gilesgate (1)
37. Harrowgate Hill (1); electoral division abolished in 1997
38. Haughton (1); electoral division abolished in 1997
39. Horden (1)
40. Hurworth (1); electoral division abolished in 1997
41. Lanchester (1)
42. Leadgate & Medomsley (1)
43. Lingfield (1); electoral division abolished in 1997
44. Lumley (1)
45. Mowden (1); electoral division abolished in 1997
46. Murton (1)
47. Nevilles Cross (1)
48. Newton Hall (1)
49. Northgate (1); electoral division abolished in 1997
50. Park (1); electoral division abolished in 1997
51. Pelton (1)
52. Peterlee Central (1)
53. Peterlee Dene (1)
54. Pierremont (1); electoral division abolished in 1997
55. Sacriston (1)
56. Seaham (1)
57. Sedgefield (1)
58. Sherburn (1)
59. Shildon North East (1)
60. Shildon South West (1)
61. Shotton (1)
62. Spennymoor (1)
63. Stanley (1)
64. Tanfield (1)
65. Thornley (1)
66. Trimdon (1)
67. Tudhoe (1)
68. Weardale (1)
69. West Auckland (1)
70. Willington (1)
71. Wingate (1)
72. Woodhouse Close (1)

Electoral Divisions from 5 May 2005 to 2 May 2013:

1. Annfield Plain (1)
2. Aycliffe East (1)
3. Aycliffe North (1)
4. Aycliffe West (1)
5. Barnard Castle East (1)
6. Barnard Castle West (1)
7. Belmont (1)
8. Benfieldside (1)
9. Bishop Auckland Town (1)
10. Blackhalls (1)
11. Brandon (1)
12. Burnopfield & Dipton (1)
13. Chester-le-Street North & East (1)
14. Chester-le-Street South (1)
15. Chester-le-Street West Central (1)
16. Chilton (1)
17. Consett North (1)
18. Coundon (1)
19. Coxhoe (1)
20. Craghead & South Moor (1)
21. Crook North & Tow Law (1)
22. Crook South (1)
23. Dawdon (1)
24. Deerness Valley (1)
25. Delves Lane & Consett South (1)
26. Deneside (1)
27. Durham South (1)
28. Easington (1)
29. Elvet (1)
30. Esh (1)
31. Evenwood (1)
32. Ferryhill (1)
33. Framwellgate Moor (1)
34. Gilesgate (1)
35. Horden (1)
36. Lanchester (1)
37. Leadgate & Medomsley (1)
38. Lumley (1)
39. Murton (1)
40. Neville’s Cross (1)
41. Newton Hall (1)
42. Ouston & Urpeth (1)
43. Pelton (1)
44. Peterlee East (1)
45. Peterlee West (1)
46. Sacriston (1)
47. Seaham (1)
48. Sedgefield (1)
49. Sherburn (1)
50. Shildon East (1)
51. Shildon West (1)
52. Shotton (1)
53. Spennymoor & Middlestone (1)
54. Stanley (1)
55. Tanfield (1)
56. Thornley (1)
57. Trimdon (1)
58. Tudhoe (1)
59. Weardale (1)
60. West Auckland (1)
61. Willington (1)
62. Wingate (1)
63. Woodhouse Close (1)

All Electoral Divisions were changed to (2) in 2008

Electoral Divisions from 2 May 2013 to 1 May 2025:

1. Annfield Plain (2)
2. Aycliffe East (2)
3. Aycliffe North & Middridge (3)
4. Aycliffe West (2)
5. Barnard Castle East (2)
6. Barnard Castle West (2)
7. Belmont (3)
8. Benfieldside (2)
9. Bishop Auckland Town (2)
10. Bishop Middleham & Cornforth (1)
11. Blackhalls (2)
12. Brandon (2)
13. Burnopfield & Dipton (2)
14. Chester-le-Street East (1)
15. Chester-le-Street North (1)
16. Chester-le-Street South (2)
17. Chester-le-Street West Central (2)
18. Chilton (1)
19. Consett North (2)
20. Consett South (1)
21. Coundon (1)
22. Coxhoe (3)
23. Craghead & South Moor (2)
24. Crook (3)
25. Dawdon (2)
26. Deerness (3)
27. Delves Lane (2)
28. Deneside (2)
29. Durham South (1)
30. Easington (2)
31. Elvet & Gilesgate (2)
32. Esh & Witton Gilbert (2)
33. Evenwood (2)
34. Ferryhill (3)
35. Framwellgate & Newton Hall (3)
36. Horden (2)
37. Lanchester (2)
38. Leadgate & Medomsley (2)
39. Lumley (2)
40. Murton (2)
41. Neville’s Cross (2)
42. North Lodge (1)
43. Passfield (1)
44. Pelton (3)
45. Peterlee East (2)
46. Peterlee West (2)
47. Sacriston (2)
48. Seaham (2)
49. Sedgefield (2)
50. Sherburn (2)
51. Shildon & Dene Valley (3)
52. Shotton & South Hetton (2)
53. Spennymoor (3)
54. Stanley (2)
55. Tanfield (2)
56. Tow Law (1)
57. Trimdon & Thornley (3)
58. Tudhoe (2)
59. Weardale (2)
60. West Auckland (2)
61. Willington & Hunwick (2)
62. Wingate (1)
63. Woodhouse Close (2)

Electoral Divisions from 1 May 2025 to present:

1. Annfield Plain & Tanfield (2)
2. Aycliffe North & Middridge (2)
3. Aycliffe South (3)
4. Barnard Castle (1)
5. Belmont (2)
6. Benfieldside (2)
7. Bishop Auckland (3)
8. Blackhalls & Hesledens (1)
9. Bowburn & Coxhoe (3)
10. Brandon (2)
11. Castle Eden & Passfield (1)
12. Chester-le-Street North (2)
13. Chester-le-Street South (2)
14. Chilton (1)
15. Consett North (1)
16. Consett South (1)
17. Craghead & South Moor (2)
18. Crook (3)
19. Dalton & Dawdon (2)
20. Deerness (2)
21. Delves Lane (2)
22. Derwent & Pont Valley (3)
23. Easington & Shotton (3)
24. Elvet, Gilesgate & Shincliffe (2)
25. Evenwood (1)
26. Ferryhill (2)
27. Framwellgate & Newton Hall (3)
28. Horden & Dene House (2)
29. Lanchester & Burnhope (1)
30. Langley & Esh (1)
31. Lower Teesdale (2)
32. Lumley & West Rainton (2)
33. Murton(2)
34. Neville’s Cross (2)
35. North Lodge (1)
36. Pelton (3)
37. Peterlee (2)
38. Pittington & Sherburn (1)
39. Sacriston & Witton Gilbert (2)
40. Seaham (2)
41. Sedgefield (2)
42. Shildon & Dene Valley (3)
43. Spennymoor (2)
44. Stanley (2)
45. Thornley & Wheatley Hill (1)
46. Trimdon & Wingate (2)
47. Tudhoe (2)
48. Upper Teesdale (1)
49. Weardale (2)
50. West Auckland (2)
51. Willington & Hunwick (2)

=== Darlington ===
Wards from 1 April 1974 (first election 7 June 1973) to 3 May 1979:

1. No. 1 (Harrowgate Hill) (3)
2. No. 2 (North Road) (3)
3. No. 3 (Cockerton) (5)
4. No. 4 (Central & Northgate) (4)
5. No. 5 (Pierremont) (4)
6. No. 6 (Haughton) (4)
7. No. 7 (Eastbourne) (6)
8. No. 8 (West) (6)
9. No. 9 (South) (4)
10. No. 10 (Lingfield) (4)
11. Heighington (1)
12. Hurworth (2)
13. Middleton St George (1)
14. Sadberge (1)
15. Whessoe (1)

Wards from 3 May 1979 to 1 May 2003:

Wards from 1 May 2003 to 7 May 2015:

1. Bank Top (2)
2. Central (2)
3. Cockerton East (3)
4. Cockerton West (2)
5. College (2)
6. Eastbourne (3)
7. Faverdale (1)
8. Harrowgate Hill (3)
9. Haughton East (2)
10. Haughton North (2)
11. Haughton West (3)
12. Heighington & Coniscliffe (2)
13. Hummersknott (2)
14. Hurworth (2)
15. Lascelles (2)
16. Lingfield (2)
17. Middleton St George (2)
18. Mowden (2)
19. Northgate (2)
20. North Road (3)
21. Park East (3)
22. Park West (2)
23. Pierremont (3)
24. Sadberge & Whessoe (1)

Wards from 7 May 2015 to present:

1. Bank Top & Lascelles (3)
2. Brinkburn & Faverdale (3)
3. Cockerton (3)
4. College (2)
5. Eastbourne (3)
6. Harrowgate Hill (3)
7. Haughton & Springfield (3)
8. Heighington & Coniscliffe (2)
9. Hummersknott (2)
10. Hurworth (2)
11. Mowden (2)
12. North Road (3)
13. Northgate (2)
14. Park East (3)
15. Park West (2)
16. Pierremont (3)
17. Red Hall & Lingfield (2)
18. Sadberge & Middleton St George (3)
19. Stephenson (2)
20. Whinfield (2)

=== Hartlepool ===
Wards from 1 April 1974 (first election 7 June 1973) to 6 May 1976:

1. No. 8 (Stranton) (3)
2. No. 10 (Jackson) (3)
3. No. 11 (Throston) (3)
4. No. 12 (Dyke House) (3)
5. No. 15 (Hart) (3)
6. No. 16 (Greatham) (1)
7. Brinkburn (3)
8. Brus (3)
9. Fens (3)
10. Grange (3)
11. Owton (3)
12. Park (3)
13. Rift House (3)
14. Rossmere (3)
15. Seaton (3)
16. St Hilda (3)

Wards from 6 May 1976 to 10 June 2004:

Wards from 10 June 2004 to 3 May 2012:

1. Brus (3)
2. Burn Valley (3)
3. Dyke House (3)
4. Elwick (1)
5. Fens (3)
6. Foggy Furze (3)
7. Grange (3)
8. Greatham (1)
9. Hart (3)
10. Owton (3)
11. Park (3)
12. Rift House (3)
13. Rossmere (3)
14. St Hilda (3)
15. Seaton (3)
16. Stranton (3)
17. Throston (3)

Wards from 3 May 2012 to 6 May 2021:

1. Burn Valley (3)
2. De Bruce (3)
3. Fens & Rossmere (3)
4. Foggy Furze (3)
5. Hart (3)
6. Headland & Harbour (3)
7. Jesmond (3)
8. Manor House (3)
9. Rural West (3)
10. Seaton (3)
11. Victoria (3)

Wards from 6 May 2021 to present:

1. Burn Valley (3)
2. De Bruce (3)
3. Fens and Greatham (3)
4. Foggy Furze (3)
5. Hart (3)
6. Headland and Harbour (3)
7. Manor House (3)
8. Rossmere (3)
9. Rural West (3)
10. Seaton (3)
11. Throston (3)
12. Victoria (3)

=== Stockton-on-Tees ===
Wards from 1 April 1974 (first election 7 June 1973) to 3 May 1979:

1. No. 1 (Billingham East) (6)
2. No. 2 (Billingham West) (7)
3. No. 3 (Grangefield) (4)
4. No. 4 (Hartburn) (6)
5. No. 5 (Mile House) (7)
6. No. 6 (North End) (4)
7. No. 7 (Norton) (6)
8. No. 8 (Stockton South) (4)
9. No. 9 (Thornaby East) (5)
10. No. 10 (Thornaby West) (4)
11. No. 11 (Egglescliffe) (3)
12. No. 12 (Preston) (1)
13. No. 13 (Wolviston) (1)
14. No. 14 (Yarm) (2)

Wards from 3 May 1979 to 5 May 2005:

Wards from 5 May 2005 to 4 May 2023:

1. Billingham Central (2)
2. Billingham East (2)
3. Billingham North (3)
4. Billingham South (2)
5. Billingham West (2)
6. Bishopsgarth & Elm Tree (2)
7. Eaglescliffe (3)
8. Fairfield (2)
9. Grangefield (2)
10. Hardwick (2); renamed Hardwick & Salters Lane in 2014
11. Hartburn (2)
12. Ingleby Barwick East (3)
13. Ingleby Barwick West (3)
14. Mandale & Victoria (3)
15. Newtown (2)
16. Northern Parishes (1)
17. Norton North (2)
18. Norton South (2)
19. Norton West (2)
20. Parkfield & Oxbridge (2)
21. Roseworth (2)
22. Stainsby Hill (2)
23. Stockton Town Centre (2)
24. Village (2)
25. Western Parishes (1)
26. Yarm (3)

Wards from 4 May 2023 to present:

1. Billingham Central (2)
2. Billingham East (2)
3. Billingham North (2)
4. Billingham South (2)
5. Billingham West & Wolviston (2)
6. Bishopsgarth & Elm Tree (2)
7. Eaglescliffe East (2)
8. Eaglescliffe West (2)
9. Fairfield (3)
10. Grangefield (1)
11. Hardwick & Salters Lane (2)
12. Hartburn (3)
13. Ingleby Barwick North (3)
14. Ingleby Barwick South (3)
15. Mandale & Victoria (2)
16. Newtown (1)
17. Northern Parishes (2)
18. Norton Central (2)
19. Norton North (2)
20. Norton South (2)
21. Ropner (2)
22. Roseworth (2)
23. Southern Villages (1)
24. Stainsby Hill (2)
25. Stockton Town Centre (2)
26. Village (2)
27. Yarm (3)

== Former councils ==
=== Cleveland ===
Electoral Divisions from 1 April 1974 (first election 12 April 1973) to 2 May 1985:

1. Acklam (3)
2. Ayresome (2)
3. Berwick Hills (3)
4. Billingham East (3)
5. Billingham West (3)
6. Brinkburn (1)
7. Brus (1)
8. Coatham (2)
9. Dyke House (1)
10. Eston Grange (3)
11. Fens (1)
12. Grange (1)
13. Grangefield (2)
14. Gresham (2)
15. Guisborough East (1)
16. Guisborough West (1)
17. Hart (1)
18. Hartburn (3)
19. Jackson (1)
20. Kirkleatham (2)
21. Linthorpe (3)
22. Loftus (1)
23. Marske (2)
24. Marton & Nunthorpe (2)
25. Mile House (3)
26. North End (2)
27. North Ormesby (2)
28. Norton (2)
29. Ormesby (3)
30. Owton (1)
31. Park (1)
32. Redcar (2)
33. Rift House (1)
34. Rossmere (1)
35. Saltburn (1)
36. Seaton (1)
37. Skelton & Brotton No. 1 (1)
38. Skelton & Brotton No. 2 (1)
39. South Bank (3)
40. St Hilda (1)
41. St Hildas (2)
42. Stockton Rural No. 1 (1)
43. Stockton Rural No. 2 (1)
44. Stockton South (2)
45. Stokesley (1)
46. Stranton (1)
47. Thornaby East (2)
48. Thornaby West (2)
49. Thorntree (2)
50. Throston (1)
51. Tollesby (3)

Electoral Divisions from 2 May 1985 to 1 April 1996 (county abolished):

1. Ayresome (1)
2. Belle Vue (1)
3. Berwick Hills (1)
4. Bishopsgarth (1)
5. Blue Hall (1)
6. Boundary (1)
7. Brierton (1)
8. Britannia (1)
9. Brookfield (1)
10. Brotton & Skinningthorpe (1)
11. Brus (1)
12. Burn (1)
13. Cambridge Road (1)
14. Cargo Fleet (1)
15. Catcote (1)
16. Charltons (1)
17. College Road (1)
18. Coulby Newham (1)
19. Dormanstown (1)
20. Dyke House (1)
21. Egglescliffe (1)
22. Eston (1)
23. Fairfield (1)
24. Foggy Furze (1)
25. Glebe (1)
26. Golden Flatts (1)
27. Grangefield (1)
28. Grangetown (1)
29. Gresham (1)
30. Guisborough (1)
31. Hardwick (1)
32. Hartburn (1)
33. Ingleby Barwick (1)
34. Jackson (1)
35. Kader (1)
36. Kirkleatham (1)
37. Lingdale (1)
38. Loftus (1)
39. Longbeck (1)
40. Low Grange (1)
41. Mandale (1)
42. Marsh House (1)
43. Marton Grove (1)
44. Middlesbrough Park (1)
45. Mile House (1)
46. Mill Hill (1)
47. Mowbray (1)
48. Netherby (1)
49. Newcomen (1)
50. Newham Grange (1)
51. Newton under Roseberry (1)
52. Normanby (1)
53. Norton (1)
54. Ormesby (1)
55. Park End (1)
56. Parkfield (1)
57. Preston Whitton & Wolviston (1)
58. Roworth (1)
59. Rye Hill (1)
60. Saltburn (1)
61. Sandy Lane (1)
62. Skelton (1)
63. South Bank (1)
64. St Anns (1)
65. St Cuthberts (1)
66. St Germains (1)
67. St Hildas (1)
68. Stadium (1)
69. Stewart Park (1)
70. Teesville (1)
71. Throston (1)
72. Tollesby (1)
73. Victoria (1)
74. Village (1)
75. West Dyke (1)
76. Yarm (1)
77. Zetland Park (1)

=== Chester-le-Street ===
Wards from 1 April 1974 (first election 7 June 1973) to 3 May 1979:

1. No. 1 (Chester South) (5)
2. No. 2 (Chester Central) (1)
3. No. 3 (Chester West) (3)
4. No. 4 (Chester North) (4)
5. No. 5 (Pelton Fell) (2)
6. No. 6 (Bournmoor) (3)
7. No. 7 (Edmondsley & Waldridge) (1)
8. No. 9 (Lumley) (2)
9. No. 11 (Pelton & Grange Villa) (4)
10. North Lodge (1)
11. Ouston (2)
12. Plawsworth (1)
13. Sacriston (3)
14. Urpeth (1)

Wards from 3 May 1979 to 1 May 2003:

Wards from 1 May 2003 to 1 April 2009 (district abolished):

1. Bournmoor (2)
2. Chester Central (2)
3. Chester East (2)
4. Chester North (3)
5. Chester South (2)
6. Chester West (2)
7. Edmondsley & Waldridge (3)
8. Grange Villa & West Pelton (1)
9. Kimblesworth & Plawsworth (1)
10. Lumley (3)
11. North Lodge (2)
12. Ouston (2)
13. Pelton (3)
14. Pelton Fell (1)
15. Sacriston (3)
16. Urpeth (2)

=== Derwentside ===
Wards from 1 April 1974 (first election 7 June 1973) to 3 May 1979:

1. No. 1 (Ebchester) (1)
2. No. 2 (Medomsley) (2)
3. No. 3 (Leadgate) (3)
4. No. 5 (Blackhill) (3)
5. No. 6 (Consett North) (2)
6. No. 7 (Delves Lane & Crookhall) (4)
7. No. 8 (Consett South) (3)
8. No. 12 (Catchgate) (2)
9. No. 13 (Annfield Plain) (2)
10. No. 14 (South Moor) (3)
11. No. 15 (Havannah) (4)
12. No. 16 (Towneley) (5)
13. No. 17 (Craghead) (2)
14. No. 18 (Lanchester) (4)
15. No. 19 (Cornsay) (1)
16. No. 21 (Castleside) (1)
17. Benfieldside (3)
18. Burnopfield (3)
19. Dipton (2)
20. Esh (3)
21. Tanfield (2)

Wards from 3 May 1979 to 1 May 2003:

Wards from 1 May 2003 to 1 April 2009 (district abolished):

1. Annfield Plain (3)
2. Benfieldside (3)
3. Blackhill (3)
4. Burnhope (1)
5. Burnopfield (3)
6. Castleside (1)
7. Catchgate (2)
8. Consett East (2)
9. Consett North (3)
10. Consett South (2)
11. Cornsay (1)
12. Craghead & South Stanley (3)
13. Delves Lane (3)
14. Dipton (2)
15. Ebchester & Medomsley (3)
16. Esh (3)
17. Havannah (3)
18. Lanchester (3)
19. Leadgate (3)
20. South Moor (3)
21. Stanley Hall (3)
22. Tanfield (3)

=== Durham ===
Wards from 1 April 1974 (first election 7 June 1973) to 3 May 1979:

1. No. 1 (Durham: Nevilles Cross) (3)
2. No. 2 (Durham: Framwellgate) (6)
3. No. 3 (Durham: Crossgate) (2)
4. No. 4 (Durham: Elvet) (2)
5. No. 5 (Durham: St Nicholas) (2)
6. No. 6 (Durham: Gilesgate) (3)
7. No. 7 (Durham: Pelaw) (2)
8. No. 9 (Brandon: East) (1)
9. No. 10 (Brandon: South) (1)
10. No. 15 (Belmont & Carrville) (6)
11. No. 17 (Coxhoe) (3)
12. No. 19 (Kelloe) (1)
13. No. 20 (Pittington) (1)
14. No. 25 (West Rainton) (2)
15. Bearpark (2)
16. Brandon (3)
17. Cassop cum Quarrinton (4)
18. Croxdale (1)
19. Deerness (3)
20. Framwellgate Moor (3)
21. New Brancepeth (1)
22. Shadforth (1)
23. Sherburn (2)
24. Shincliffe (1)
25. Ushaw Moor (3)
26. Witton Gilbert (2)

Wards from 3 May 1979 to 1 May 2003:

Wards from 1 May 2003 to 1 April 2009 (district abolished):

1. Bearpark & Witton Gilbert (3)
2. Belmont (2)
3. Brancepeth, Langley Moor & Meadowfield (2)
4. Brandon (3)
5. Carrville & Gilesgate Moor (3)
6. Cassop-cum-Quarrington (3)
7. Coxhoe (3)
8. Crossgate & Framwelgate (3)
9. Deerness (2)
10. Elvet (3)
11. Framwellgate Moor (3)
12. Neville’s Cross (2)
13. New Brancepeth & Ushaw Moor (3)
14. Newton Hall North (2)
15. Newton Hall South (2)
16. Pelaw & Gilesgate (3)
17. Pittington & West Rainton (2)
18. St Nicholas (2)
19. Shadforth & Sherburn (3)
20. Shincliffe (1)

=== Easington ===
Wards from 1 April 1974 (first election 7 June 1973) to 3 May 1979:

1. No. 1 (Park-Seaham-South) (5)
2. No. 2 (Deneside & High Colliery) (4)
3. No. 6 (East Murton) (6)
4. No. 9 (Horden) (6)
5. No. 10 (Hutton Henry) (1)
6. No. 11 (Monkhesleden) (4)
7. Acre Rigg (3)
8. Dawdon (4)
9. Deaf Hill (1)
10. Dene House (3)
11. Easington Colliery (4)
12. Easington Village (1)
13. Eden Hill (3)
14. Haswell (1)
15. Howletch (1)
16. Passfield (1)
17. Shotton (3)
18. South Hetton (2)
19. Thornley (2)
20. Wheatley Hill (3)
21. Wingate (2)

Wards from 3 May 1979 to 1 May 2003:

Wards from 1 May 2003 to 1 April 2009 (district abolished):

1. Acre Rigg (2)
2. Blackhalls (3)
3. Dawdon (3)
4. Dene House (2)
5. Deneside (3)
6. Easington Colliery (3)
7. Easington Village & South Hetton (3)
8. Eden Hill (2)
9. Haswell & Shotton (3)
10. Horden North (3)
11. Horden South (2)
12. Howletch (2)
13. Hutton Henry (1)
14. Murton East (2)
15. Murton West (2)
16. Passfield (3)
17. Seaham Harbour (3)
18. Seaham North (3)
19. Thornley & Wheatley Hill (3)
20. Wingate (3)

=== Sedgefield ===
Wards from 1 April 1974 (first election 7 June 1973) to 5 May 1983:

1. No. 5 (Tudhoe) (4)
2. No. 6 (Low Spennymoor) (2)
3. No. 12 (Woodham) (2)
4. No. 15 (Broom & Chilton) (4)
5. No. 16 (Bishop Middleham & Cornforth) (3)
6. No. 17 (Windlestone) (3)
7. No. 18 (Trimdon) (5)
8. Byerley (3)
9. Ferryhill (3)
10. Middlestone (3)
11. Middridge (1)
12. Neville (2)
13. Sedgefield (3)
14. Shafto (2)
15. Simpasture (2)
16. Spennymoor (3)
17. Sunnydale (2)
18. Thickley (3)
19. West (3)

Wards from 5 May 1983 to 1 May 2003:

Wards from 1 May 2003 to 1 April 2009 (district abolished):

1. Bishop Middleham & Cornforth (2)
2. Broom (3)
3. Byerley (2)
4. Chilton (3)
5. Ferryhill (3)
6. Fishburn & Old Trimdon (3)
7. Greenfield Middridge (3)
8. Low Spennymoor & Tudhoe Grange (3)
9. Middlestone (3)
10. Neville & Simpasture (3)
11. New Trimdon & Trimdon Grange (1)
12. Sedgefield (3)
13. Shafto St Marys (3)
14. Spennymoor (3)
15. Sunnydale (2)
16. Thickley (2)
17. Tudhoe (2)
18. West (3)
19. Woodham (3)

=== Teesdale ===
Wards from 1 April 1974 (first election 7 June 1973) to 5 May 1983:

1. No. 1 (Barnard Castle) (6)
2. No. 5 (Staindrop) (2)
3. No. 7 (Lynesack & Softley) (2)
4. No. 11 (Evenwood & Barony) (3)
5. Barningham & Ovington (1)
6. Cockfield (2)
7. Cotherstone with Lartington (1)
8. Eggleston (1)
9. Etherley (2)
10. Gainford & Winston (2)
11. Greta (1)
12. Ingleton (1)
13. Middleton in Teesdale (2)
14. Romaldkirk (1)
15. Startforth with Boldron (1)
16. Streatlam & Whorlton (1)

Wards from 5 May 1983 to 1 May 2003:

Wards from 1 May 2003 to 1 April 2009 (district abolished):

1. Barnard Castle East (2)
2. Barnard Castle North (2)
3. Barnard Castle West (3)
4. Barningham & Ovington (1)
5. Cockfield (2)
6. Cotherstone with Lartington (1)
7. Eggleston (1)
8. Etherley (3)
9. Evenwood, Ramshaw & Lands (3)
10. Gainford & Winston (2)
11. Greta (1)
12. Hamsterley & South Bedburn (1)
13. Ingleton (1)
14. Lynesack (2)
15. Middleton-in-Teesdale (2)
16. Romaldkirk (1)
17. Staindrop (2)
18. Startforth (1)
19. Streatlam & Whorlton (1)

=== Wear Valley ===
Wards from 1 April 1974 (first election 7 June 1973) to 5 May 1983:

1. No. 2 (Cockton Hill) (4)
2. No. 3 (Woodhouse Close) (3)
3. No. 4 (St Helens & West Auckland) (3)
4. No. 7 (West Auckland & Coundon Grange) (3)
5. No. 9 (Crook East) (1)
6. No. 10 (Crook North) (1)
7. No. 11 (Crook South) (2)
8. Bishop Auckland Town (3)
9. Coundon (3)
10. Escomb (1)
11. Howden le Wear (1)
12. Hunwick (1)
13. St Johns Chapel (1)
14. Stanhope (2)
15. Stanley (1)
16. Tow Law (2)
17. Wheatbottom & Helmington Row (2)
18. Willington East (3)
19. Willington West (2)
20. Wolsingham (2)

Wards from 5 May 1983 to 1 May 2003:

Wards from 1 May 2003 to 1 April 2009 (district abolished):

1. Bishop Auckland Town (2)
2. Cockton Hill (3)
3. Coundon (3)
4. Crook North (1)
5. Crook South (3)
6. Dene Valley (2)
7. Escomb (2)
8. Henknowle (2)
9. Howden (1)
10. Hunwick (1)
11. St John’s Chapel (1)
12. Stanhope (2)
13. Tow Law & Stanley (3)
14. West Auckland (3)
15. Wheatbottom & Helmington Row (2)
16. Willington Central (3)
17. Willington West End (1)
18. Wolsingham & Witton-le-Wear (2)
19. Woodhouse Close (3)

== Electoral wards by constituency ==
Wards as they existed on 1 December 2020.

=== Bishop Auckland ===
Durham: Barnard Castle East; Barnard Castle West; Bishop Auckland Town; Coundon; Crook; Evenwood; Shildon & Dene Valley; Tow Law; Weardale; West Auckland; Woodhouse Close.

=== Blaydon and Consett (part) ===
Durham: Benfieldside; Burnopfield and Dipton; Consett North; Consett South; Delves Lane; Leadgate & Medomsley.

=== City of Durham ===
Durham: Belmont; Brandon; Deerness; Durham South; Elvet & Gilesgate; Esh & Witton Gilbert; Framwellgate & Newton Hall; Neville’s Cross; Sherburn; Willington & Hunwick.

=== Darlington ===
Darlington: Bank Top & Lascelles; Brinkburn & Faverdale; Cockerton; College; Eastbourne; Harrowgate Hill; Haughton & Springfield; Heighington & Coniscliffe; Hummersknott; Mowden; North Road; Northgate; Park East; Park West; Pierremont; Red Hall & Lingfield; Stephenson; Whinfield.

=== Easington ===
Durham: Blackhalls; Dawdon; Deneside; Easington; Horden; Murton; Passfield; Peterlee East; Peterlee West; Seaham; Shotton and South Hetton; Trimdon and Thornley (polling districts DKC, EEA, SNA, SNB & SNC); Wingate.

=== Hartlepool ===
Hartlepool: Burn Valley; De Bruce; Fens & Rossmere; Foggy Furze; Hart; Headland & Harbour; Jesmond; Manor House; Rural West; Seaton; Victoria.

=== Newton Aycliffe and Spennymoor ===
Durham: Aycliffe East; Aycliffe North and Middridge; Aycliffe West; Bishop Middleham and Cornforth; Chilton; Coxhoe; Ferryhill; Sedgefield; Spennymoor; Trimdon & Thornley (polling districts SKB, SLA, SLB, SMB & SMC); Tudhoe.

=== North Durham ===
Durham: Annfield Plain; Chester-le-Street East; Chester-le-Street North; Chester-le-Street South; Chester-le-Street West Central; Craghead & South Moor; Lanchester; Lumley; North Lodge; Pelton; Sacriston; Stanley; Tanfield.

=== Stockton North ===
Stockton-on-Tees: Billingham Central; Billingham East; Billingham North; Billingham South; Billingham West; Hardwick & Salters Lane; Newtown; Northern Parishes; Norton North; Norton South; Norton West; Parkfield & Oxbridge; Roseworth; Stockton Town Centre.

=== Stockton West (part) ===
Darlington: Hurworth; Sadberge & Middleton St. George.

Stockton-on-Tees: Bishopsgarth & Elm Tree; Eaglescliffe; Fairfield; Grangefield; Hartburn; Western Parishes.

== See also ==
- List of parliamentary constituencies in County Durham
