= York Central (constituency) =

UK Parliament constituency (since 2010)

Coordinates: 53.957°N 1.082°W

- Borough constituency for the House of Commons
- Boundaries since
- Boundary of York Central in Yorkshire and the Humber
- County: North Yorkshire
- Electorate: 69,608 (December 2019)

Current constituency
- Created: 2010
- Member of Parliament: Rachael Maskell (Labour)
- Seats: One
- Created from: City of York

York Central is a parliamentary constituency (Note: A borough constituency (for the purposes of election expenses and type of returning officer)) represented in the House of Commons of the UK Parliament since 2015 by Rachael Maskell of the Labour and Co-operative Party. (Note: As with all constituencies, the constituency elects one Member of Parliament (MP) by the first past the post system of election at least every five years.)

== Constituency profile ==
The seat covers the historic centre of York which is a significant tourist destination, and surrounding suburbs including Acomb, Clifton and Fishergate. Residents' health and wealth are slightly above the UK averages.

== Creation ==
After the 2005 general election the parliamentary representation in North Yorkshire was reviewed by the Boundary Commission for England, which recommended the division of the former City of York constituency before the 2010 general election leading to two constituencies within the borders of the city of York - York Central is entirely surrounded by York Outer.

York Central is one of only two UK Parliament constituencies to be surrounded by another constituency. Until the 2024 boundary changes, Bath was entirely surrounded by North East Somerset. Since the 2024 boundary changes, Warwick and Leamington is surrounded by Kenilworth and Southam.

== Boundaries ==
Map of 2010–2024 boundaries

2010–2024: The City of York Council wards of: Acomb; Clifton; Fishergate; Guildhall; Heworth; Holgate; Hull Road; Micklegate; and Westfield.

2024–present: As above but with revised ward boundaries.

== Members of Parliament ==
City of York prior to 2010

Election	Member	Party
2010	Sir Hugh Bayley	Labour
2015	Rachael Maskell	Labour Co-op
2025	Rachael Maskell	Independent
2025	Rachael Maskell	Labour Co-op

== Elections ==
=== Elections in the 2020s ===
General election 2024: York Central
Party	Candidate	Votes	%	±%
Labour Co-op	Rachael Maskell	24,537	56.6	▲0.2
Conservative	Richard Hudson	5,383	12.4	▼15.4
Green	Lars Kramm	5,185	12.0	▲7.8
Reform	Cliff Bond	4,721	10.9	▲8.5
Liberal Democrats	Alan Page	3,051	7.0	▼0.8
Independent	Alasdair Lord	133	0.3	new
Independent	Roger James	131	0.3	new
Independent	Ruairi Kendall	98	0.2	new
Independent	Leo Mayne	84	0.2	new
Majority		19,154	44.2	▲15.6
Turnout		43,323	54.5	▼12.4
Registered electors		79,557		
Labour Co-op hold		Swing	▲7.8	

=== Elections in the 2010s ===
2019 notional result
Party	Vote	%
Labour	28,260	56.4
Conservative	13,918	27.8
Liberal Democrats	3,919	7.8
Green	2,098	4.2
Brexit Party	1,216	2.4
Others	691	1.4
Turnout	50,102	66.9
Electorate	74,854	

General election 2019: York Central
Party	Candidate	Votes	%	±%
Labour Co-op	Rachael Maskell	27,312	55.2	−10.0
Conservative	Fabia Tate	13,767	27.8	−2.4
Liberal Democrats	James Blanchard	4,149	8.4	+3.7
Green	Tom Franklin	2,107	4.3	N/A
Brexit Party	Nicholas Szkiler	1,479	3.0	N/A
Yorkshire	Andrew Snedden	557	1.1	N/A
SDP	Andrew Dunn	134	0.3	N/A
Majority		13,545	27.4	−7.6
Turnout		49,505	66.0	−3.7
Labour Co-op hold		Swing	−3.8	

General election 2017: York Central
Party	Candidate	Votes	%	±%
Labour Co-op	Rachael Maskell	34,594	65.2	+22.8
Conservative	Ed Young	16,019	30.2	+1.9
Liberal Democrats	Nick Love	2,475	4.7	−3.3
Majority		18,575	35.0	+20.9
Turnout		53,301	69.7	+5.4
Labour Co-op hold		Swing	+10.45	

General election 2015: York Central
Party	Candidate	Votes	%	±%
Labour Co-op	Rachael Maskell	20,212	42.4	+2.4
Conservative	Robert McIlveen	13,496	28.3	+2.2
UKIP	Ken Guest	4,795	10.1	+7.7
Green	Jonathan Tyler	4,791	10.0	+6.4
Liberal Democrats	Nick Love	3,804	8.0	−17.2
Yorkshire First	Chris Whitwood	291	0.6	N/A
TUSC	Megan Ollerhead	288	0.6	N/A
Majority		6,716	14.1	+0.2
Turnout		47,677	63.3	+1.2
Labour Co-op hold		Swing	+0.1	

General election 2010: York Central
Party	Candidate	Votes	%	±%
Labour	Hugh Bayley*	18,573	40.0	−8.9
Conservative	Susan Wade-Weeks	12,122	26.1	+3.2
Liberal Democrats	Christian Vassie	11,694	25.2	+5.0
Green	Andy Chase	1,669	3.6	−1.7
BNP	Jeff Kelly	1,171	2.5	N/A
UKIP	Paul Abbott	1,100	2.4	+0.3
Monster Raving Loony	Eddie Vee	154	0.3	N/A
Majority		6,451	13.9	−12.0
Turnout		46,483	62.1	+1.4
Labour hold		Swing	−6.0	

* Served as an MP in the 2005–2010 Parliament

== See also ==
- List of parliamentary constituencies in North Yorkshire
- List of parliamentary constituencies in the Yorkshire and the Humber (region)
