= Hugh Bayley =

British Labour Party politician

Sir Hugh Bayley
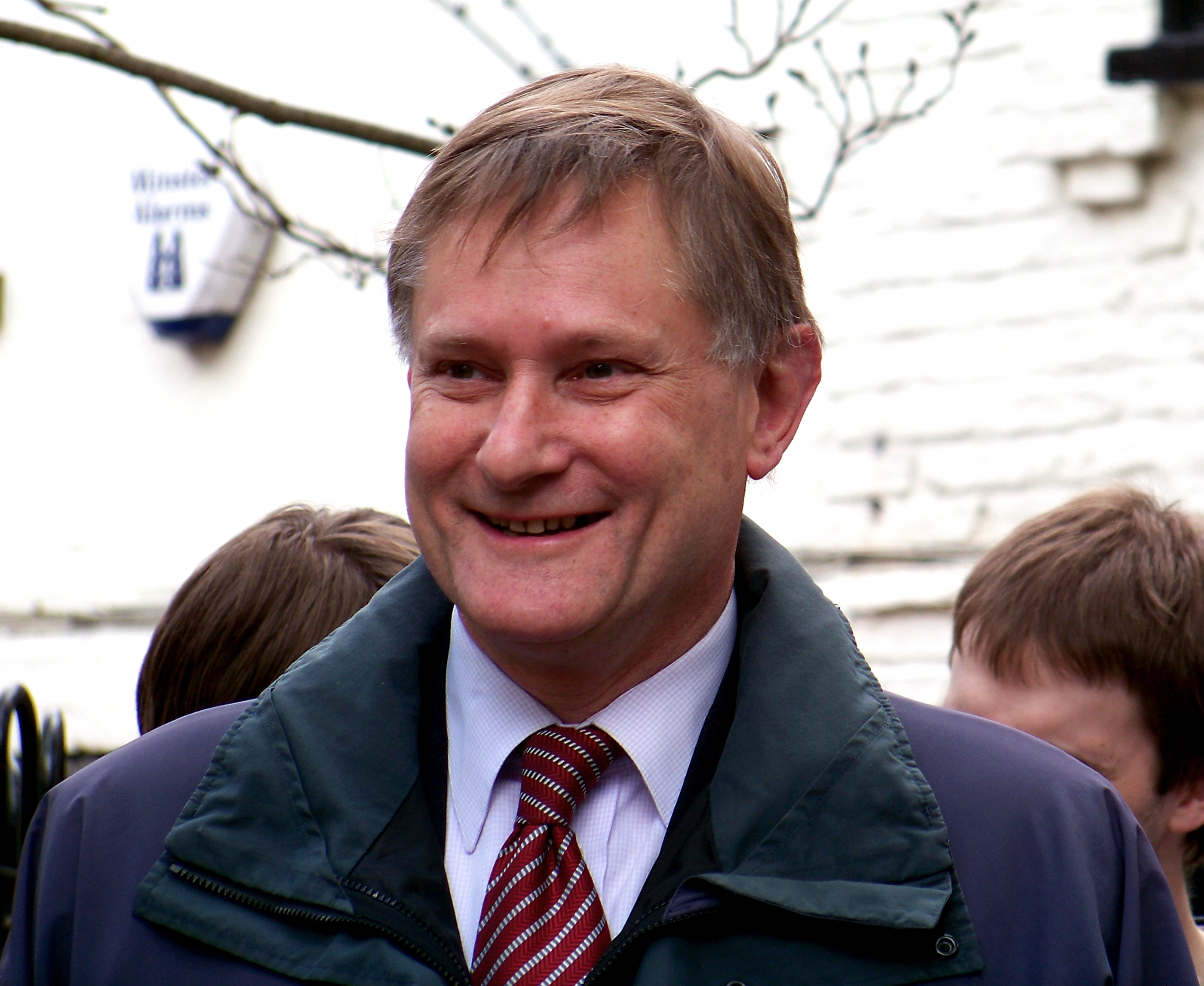
- Bayley in 2010

President of the NATO Parliamentary Assembly
- In office 1 November 2012 – 30 November 2014
- Preceded by: Karl A. Lamers
- Succeeded by: Mike Turner

Deputy Speaker of the House of Commons First Deputy Chair of Ways and Means
- Acting; 25 May 2010 – 8 June 2010
- Speaker: John Bercow
- Preceded by: Sylvia Heal
- Succeeded by: Nigel Evans

Parliamentary Under-Secretary of State for Social Security
- In office 4 January 1999 – 7 June 2001
- Prime Minister: Tony Blair
- Preceded by: Joan Ruddock
- Succeeded by: Malcolm Wicks

Member of Parliament for York Central City of York (1997–2010) York (1992–1997)
- In office 9 April 1992 – 7 May 2015
- Preceded by: Conal Gregory
- Succeeded by: Rachael Maskell

Personal details
- Born: Hugh Nigel Edward Bayley; 9 January 1952 (age 74) Maidenhead, Berkshire, England
- Party: Labour
- Spouse: Fenella Jeffers (m. 1984)
- Children: 2
- Education: University of Bristol; University of York

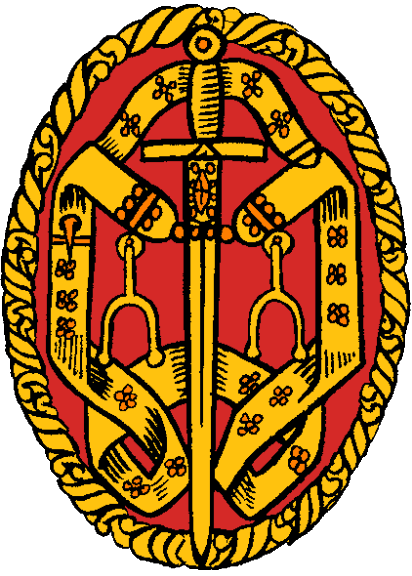
Insignia of a Knight Bachelor

Sir Hugh Nigel Edward Bayley (born 9 January 1952) is a British Labour Party politician who served as the Member of Parliament (MP) for York Central, previously York and City of York, from 1992 to 2015.

== Early life ==
Bayley was born in Maidenhead, Berkshire, and was educated at Haileybury and Imperial Service College, the University of Bristol, where he obtained a Politics BSc degree in 1974, before pursuing further studies at the University of York, where he was awarded a BPhil degree in Southern African studies in 1976. After his studies in 1975 he became a District Officer and later a National Officer with NALGO until 1982.

Bayley was elected as a councillor in the London Borough of Camden in 1980 and became the general secretary of the International Broadcasting Trust in 1982. Bayley stepped down as a councillor and moved to York to take up a post as research officer in health economics at the University of York from 1987 to 1992. He was a lecturer in social policy at the university from 1986 until 1998.

== Parliamentary career ==
Hugh Bayley was nominated as the Labour candidate for York at the 1987 general election but was defeated by just 147 votes by the Conservative Conal Gregory. After the election, Hugh Bayley became a Health Economics Research Fellow at the University of York, and became a member of the local health authority.

Conal Gregory and Hugh Bayley again fought it out at the 1992 general election in York and this time Bayley won by a comfortable margin. After his election he made his maiden speech on 7 May 1992 and joined the Health Select committee. The name of the York constituency was changed (though with unaltered boundaries) and Bayley won a majority of over 20,000 at the 1997 general election.

After the election, Bayley became the Parliamentary Private Secretary to the Secretary of State for Health Frank Dobson, who lived near York. In 1998 he was appointed to Tony Blair's Government as the Parliamentary Under Secretary of State in the Department of Social Security, responsible for Incapacity, Maternity, Disability benefits and Vaccine damage. He was deputed to bring the Welfare Reform and Pensions Bill through the Commons, which attracted much criticism from backbench Labour MPs over plans to means-test and restrict access to incapacity benefit. He was dropped from government after the 2001 general election.

Bayley has since served on the International Development Committee and pioneered the foundation of the Africa All-Party Parliamentary Group, serving as chair for several years, now being its vice-chair. He was president of the NATO Parliamentary Assembly from November 2012 to 2014. He was also a chairman of the Public Bill Committee. The City of York constituency was abolished in 2010, with Bayley being elected in the 2010 general election to represent the successor constituency York Central.

A loyal backbencher, Bayley rarely voted against his party whip.

At the outset of the 2010 parliament, Speaker of the House of Commons John Bercow appointed Bayley as a temporary Deputy Speaker to serve for two weeks until the election of Deputy Speakers. Bayley accepted the appointment, but stated that he would serve only temporarily and would not run for a Deputy Speakership, as he preferred to be able to represent his constituents by speaking out on issues before the House.

On 5 December 2014, Bayley announced his intention to stand down as a Labour MP at the 2015 general election.

Bayley was knighted in the 2015 New Year Honours for his "services to parliamentary engagement with NATO".

== Personal life ==
Sir Hugh was active in the Anti-Apartheid Movement in his student days.

On 22 December 1984, in Camden, he married Fenella Jeffers from Nevis; they have a son and a daughter.

Parliament of the United Kingdom
Preceded by Conal Gregory	Member of Parliament for the City of York; 1992–2010	Constituency abolished
New constituency	Member of Parliament for the York Central; 2010–2015	Succeeded by Rachael Maskell
