= Alex Lyon (politician) =

British politician

Member of Parliament for York
- In office 31 March 1966 – 13 May 1983
- Preceded by: Charles Longbottom
- Succeeded by: Conal Gregory

Personal details
- Born: Alexander Ward Lyon; 15 October 1931
- Died: 30 September 1993 (aged 61) Milton Keynes, Buckinghamshire, England
- Party: Labour
- Spouses: Hilda Arandall (m. 1951, divorced) Clare Short (m. 1981)

Alexander Ward Lyon (15 October 1931 – 30 September 1993) was a British Labour politician.

== Early life ==
Lyon was educated at West Leeds High School and University College London. He became a barrister, called to the Bar at Inner Temple in 1954. He was a member of the Bar Council and of the Fabian Society. He was also a Methodist local preacher and secretary of Leeds North West Constituency Labour Party.

== Political career ==
Lyon was elected Member of Parliament for the marginal City of York in 1966, having first fought the seat in 1964. He was Minister of State at the Home Office, March 1974 – April 1976, but, as a radical, was sacked by Jim Callaghan.

In 1971 Lyon introduced the United Reformed Church Bill, which became the act which created the United Reformed Church from a union of Presbyterian and Congregationalist churches in England and Wales. He also introduced an amendment to the Nullity of Marriage Act 1971.

In a debate on 4 August 1980 he became the first MP to use the phrase "chuntering from a sedentary position", later used by many MPs, and a catchphrase of former Speaker of the House of Commons John Bercow.

In 1981 he tried to amend a Finance Bill to allow those with a "conscientious objection to paying for expenditure on defence" to pay the military part of their taxes to the then Ministry of Overseas Development.

He was defeated in the 1983 General Election by the Conservative Conal Gregory.

== Personal life ==
In 1981, Lyon married Clare Short, a civil servant who he had worked with whilst at the Home Office. Short herself later became a Labour MP and cabinet minister, winning Birmingham Ladywood for the first time on the same day Lyon lost his seat.

In 1993, Clare Short was called away from the Labour party conference to say her husband was very ill and likely to die. In her book An Honourable Deception, she described how "after losing his parliamentary seat, he moved from being a senior Labour MP to running my constituency office where he gave me enormous support as well as bringing great experience to the task. Later he decided to return to the Bar, but after a time got himself into various difficulties and I began to suspect that either he was suffering a deep depression or mental deterioration. The next few years were very difficult as he engaged in strange, inexplicable behaviour. He gradually fell out with family and friends and stayed home with our St Bernard called Fred and would deal with no one but Fred and me."

He died in Milton Keynes from a long illness, on 30 September 1993, aged 61. He had two sons, and a daughter from his first marriage.

Parliament of the United Kingdom
Preceded by Charles Longbottom	Member of Parliament for York; 1966–1983	Succeeded by Conal Gregory
