= Hare and Billet =

Public house in London, England

The Hare and Billet, Blackheath
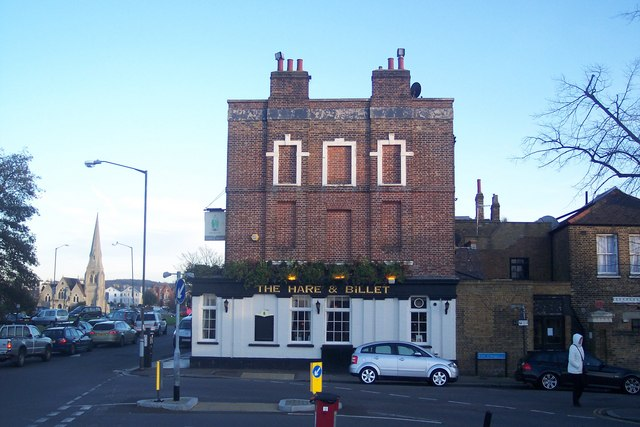
- The Hare & Billet, at the junction of Hare & Billet Road (on the left) and Eliot Cottages (on the right). All Saints Church is on the left in the background.

- Location within London Borough of Lewisham Location within Greater London

General information
- Location: Blackheath, London, England
- Coordinates: 51°28′04.80″N 0°0′13.32″E
- Landlord: Greene King (Note: Official website names owner as Capital Pub Company, a division of Greene King.)

Website
- www.hareandbillet.com

The Hare and Billet is a public house located in Blackheath, London, overlooking parts of Greenwich Park. In the 18th century, the Hare and Billet was a coaching inn. The pub received media coverage in 2014 after a south London MP made a speech in the House of Commons claiming a condiment they served was a "parasitic copy" of another brand of Worcester Sauce, leading to a backlash that was nicknamed "Hendogate". It is owned by the Metropolitan Pub Company.

== History ==
The Hare and Billet in 1780, painted by Thomas Luny

Watling Street, the Roman road to Dover, crossed the bleak and forbidding Blackheath and, in the 18th century, this stretch of the busy route was notorious for its highwaymen. At this time, the Hare and Billet was an isolated coaching inn on the heath. The establishment has been trading since the 1600s.

== Location ==
The pub is on Hare & Billet Road, and across that road lies Hare and Billet Pond, considered to have the most natural appearance and probably the best wildlife habitat of the four ponds on Blackheath. The road is said to be haunted by the ghost of an 18th century woman who hanged herself from an elm tree when her lover failed to meet her there.

The nearest railway station is Blackheath, approximately 0.25 miles away and the Lewisham DLR station is approximately 0.9 miles away. The A2 is 0.3 miles to the north of the pub.

== Hendogate ==
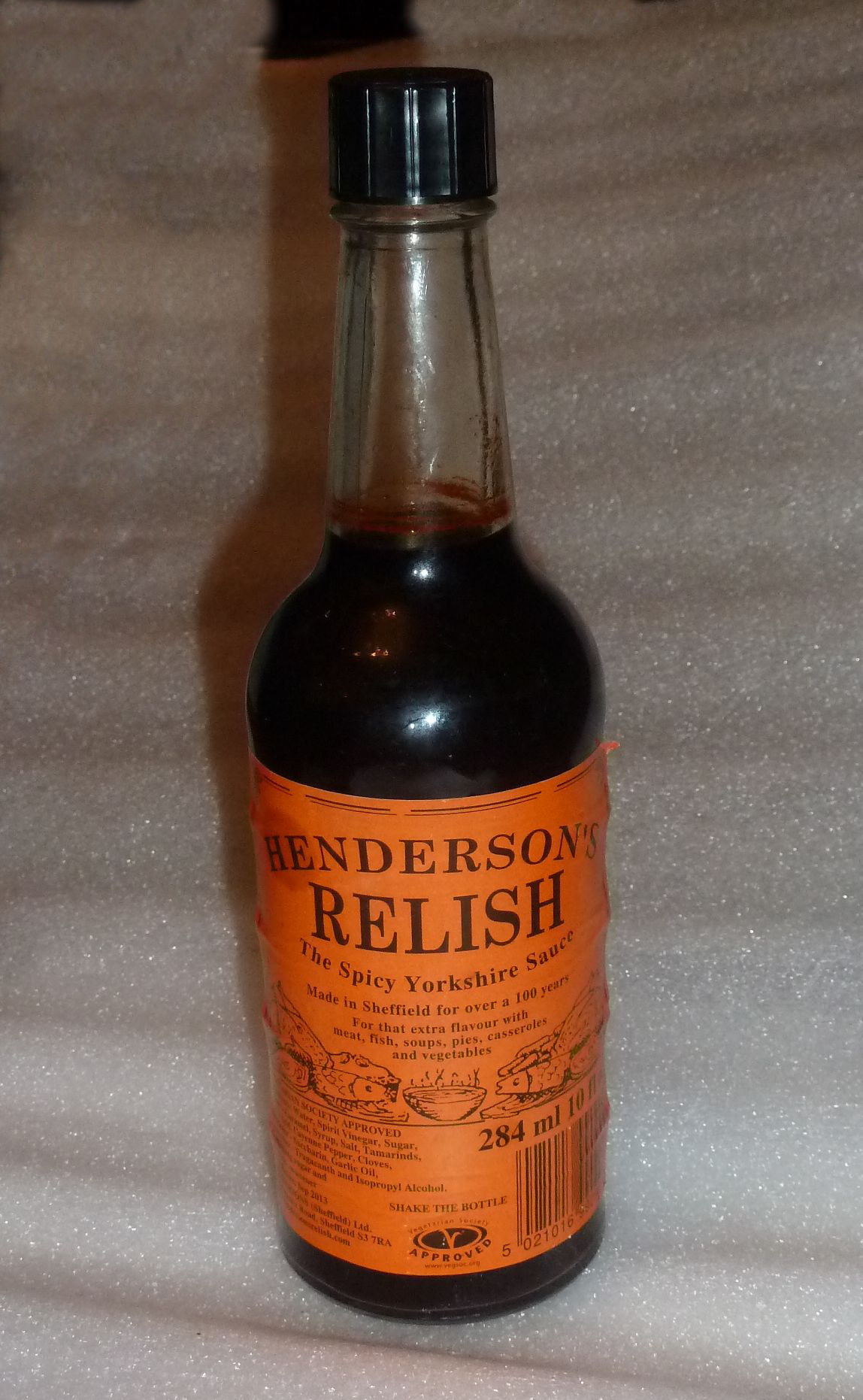
Henderson's Relish

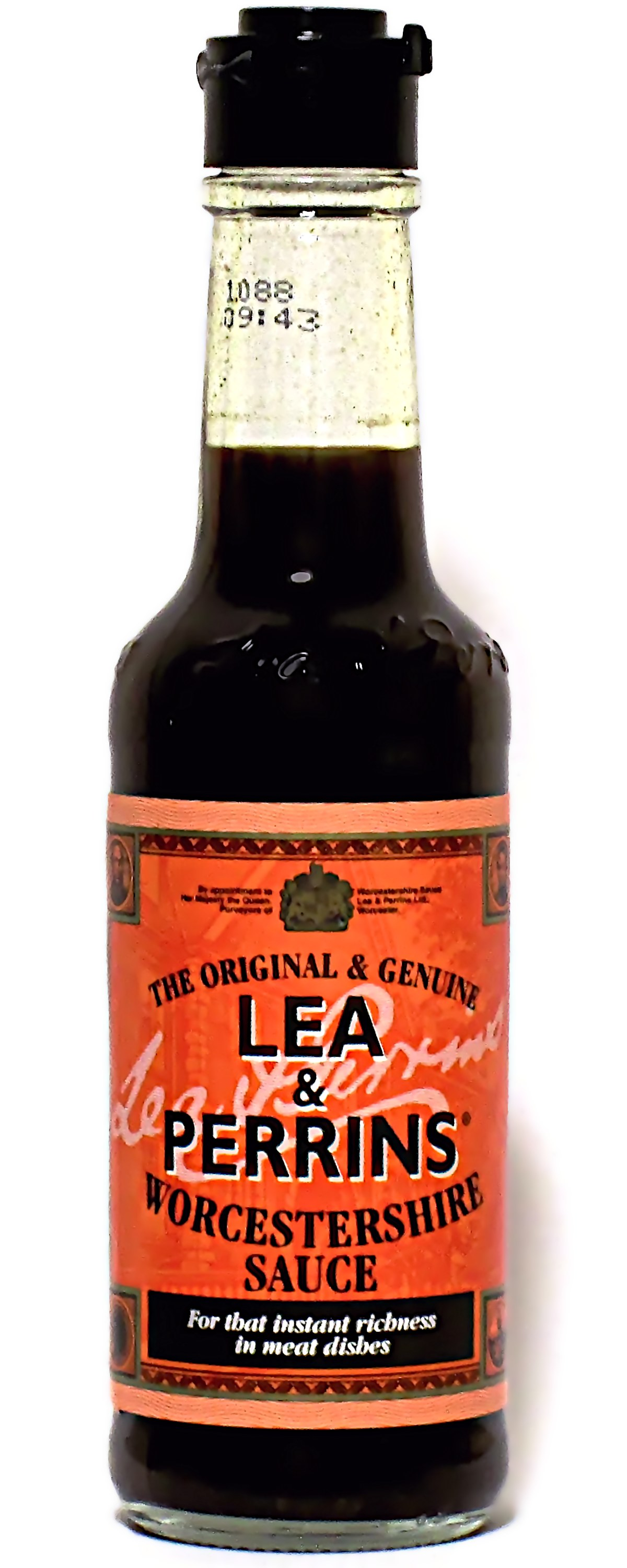
Lea & Perrins Worcestershire sauce

On 20 January 2014, the pub was mentioned by Jim Dowd, MP for Lewisham West and Penge, during a debate in the House of Commons on the Intellectual Property Bill. The Hare and Billet was where Dowd was served Henderson's Relish when he asked for some Worcester Sauce during a meal. As Dowd was unfamiliar with Henderson's Relish he later cited the product as an example of "parasitic copying", namely of the anchovy-based condiment sold under the Lea & Perrins name. Due to the cult following enjoyed by Henderson's in Sheffield and South Yorkshire, Dowd faced a backlash in the media, which included an open letter rebuttal from the Deputy Prime Minister Nick Clegg and Dowd's Labour Party colleague Paul Blomfield, MP for Sheffield Central. The pub noted that a number of Sheffielders living in London had visited the pub as a result of the media coverage that was generated.

== See also ==
- Greene King Brewery
- Greenwich Park
- List of pubs in the United Kingdom
