= Sakina Sheikh =

British politician

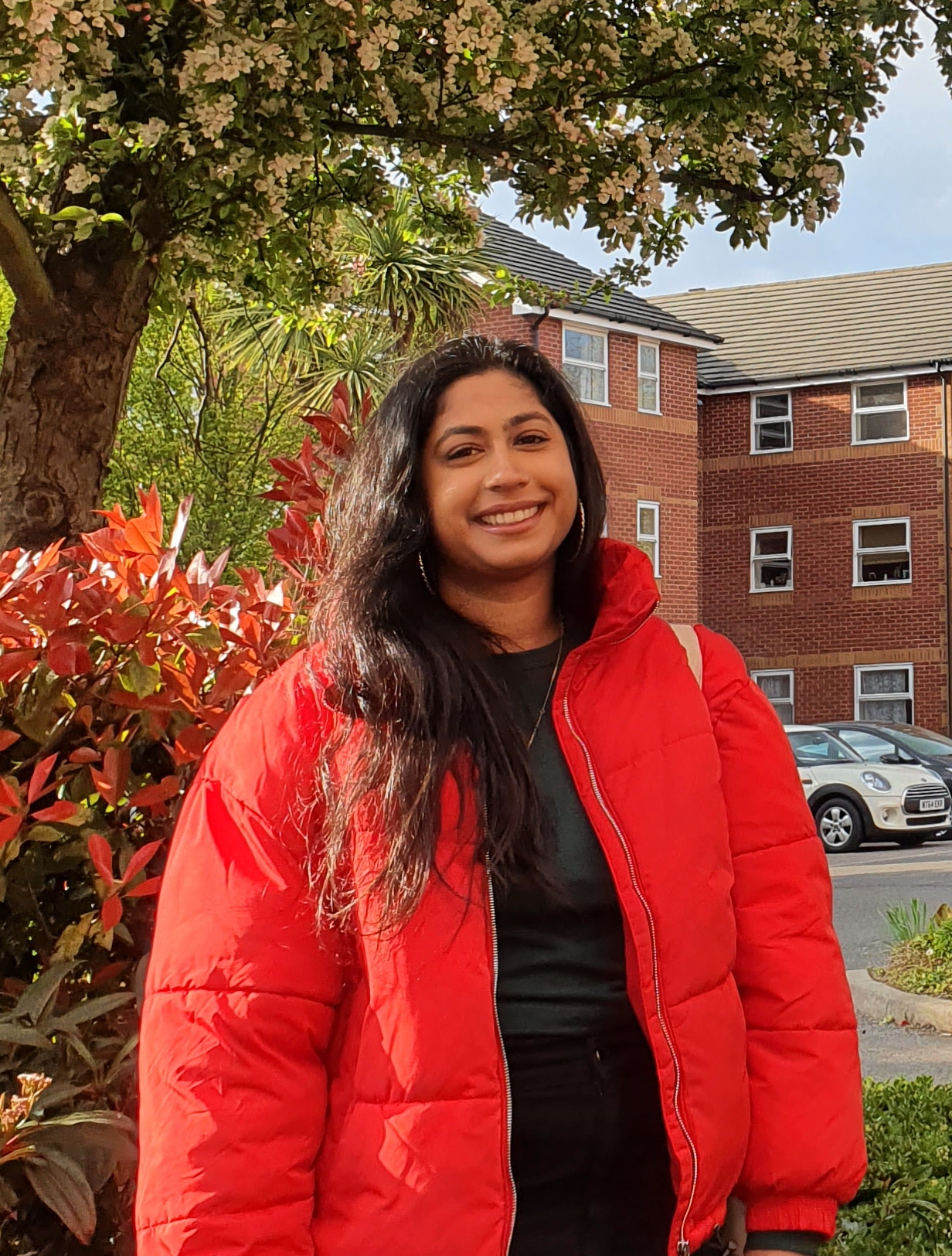
- Sheikh campaigning in 2021

Member of the London Assembly as an additional member
- In office 8 May 2021 – 4 May 2024

Personal details
- Born: Sakina Zahra Sheikh; 1990 (age 35–36) London, England
- Party: Labour and Co-op
- Website: www.sakinasheikh.co.uk

Sakina Zahra Sheikh (born 1990) is a British Labour Party politician who was a Member of the London Assembly (AM) as an additional member from 2021 to 2024. She also represented Perry Vale on Lewisham Council until she lost her seat in the 2026 election.

== Early life and education ==
Sheikh studied law with an emphasis on Human Rights.

== Political career ==
Sheikh was first elected to Lewisham Council in 2018 as a councillor for the Perry Vale ward. She was re-elected in 2022 before losing her seat in 2026.

In 2020, she ran for selection as a Labour candidate in the London Assembly list, which covers the entire city. Her campaign emphasised social housing, acting on the climate crisis, and equalities. She won second place on Labour's list of list candidates, and was elected as the second of Labour's two additional Assembly Members in the 2021 London election.

Since her election, she continued to focus on the climate and is chair of the 2022-2023 Planning and Regeneration committee.

Sheikh lost her seat in the 2024 London Assembly election and lost her seat in the 2026 Lewisham London Borough Council election.
