= Jim Dowd =

Jim Dowd is the name of:

- Jim Dowd (politician) (born 1951), Member of Parliament for Lewisham West and Penge
- Jim Dowd (ice hockey) (born 1968), ice hockey player
