= Lewisham West and East Dulwich =

UK Parliament constituency (since 2024)

- Borough constituency for the House of Commons
- Interactive map of boundaries from 2024
- Location within Greater London
- County: Greater London
- Electorate: 69,904 (March 2020)
- Major settlements: Lewisham, East Dulwich, Sydenham

Current constituency
- Created: 2024
- Member of Parliament: Ellie Reeves (Labour)
- Seats: One
- Created from: Lewisham West and Penge, Lewisham Deptford & Camberwell and Peckham

Lewisham West and East Dulwich is a constituency (Note: A borough constituency (for the purposes of election expenses and type of returning officer)) of the House of Commons in the Parliament of the United Kingdom. Following its creation by the 2023 periodic review of Westminster constituencies, it was first contested in the 2024 general election. It is currently represented by Ellie Reeves of the Labour Party, (Note: As with all constituencies, the constituency elects one Member of Parliament (MP) by the first past the post system of election at least every five years) who has served as Attorney General for England and Wales and Advocate General for Northern Ireland since July 2026. Reeves was MP for the predecessor constituency of Lewisham West and Penge from 2017 to 2024.

== Constituency profile ==
Lewisham West and East Dulwich is a mostly suburban constituency in the boroughs of Lewisham and Southwark in Greater London, located around 5 miles (8.0 km) south-east of the centre of London. It covers the neighbourhoods of Honor Oak, Forest Hill, East Dulwich and part of Sydenham. Like much of suburban London, this area was rapidly developed with upper-middle class housing in the late 19th and early 20th centuries. The area is not served by the London Underground but is connected to the rest of London by Overground and National Rail services. The constituency has low levels of deprivation, with the northern parts being more affluent. House prices are similar to the London average and considerably higher than the rest of the country.

In general, residents of Lewisham West and East Dulwich are young, well-educated and have high rates of household income and professional employment. A high proportion of residents work in education, accommodation and food services. The percentage of residents claiming unemployment benefits is higher than the nationwide figure, however the child poverty rate is very low. White people made up 62% of the population at the 2021 census, which includes a significant Irish community. Black people were the largest ethnic minority group at 20%, including large Jamaican and Nigerian populations. At the local borough council level, all seats in the constituency are represented by Labour Party councillors. Voters overwhelmingly supported remaining in the European Union in the 2016 referendum; an estimated 76% voted to remain compared to 48% nationwide, making it one of the top-20 most remain-supporting constituencies out of 650 across the United Kingdom according to Electoral Calculus.

== Boundaries ==
The constituency is composed of the following electoral wards:

- The London Borough of Lewisham wards of Crofton Park, Forest Hill, Perry Vale, and Sydenham.
- The London Borough of Southwark wards of Dulwich Hill, Goose Green, and Peckham Rye.

It comprises the following districts:

- Forest Hill, Perry Vale and Sydenham, transferred from the abolished constituency of Lewisham West and Penge
- Crofton Park, transferred from Lewisham Deptford (renamed Lewisham North)
- East Dulwich (Dulwich Hill and Goose Green wards) and Nunhead (Peckham Rye ward), transferred partly from Dulwich and West Norwood and partly from Camberwell and Peckham (renamed Peckham)

== Election results ==
=== Elections in the 2020s ===
General election 2024: Lewisham West and East Dulwich
Party	Candidate	Votes	%	±%
Labour	Ellie Reeves	27,406	59.1	–7.1
Green	Callum Fowler	9,009	19.4	+12.1
Liberal Democrats	Josh Matthews	3,558	7.7	–2.2
Conservative	Christine Wallace	3,477	7.5	–7.0
Reform	Marian Newton	2,234	4.8	+3.0
Workers Party	Gwenton Sloley	427	0.9	N/A
CPA	Katherine Hortense	303	0.7	+0.2
Majority		18,397	39.7	–11.8
Turnout		46,414	66.2	+0.1
Registered electors		70,099		
Labour hold		Swing	▼9.6	

=== Elections in the 2010s ===
2019 notional result
Party	Vote	%
Labour	30,534	66.1
Conservative	6,711	14.5
Liberal Democrats	4,568	9.9
Green	3,368	7.3
Brexit Party	832	1.8
Others	213	0.5
Turnout	46,226	66.1
Electorate	69,904	
