= Henderson's Relish =

English condiment sauce

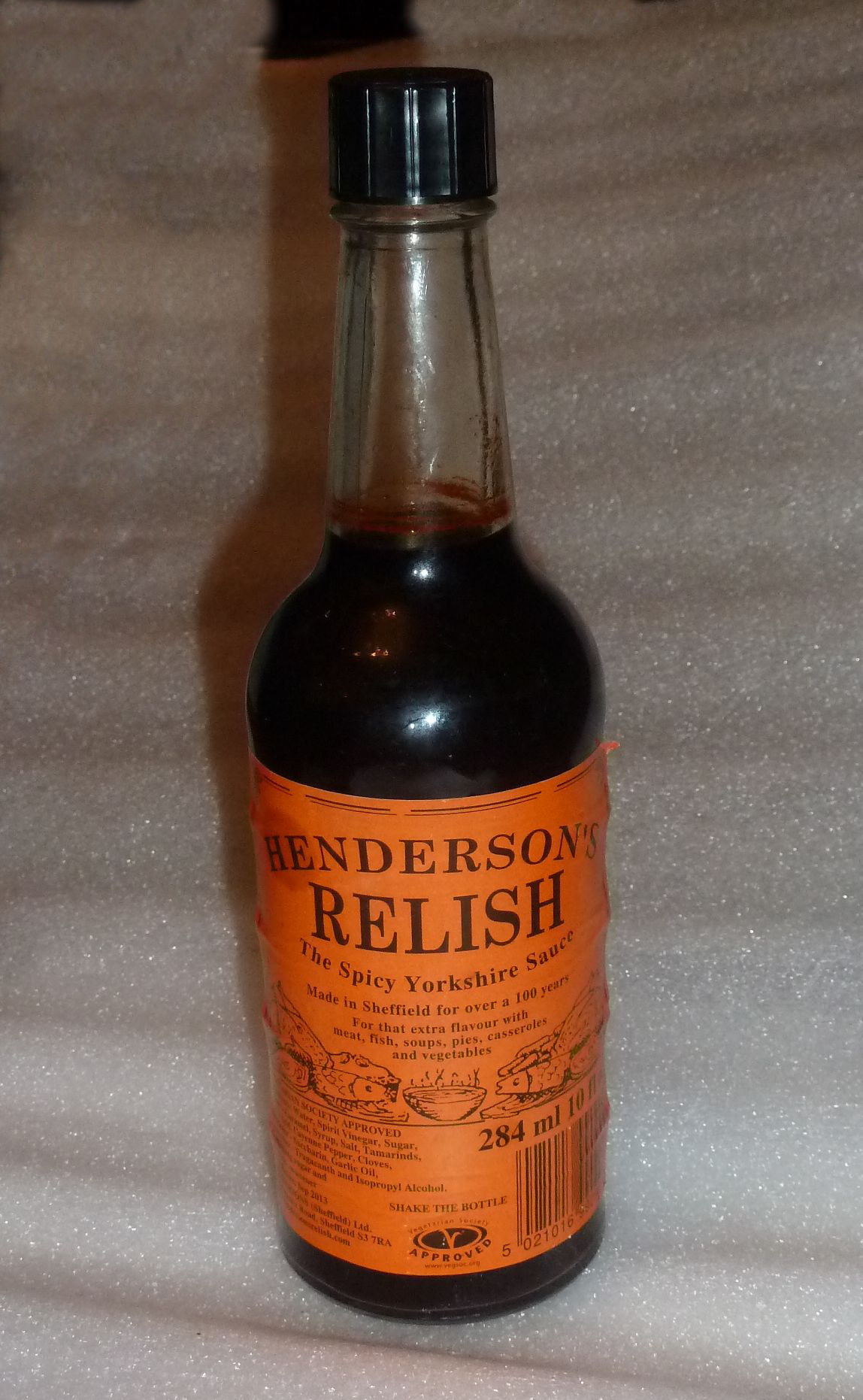
A bottle of Henderson's Relish

Henderson's Relish is a condiment sauce produced in Sheffield in South Yorkshire, England. It is similar in appearance and flavour to Worcestershire sauce, but unlike many Worcestershire sauces contains no anchovies. It is made of water, sugar and spirit vinegar with tamarind, cloves and cayenne pepper.

== History ==
Henry Henderson, who had trained as a miller and then as a druggist, began manufacturing sauce in 1885. Originally manufactured at 35 Broad Lane in Sheffield, Henderson's Relish is still being made and was in uninterrupted production within half a mile of the site from which the first bottle was filled, until the move to a new factory in 2013. In 1910, the company was bought by Shaws of Huddersfield, who still supply Hendersons with vinegar. In 1940, general manager Charles Hinksman purchased the company from Shaws and formed Hendersons (Sheffield) Ltd., the control of which remained with his family, as of 2016 the Freemans.

== Description and ingredients ==
Henderson's has a base of spirit vinegar, coloured with caramel and sweetened with sugar and saccharin. Its flavour is derived from garlic, tamarind, (Note: Tamarind is also a major flavour note in another popular English sauce, HP Sauce.) and cayenne pepper. Ava Szajna-Hopgood, writing for Vice, described the sauce as a "murky brown" with a umami flavour that's "hard...to pinpoint" but "kind of just makes you want to eat more".

== Popularity ==
The sauce is often compared to the more well-known Worcestershire sauce, but local fans have long argued Henderson's Relish is dissimilar to Worcestershire sauce.

Henderson's has historically not been well-known outside Yorkshire; in February 2014, Lewisham MP Jim Dowd, after having been served it in the Hare and Billet in Blackheath, assumed it a knockoff of the anchovy-based Lea and Perrins and described its packaging as a "parasitic" attempt to pass off one sauce as another during a parliamentary debate on the Intellectual Property Bill. He was corrected by comments from Sheffield MPs Paul Blomfield and Nick Clegg. Dowd later toured the Henderson's factory.

In 2024 Henderson's removed the tag line "Strong and Northern" from packaging intended for export, replacing it with "Worcestershire", which Somerset Live called "a contentious label" that was shocking to local fans of the sauce, who had long argued Henderson's was a completely different condiment. Henderson's explained the label was to make the product less confusing to overseas customers unfamiliar with it.

It is widely known in Sheffield as "Hendo's". Tom Wrigglesworth joked that while those more familiar with Worcestershire sauce assume Henderson's is Sheffield's answer to Worcestershire sauce, its fans consider it "the answer to everything". According to Atlas Obscura, the sauce has a cult following.

== Factory ==
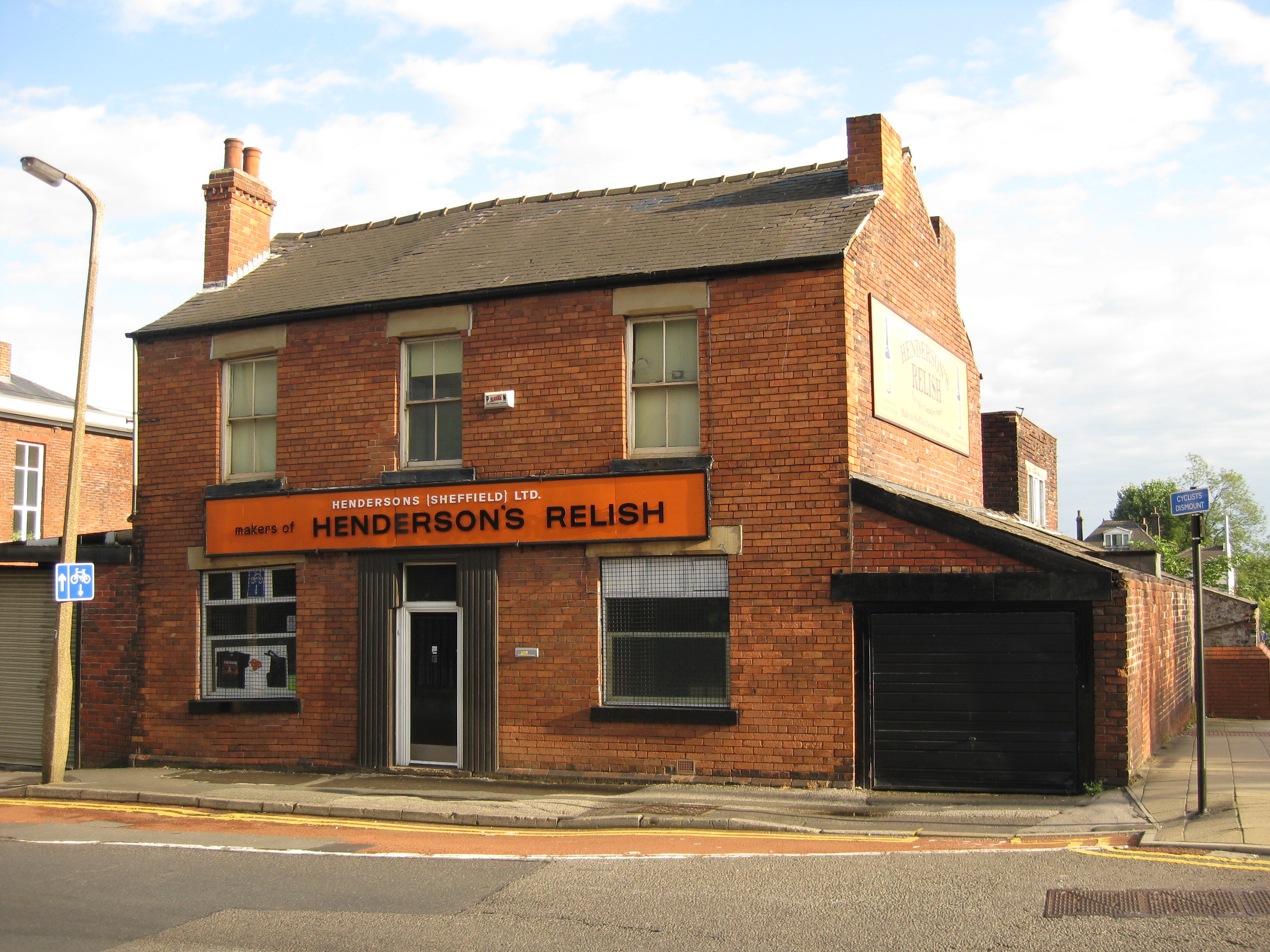
Henderson's (Sheffield) Ltd.

After starting in Sheffield over one hundred years ago, until 2013 the relish was in uninterrupted production within half a mile of the original site on Broad Lane from which the first bottle was filled. The Henderson's factory was located opposite what was once the Jessop Hospital for Women, now the Music Department of the University of Sheffield. The building is adjacent to the University of Sheffield Supertram stop, on Leavygreave Road. In September 2008, the sign that had adorned the side of the historic Henderson's Relish building was stolen, and shortly afterwards was placed for sale on a local Sheffield blog.

In 2013, the manufacturer moved to Sheffield Parkway Business Park.

The University of Sheffield spent £1.8 million to restore the building for use as a public space. In 2024, the University began to sell the original roof tiles from the building to raise money to support students seeking sanctuary in Sheffield, including those displaced by the Russian invasion of Ukraine.

== See also ==
- Lea & Perrins
- Steak sauce
- A.1. Sauce
