= Ellie Reeves =

British politician (born 1980)

The Right Honourable Ellie Reeves KC MP
- Official portrait, 2026

Attorney General for England and Wales Advocate General for Northern Ireland
- Incumbent
- Assumed office 20 July 2026
- Prime Minister: Andy Burnham
- Preceded by: The Lord Hermer

Solicitor General for England and Wales
- In office 6 September 2025 – 20 July 2026
- Prime Minister: Keir Starmer
- Preceded by: Lucy Rigby
- Succeeded by: Andy Slaughter

Chair of the Labour Party
- In office 6 July 2024 – 6 September 2025
- Leader: Keir Starmer
- Preceded by: Anneliese Dodds
- Succeeded by: Anna Turley

Minister without Portfolio
- In office 6 July 2024 – 6 September 2025
- Prime Minister: Keir Starmer
- Preceded by: Richard Holden
- Succeeded by: Anna Turley
Shadow portfolios
Shadow Minister for Prisons and Probation
In office 4 December 2021 – 4 September 2023
Leader	Keir Starmer
Preceded by	Lyn Brown
Succeeded by	Ruth Cadbury
Shadow Solicitor General for England and Wales
In office 9 April 2020 – 4 December 2021
Leader	Keir Starmer
Preceded by	Nick Thomas-Symonds
Succeeded by	Andy Slaughter

Member of Parliament for Lewisham West and East Dulwich Lewisham West and Penge (2017–2024)
- Incumbent
- Assumed office 8 June 2017
- Preceded by: Jim Dowd
- Majority: 18,397 (39.7%)

Personal details
- Born: Eleanor Claire Reeves; 11 December 1980 (age 45) Lewisham, London, England
- Party: Labour
- Spouse: John Cryer, Baron Cryer (m. 2012)
- Children: 2
- Relatives: Rachel Reeves (sister)
- Education: St Catherine's College, Oxford (BA)
- Website: Official website

Eleanor Claire Reeves (born 11 December 1980) is a British barrister and politician who has served as Attorney General for England and Wales and Advocate General for Northern Ireland since July 2026. She previously served as Solicitor General for England and Wales from September 2025 to July 2026. A member of the Labour Party, she has served as the Member of Parliament for Lewisham West and East Dulwich, formerly Lewisham West and Penge, since 2017. She is the younger sister of former Chancellor of the Exchequer Rachel Reeves.

Reeves previously served as Shadow Solicitor General from April 2020 to December 2021, Shadow Minister for Prisons and Probation from 2021 to 2023, and as both Minister without Portfolio and as the Chair of the Labour Party from July 2024 until September 2025.

== Early life ==
Eleanor Reeves was born on 11 December 1980 in Lewisham, the daughter of teachers Graham and Sally Reeves. Her older sister, Rachel, is the Labour MP for Leeds West and Pudsey and was the Chancellor of the Exchequer under then Prime Minister Keir Starmer.

Reeves grew up in Sydenham and was educated at Adamsrill Primary School and Cator Park Secondary School. She then studied law at St Catherine's College, Oxford, graduating with a bachelor's degree.

== Political career ==
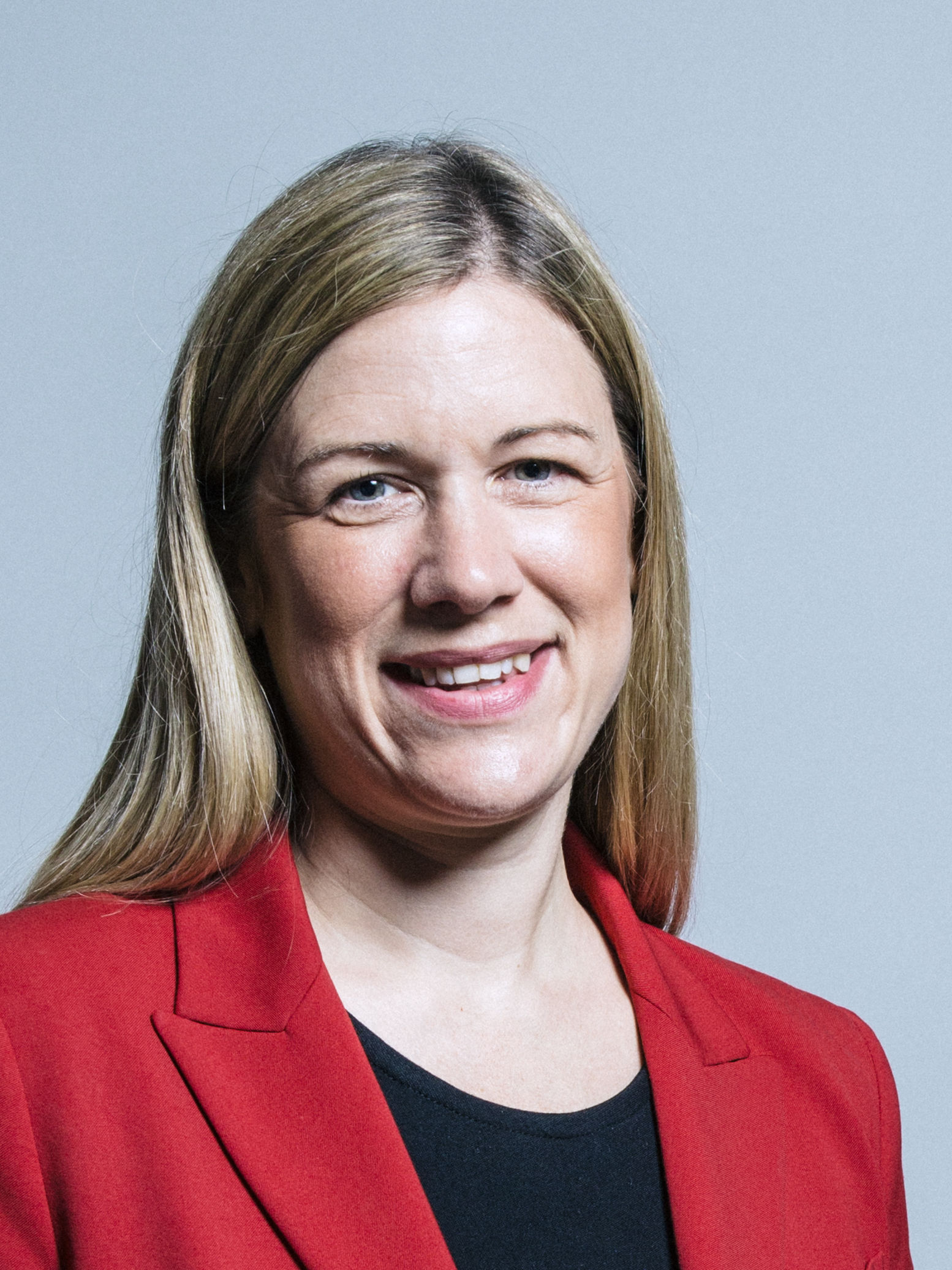
Official portrait, 2017

Reeves joined the Labour Party at 15, chaired the Oxford University Labour Club in 2001 and was National Chair of Labour Students from 2002 to 2003.

In 2006, she was first elected as a constituency party representative on Labour's National Executive Committee (NEC), supported by Progress and Labour First. Reeves was returned to the governing body in subsequent elections, and served as Vice-Chair from 2015 to 2016, until she was defeated by Momentum in 2016. She later served as vice-chair of the London Labour Party.

== Parliamentary career ==
Reeves was selected as the Labour candidate for Lewisham West and Penge in April 2017, chosen over a left-wing Momentum activist.

At the snap 2017 general election, Reeves was elected to Parliament as MP for Lewisham West and Penge, with 66.6% of the vote and a majority of 23,162.

Reeves was appointed to the opposition front bench as Parliamentary Private Secretary to Kate Osamor, Shadow International Development Secretary, in March 2018. On 13 June 2018, Reeves and five other MPs resigned as frontbenchers to vote in favour of remaining in the single market, defying the party whip.

After signing a letter criticising the decision to re-admit Chris Williamson into Labour, Reeves was threatened with deselection by a party member in July 2019. Following backlash, Party Leader Jeremy Corbyn wrote that pregnant MPs would not face deselection and the member withdrew their plans to challenge her.

At the 2019 general election, Reeves was re-elected as MP for Lewisham West and Penge with a decreased vote share of 61.2% and a decreased majority of 21,543.

On 9 April 2020, Reeves was re-appointed to the opposition front bench as Shadow Solicitor General for England and Wales.

She served as Labour's political lead for the 2021 Old Bexley and Sidcup by-election, in which there was a 7.4% increase in the party's vote share and 10.2% swing from the Conservatives to Labour, however the Conservatives held the seat with a 20.6% majority.

In the 2023 British shadow cabinet reshuffle she joined the Shadow Cabinet as Labour Party Deputy National Campaign Coordinator.

Due to the 2023 Periodic Review of Westminster constituencies, Reeves' constituency of Lewisham West and Penge was abolished, and replaced with Lewisham West and East Dulwich. At the 2024 general election, Reeves was elected to Parliament as MP for Lewisham West and East Dulwich with 59.1% of the vote and a majority of 18,397.

In July 2024, Reeves was appointed as Chair of the Labour Party and Minister without Portfolio with attendance at Cabinet.

On 2 April 2025, Reeves was appointed a Privy Counsellor. She left the cabinet at the 2025 British cabinet reshuffle.

On 27 January 2026, Reeves was appointed a King's Counsel.

== Political positions ==
Reeves is a Labour MP, and on the vast majority of issues follows instructions from her party and votes the same way as other Labour MPs.

Reeves is a supporter of Labour Friends of Israel.

== Personal life ==
Reeves is married to Lord Cryer, who was a Labour MP from 1997 to 2005 and from 2010 to 2024.

== Notes ==
Parliament of the United Kingdom
Preceded by Jim Dowd	Member of Parliament for Lewisham West and Penge; 2017–2024	Constituency abolished
New constituency	Member of Parliament for Lewisham West and East Dulwich; 2024–present	Incumbent
Political offices
Preceded by Nick Thomas-Symonds	Shadow Solicitor General for England and Wales; 2020–2021	Succeeded by Andy Slaughter
Preceded by Esther McVey	Minister without Portfolio; 2024–present	Incumbent
Party political offices
Preceded by Anneliese Dodds	Chair of the Labour Party; 2024–present	Incumbent
