= Lewisham West and Penge =

UK Parliament constituency (2010–2024)

Coordinates: 51.43°N 0.05°W

- Former borough constituency for the House of Commons
- Boundary of Lewisham West and Penge in Greater London
- County: Greater London
- Electorate: 69,399 (December 2010)
- Major settlements: Forest Hill, Penge and Sydenham

2010–2024
- Seats: One
- Created from: Lewisham West; Beckenham
- Replaced by: Beckenham and Penge; Lewisham East; Lewisham West and East Dulwich

Lewisham West and Penge was a constituency in Greater London created in 2010 and represented in the House of Commons of the UK Parliament. (Note: As with all constituencies, the constituency elects one Member of Parliament (MP) by the first past the post system of election at least every five years.)

The seat was abolished for the 2024 general election and replaced by parts of three other constituencies.

== Constituency profile ==
The seat comprised the south-western portion of Lewisham borough with the northwestern tip of Bromley borough. At the heart of the seat was Sydenham, with most of Forest Hill in the north. Its ambit also includes some of the Crystal Palace and Sydenham Hill (the park and site of the palace itself is on the intersection of five boroughs) and the nearby areas of Anerley and Penge. The parts of Beckenham around Clock House and Kent House railway stations are also included. The Guardian summarised it in 2010 as "suburban south-east London, with a large Afro-Caribbean population."

== Boundaries ==
Map of boundaries 2010–2024

The seat covers the following electoral wards: Bellingham; Forest Hill; Perry Vale; Sydenham (London Borough of Lewisham) and Clock House; Crystal Palace; Penge & Cator (London Borough of Bromley).

To create the new constituency the Boundary Commission for England transferred Perry Vale ward, Bellingham ward, Forest Hill ward, and Sydenham ward from the former Lewisham West constituency. Clock House ward, Crystal Palace ward, and Penge and Cator ward were transferred from Beckenham constituency.

== History ==
Following the adoption of the Boundary Commission's Fifth Periodic Review of Westminster constituencies, this constituency was created for the 2010 general election with electoral wards from the London Boroughs of Bromley and Lewisham. The greater electorate and area of the constituency is in the London Borough of Lewisham.

Political history

At the 2010 general election, the Liberal Democrat challenge edged the Conservative candidate narrowly into third. The 2015 Liberal Democrat candidate moved into fifth position on results night.

Labour held the seat in the 2019 general election, with a reduced share of the vote 31,860. The Conservatives came second, and the Liberal Democrats achieved third place.

=== Abolition ===
Further to the completion of the 2023 review of Westminster constituencies, the seat was abolished for the 2024 general election, with its contents distributed three ways:

- "Penge", comprising the Borough of Bromley wards of Clock House, Crystal Palace, and Penge and Cator, was included in the new constituency of Beckenham and Penge
- The Borough of Lewisham wards of Forest Hill, Perry Vale and Sydenham were included in the new constituency of Lewisham West and East Dulwich
- The Borough of Lewisham ward of Bellingham was transferred to Lewisham East

== Members of Parliament ==
Election	Member	Party	Notes
2010	Jim Dowd	Labour	Member for main predecessor seat (1992–2010)
2017	Ellie Reeves	Labour	Contested Lewisham West and East Dulwich following redistribution
2024	constituency abolished: see Lewisham West and East Dulwich and Beckenham and Penge		

== Election results ==
=== Elections in the 2010s ===
General election 2019: Lewisham West and Penge
Party	Candidate	Votes	%	±%
Labour	Ellie Reeves	31,860	61.2	–5.4
Conservative	Aisha Cuthbert	10,317	19.8	–3.2
Liberal Democrats	Alex Feakes	6,260	12.0	+5.8
Green	James Braun	2,390	4.6	+2.4
Brexit Party	Teixeira Hambro	1,060	2.0	New
CPA	Katherine Hortense	213	0.4	–0.2
Majority		21,543	41.3	–2.2
Turnout		52,100	69.8	–3.1
Registered electors		74,615		
Labour hold		Swing	–1.1	

General election 2017: Lewisham West & Penge
Party	Candidate	Votes	%	±%
Labour	Ellie Reeves	35,411	66.6	+16.0
Conservative	Shaun Bailey	12,249	23.0	–1.1
Liberal Democrats	Earl Russell	3,317	6.2	–1.5
Green	Karen Wheller	1,144	2.2	–6.3
UKIP	Hoong-Wai Cheah	700	1.3	–6.5
CPA	Katherine Hortense	325	0.6	New
Populist Party	Russell White	50	0.1	New
Majority		23,162	43.6	+17.1
Turnout		53,196	73.0	+6.3
Registered electors		72,899		
Labour hold		Swing	+8.6	

General election 2015: Lewisham West and Penge
Party	Candidate	Votes	%	±%
Labour	Jim Dowd	24,347	50.5	+9.4
Conservative	Russell Jackson	11,633	24.2	–1.4
Green	Tom Chance	4,077	8.5	+6.4
UKIP	Gary Harding	3,764	7.8	+5.3
Liberal Democrats	Alex Feakes	3,709	7.7	−20.4
TUSC	Martin Powell-Davies	391	0.8	New
Independent	David Hansom	160	0.3	New
Liberty GB	George Whale	84	0.2	New
Majority		12,714	26.4	+13.5
Turnout		48,165	66.6	+2.0
Registered electors		72,290		
Labour hold		Swing	+5.4	

General election 2010: Lewisham West and Penge
Party	Candidate	Votes	%	±%
Labour	Jim Dowd (Note: Served as MP for Lewisham West in the 2005–2010 Parliament)	18,501	41.1	–3.6
Liberal Democrats	Alex Feakes	12,673	28.1	+0.3
Conservative	Chris Phillips	11,489	25.5	+3.4
UKIP	Peter Staveley	1,117	2.5	
Green	Romayne Phoenix	931	2.1	
CPA	Stephen Hammond	317	0.7	
Majority		5,828	13.0	–3.9
Turnout		45,028	65.2	+5.8
Registered electors		69,022		
Labour hold		Swing	–1.9	

2005 notional result
Party	Vote	%
Labour	18,490	44.7
Liberal Democrats	11,528	27.9
Conservative	9,144	22.1
Others	2,227	5.4
Turnout	41,389	59.4
Electorate	69,632	

== See also ==
- Lewisham West (UK Parliament constituency)
- Parliamentary constituencies in London
