= Demographics of Sheffield =

- Population pyramid of Sheffield
- Population: 584,853 (2019)

Population density in the 2011 census in Sheffield

The latest (2024) population estimate for the City of Sheffield is 582,493 residents. This represents an increase of about 17,000 people since the last census in 2011.

In the 21st century the city has undergone a population growth above that of the national average, and is projected to increase to over 600,000 by 2020. This can largely be attributed to immigration and relatively high birth rates.

== Population ==
People from Sheffield (or 'Sheffielders') are colloquially known to residents of the surrounding towns of Barnsley, Doncaster, Rotherham and Chesterfield as "dee-dars", which derives from the traditional pronunciation of the "th" in the dialectal words "thee" and "thou", still used, especially by older people, in South Yorkshire. Many Yorkshire dialect words and aspects of pronunciation derive from old Norse due to the Viking influence in this region.

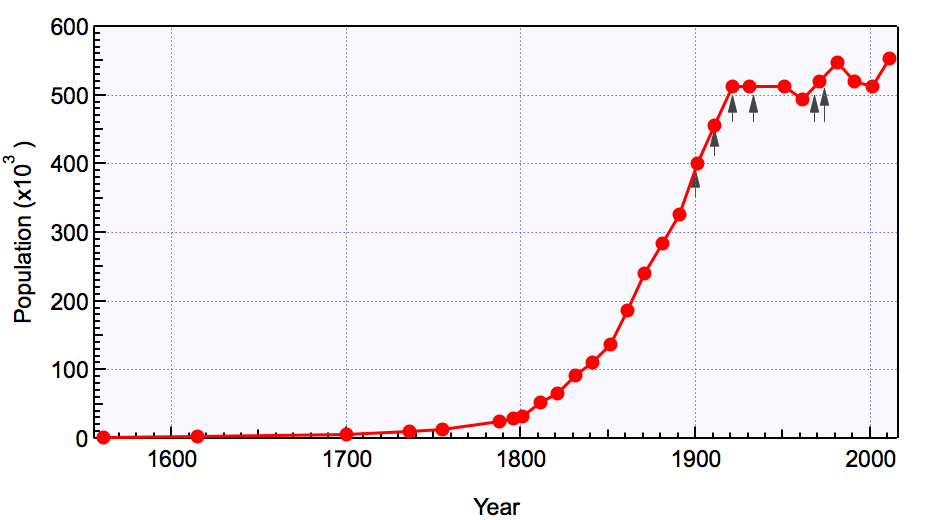
The population of Sheffield from 1700 through to 2011.

As with many British cities, the major period of growth in Sheffield's population occurred during the Industrial Revolution, when the city attracted large numbers of people looking for work in the local industries (particularly the cutlery and steel industries). In 1801 the population of the Parish of Sheffield was 45,755, by 1891 the population of the soon-to-be City of Sheffield (which covered the same area) was 325,547. Through most of the 20th century, despite the decline in manufacturing jobs from the 1970s onwards, the population remained relatively stable at about 515,000. This was due in part to the efforts made by the city to bring in white collar jobs.

== Ethnicity ==
Ethnic makeup of Sheffield by single year ages in 2021

Industry sectors of Sheffield over time

The following table shows the ethnic group of respondents in the 2001 and 2011 censuses in Sheffield.

A Home Office report officially estimated that the 'coloured' population of Sheffield in 1958 was likely around 3,500 to 5,000, the overwhelming amount of these being Afro-Caribbeans (3,000).

Ethnic Group	1971 estimations		1981 estimations		1991		2001		2011		2021	
Ethnic Group	Number	%	Number	%	Number	%	Number	%	Number	%	Number	%
White: Total	509,449	98%	508,795	96.8%	475,977	94.96%	468,217	91.23%	462,544	83.69%	440,216	79.1%
White: British	–	–	–	–	–	–	457,728	89.19%	446,837	80.85%	414,698	74.5%
White: Irish	–	–	–	–	3,437	–	3,337	0.65%	2,891	0.52%	2,750	0.5%
White: Gypsy or Irish Traveller (Note: New category created for the 2011 census)	–	–	–	–	–	–	–	–	358	0.06%	341	0.1%
White: Roma	–	–	–	–	–	–	–	–	–	–	2,456	0.4%
White: Other	–	–	–	–	–	–	7,152	1.39%	12,458	2.25%	19,971	3.6%
Asian or Asian British: Total	–	–	–	–	13,655	2.72%	25,583	4.98%	44,385	8.03%	53,560	9.6%
Asian or Asian British: Indian	–	–	–	–	1,415	–	3,030	0.59%	5,868	1.06%	6,798	1.2%
Asian or Asian British: Pakistani	–	–	–	–	8,880	1.77%	15,844	3.09%	21,990	3.98%	27,671	5.0%
Asian or Asian British: Bangladeshi	–	–	–	–	1,082	–	1,910	0.37%	3,326	0.60%	4,258	0.8%
Asian or Asian British: Chinese (Note: In 2001, listed under the 'Chinese or other ethnic group' heading.)	–	–	–	–	1,330	–	2,201	0.43%	7,398	1.34%	7,393	1.3%
Asian or Asian British: Other Asian	–	–	–	–	948	–	2,598	0.51%	5,803	1.05%	7,440	1.3%
Black or Black British: Total	–	–	–	–	7,972	1.59%	9,142	1.78%	20,082	3.63%	25,512	4.6%
Black or Black British: African	–	–	–	–	1,092	–	3,294	0.64%	11,543	2.09%	18,237	3.3%
Black or Black British: Caribbean	–	–	–	–	5,007	0.99%	5,171	1.01%	5,506	1.00%	4,647	0.8%
Black or Black British: Other Black	–	–	–	–	1,873	–	677	0.13%	3,033	0.55%	2,628	0.5%
Mixed: Total	–	–	–	–	–	–	8,228	1.60%	13,289	2.40%	19,704	3.5%
Mixed: White and Black Caribbean	–	–	–	–	–	–	3,704	0.72%	5,450	0.99%	7,524	1.4%
Mixed: White and Black African	–	–	–	–	–	–	711	0.14%	1,296	0.23%	2,431	0.4%
Mixed: White and Asian	–	–	–	–	–	–	2,085	0.41%	3,490	0.63%	5,214	0.9%
Mixed: Other Mixed	–	–	–	–	–	–	1,728	0.34%	3,053	0.55%	4,535	0.8%
Other: Total	–	–	–	–	3,598	-	2,064	0.40%	12,398	2.24%	17,531	3.1%
Other: Arab (Note: New category created for the 2011 census)	–	–	–	–	–	–	–	–	8,432	1.53%	8,956	1.6%
Other: Any other ethnic group	–	–	–	–	3,598	–	2,064	0.40%	3,966	0.72%	8,575	1.5%
Non-White: Total	10,551	2%	16,839	3.2%	25,225	5%	45,017	8.8%	90,154	16.3%	116,307	20.9%
Total	520,000	100%	525,634	100%	501,202	100%	513,234	100%	552,698	100%	556,523	100%

Notes for table above

By far the largest ethnic group in Sheffield is what the 2011 census classified as White British—white people of British ancestry, who make up about 81% of the city's population, an 8% drop from 2001. The remaining percentage of city's population includes a diverse range of ethnic backgrounds. Between the 1991 and 2001 census the minority ethnic population in Sheffield grew by more than 80%.

=== South Asians ===
The South Asian ethnic group which is people of Indian, Pakistani , Bangladeshi and Sri Lankan origin is the second largest ethnic group in the city comprising 32,400 people, with Pakistanis forming the largest group at 16,800 people. The community is mainly centred in the Sharrow, Burngreave, Darnall and Attercliffe areas where there are many mosques, temples, community centres, Bollywood cinemas and Asian clothes and food stores. The Sheffield South Asian community has a large influence on the city with a number of Asian politicians making up members of Sheffield City Council. There are several large multi-cultural festivals throughout the year, as well as many Asian markets and restaurants scattered around the city.

=== Somalis and Ethiopians ===
The Sheffield Somali community is the second largest and one of the oldest in the United Kingdom, with the first Somalis having arrived in Britain during the interwar period and more arriving, particularly to work in the city's steel industry, between the 1940s and 1960s. Most of the current population however have settled in Sheffield since the 1980s due to unrest and drought in their homeland. According to the Department for Communities and Local Government, estimates of the Somali community made between 2003 and 2007 ranged from 3,000 to 5,000. Based on data from the Information Centre about Asylum and Refugees, the International Organization for Migration gave an estimate of 10,000 in 2006. The number of people living Sheffield who were born in Somalia recorded by the 2011 UK Census was 2,372. According to community leaders, there were around 1,500 Ethiopians living in Sheffield in 2006.

=== Black Caribbeans ===
The Black Caribbean population in Sheffield is one of the largest in England with 9,100 people claiming Black Caribbean ancestry. There are no specific concentration of people in specific areas, although large communities do exist in Sharrow, Burngreave and Netherthorpe. Also in these areas are many Afro Caribbean restaurants, hair stylists, food stores and community centres the most notable being SADACCA located on The Wicker. Famous Afro Caribbean Sheffielders include: Steve Edwards, Jessica Ennis, Johnny Nelson, Oona King.

=== Black Africans ===
Black Africans are one of the newest and fastest growing ethnic groups in the city, with the majority being immigrants from war-torn or politically unstable countries. Most Black Africans tend to use Afro-Caribbean stores and community centres instead of starting up their own centres and stores. The majority of Black Africans live in Burngreave and are mainly from Zimbabwe, Kenya, Nigeria, the Democratic Republic of Congo, Burundi and Liberia. The number of Black Africans living in Sheffield in 2006 was 8,300.

=== East Europeans ===
There has been a large East European Community in Sheffield since the 1940s, when many Polish citizens settled in the city instead of returning to their homeland. A Polish Consulate was opened in Sheffield in 1997 in honour of this. The Sheffield East European community has grown substantially since 2004 when several East European countries joined the E.U with the main settlers being from Poland, Latvia and Slovakia. In July 2006 the Home Office gave Sheffield City Council extra funds to look after and house its large new immigrant East European communities. An interesting fact is that the Polish community in Sheffield despite the fact of its small size has own independent internet newspaper Sheffield24.pl which is active non-stop from 2011.

=== Chinese ===
The Chinese community is one of the smallest ethnic groups in Sheffield with only 5,900 permanent residents in 2006. The community is significantly larger during term time as many overseas students from China, Malaysia and Singapore study at Sheffield's two universities creating a large non-resident community. London Road in Sharrow is recognized as Sheffield's unofficial Chinatown due to its high concentration of restaurants, supermarkets and other stores. The Sheffield Chinese Community Centre is also based here.

=== Spanish ===
Sheffield has one of the largest Spanish-descended populations in the country, with over 3,000 Sheffielders of Spanish ancestry. Most origins in the city are from migration in the 20th century.

=== Other Groups ===
Other ethnic groups of Sheffield include Iranians, Kurds, Kosovars and British Yemeni who have made Sheffield their home over the years. The Kurds and Kosovars have moved to Sheffield in large numbers over the last ten years, many illegally or as Asylum seekers so the exact number of people of these groups living in the city is unknown. There are an estimated 3,500 – 9,000 Yemenis in Sheffield which is makes it one of the largest community in the UK. Many Yemenis emigrated to Sheffield since 1950. Other small ethnic groups in Sheffield include around 300 people of Chilean ancestry and around 300 people from Vietnam.

Sheffield is one of the UK's major cities that is part of the Gateway Protection Programme that has seen around 120 people from Liberia and Burma settle in the city. According to BBC's Born Abroad Sheffield has large clusters of Malaysians and Iranians.

Distribution of ethnic groups in Sheffield according to the 2011 census.
White

White-British

White-Irish

White-Other

Asian

Asian-Indian

Asian-Pakistani

Asian-Bangladeshi

Asian-Chinese

Black

Black-African

Black-Caribbean

Other-Arab

Ethnicity of school pupils

Ethnic group	School year			
Ethnic group	1997/1998		2021/2022	
Ethnic group	Number	%	Number	%
White: Total	56,809	87.8	55,144	65.9
White: British	–	–	50,144	59.8
White: Irish	–	–	131	0.2
White: Traveller of Irish heritage	–	–	55	0.1
White: Gypsy/Roma	–	–	1,739	2.1
White: Other	–	–	3,075	3.7
Asian / Asian British: Total			11,091	13.2
Asian / Asian British: Indian	198	0.3	875	1.0
Asian / Asian British: Pakistani	3,059	4.7	6,563	7.8
Asian / Asian British: Bangladeshi	394	0.6	1,016	1.2
Asian / Asian British: Chinese	222	0.3	629	0.8
Asian / Asian British: Other Asians	(Note: Included in ‘Other: Total’ category)		2,008	2.4
Black / Black British: Total	2,525	3.9	5,817	7
Black: Caribbean	1,046	1.6	474	0.6
Black: African	513	0.8	4,573	5.5
Black: Other Blacks	966	1.5	770	0.9
Mixed / British Mixed	–	–	7,097	8.5
Other: Total	1,012 (Note: Includes ‘Other Asians’)	1.6	3,246	3.9
Unclassified	485	0.7	1,433	1.7
Total:	64,704	100	83,828	100

== Languages ==
The most common main languages spoken in Sheffield according to the 2011 census are shown below.

Rank	Language	Usual residents aged 3+	Proportion
1	English	490,407	92.15%
2	Arabic	5,043	0.95%
3	Urdu	4,222	0.79%
4	Punjabi	2,743	0.52%
5	Polish	2,611	0.49%
6	Somali	2,074	0.39%
7	Bengali	1,515	0.28%
8	Slovak	1,244	0.23%
9	Persian	1,017	0.19%
10	Kurdish	960	0.18%
11	French	922	0.17%
12	Spanish	808	0.15%
13	Pashto	807	0.15%
14	Mandarin Chinese	609	0.11%
15	Turkish	566	0.11%
16	Russian	511	0.10%
17	Shona	508	0.10%
18	Cantonese Chinese	503	0.09%
19	Portuguese	499	0.09%
20	Greek	497	0.09%
	Other	14,098	2.65%

== Religion ==
Religious make up of Sheffield by single year age groups in 2021

The following table shows the religion of respondents in the 2001, 2011 and 2021 censuses in Sheffield.

Religion	2001		2011		2021	
Religion	Number	%	Number	%	Number	%
Christian	351,841	68.55%	290,299	52.52%	214,136	38.48%
Muslim	23,819	4.64%	42,801	7.74%	57,044	10.25%
Hindu	1,675	0.33%	3,566	0.65%	3,759	0.68%
Buddhist	1,096	0.21%	2,282	0.41%	2,215	0.40%
Sikh	773	0.15%	942	0.17%	927	0.17%
Jewish	763	0.15%	747	0.14%	649	0.12%
Other religion	1,215	0.24%	1,961	0.35%	2,635	0.47%
No religion	91,894	17.90%	172,516	31.21%	241,556	43.40%
Religion not stated	40,158	7.82%	37,584	6.80%	33,600	6.04%
Total	513,234	100.00%	552,698	100.00%	556,521	100.00%

Distribution of religions in Sheffield according to the 2011 census.
Christianity

Islam

Judaism

Hinduism

Sikhism

Buddhism

Other religion

No religion

== See also ==
- List of people from Sheffield
- Demographics of the United Kingdom
- Demographics of England
- Demographics of London
- Demographics of Birmingham
- Demographics of Greater Manchester
- List of ONS built-up areas in England by population
- List of English districts by population
- List of English districts by ethnicity
- List of English districts by area
- List of English districts by population density
