= Perry Vale (ward) =

Electoral ward in London, England

- Electoral ward for the Lewisham London Borough Council
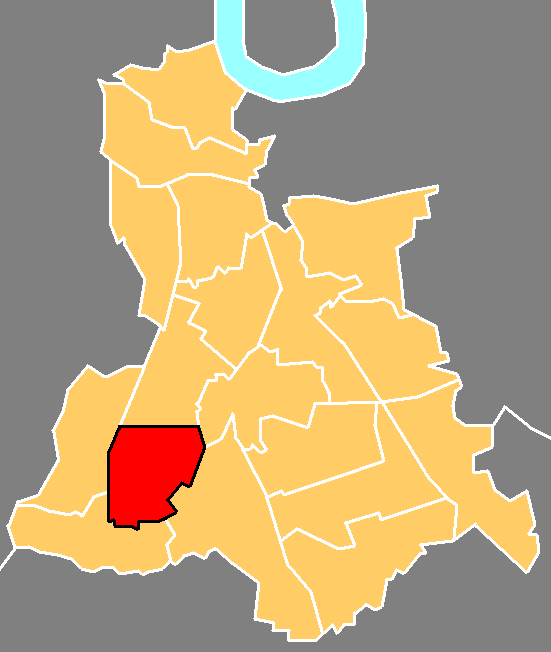
- Perry Vale in Lewisham (in red)
- Borough: Lewisham
- County: Greater London
- Population: 18,657 (2021)
- Major settlements: Perry Vale
- Area: 2.172 km²

Current electoral ward
- Created: 2002
- Councillors: 3

Perry Vale is an electoral ward in the Borough of Lewisham. The ward was first used in the 2002 elections and elects three councillors to Lewisham London Borough Council.

== Geography ==
The ward is named after the Perry Vale area.

== Councillors ==
| Election | Councillors | | |
|---|---|---|---|
| 2022 | Sakina Sheikh (Labour) | Susan Wise (Labour) | John Paschoud (Labour) |

== Elections ==
=== 2022 ===
Perry Vale (3)
| Party | Candidate | Votes | % | ±% |
|---|---|---|---|---|
| Labour | Sakina Sheikh* | 2,680 | 61.6 | |
| Labour | Susan Wise* | 2,605 | 59.9 | |
| Labour | John Paschoud* | 2,596 | 59.7 | |
| Green | Adela Pickles | 1,193 | 27.4 | |
| Green | Robert McIntosh | 1,161 | 26.7 | |
| Liberal Democrats | Alex Feakes | 638 | 14.7 | |
| Conservative | William Stevenson | 495 | 11.4 | |
| Conservative | Bettina Skeen | 463 | 10.6 | |
| Liberal Democrats | Alan Harding | 449 | 10.3 | |
| Conservative | Peter Thurgood | 438 | 10.1 | |
| Liberal Democrats | Alan Muhammed | 329 | 7.6 | |
| Turnout | | | 36.6 | |
| Labour hold | | Swing | | |
| Labour hold | | Swing | | |
| Labour hold | | Swing | | |
