= Jim Dowd (politician) =

Former British Labour Party politician

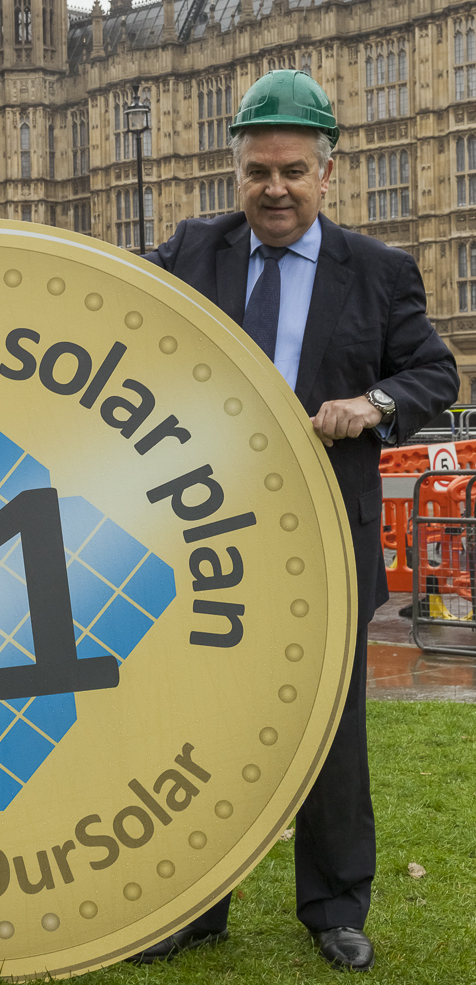

Lord Commissioner of the Treasury
- In office 8 May 1997 – 12 June 2001
- Prime Minister: Tony Blair
- Preceded by: Richard Ottaway
- Succeeded by: Anne McGuire

Member of Parliament for Lewisham West and Penge Lewisham West (1992–2010)
- In office 9 April 1992 – 3 May 2017
- Preceded by: John Maples
- Succeeded by: Ellie Reeves

Personal details
- Born: 5 March 1951 (age 75) Bad Eilsen, West Germany
- Party: Labour
- Spouse: Janet Anderson (m. 2016; died 2023)

James Patrick Dowd (born 5 March 1951) is a former British Labour Party politician, who was a Member of Parliament (MP) from 1992 to 2017, first for Lewisham West and following 2010 for Lewisham West and Penge. He stood down at the 2017 general election, following the announcement of Prime Minister Theresa May's snap election in June 2017.

== Early life ==
Jim Dowd grew up in Lewisham, London, with an Irish father and German mother. He was educated at the Dalmain Infant and Junior Schools in Forest Hill; Sedgehill School, Catford, and the London Nautical School, Lambeth. He began his career in telephone engineering as an apprentice in 1967 with the General Post Office (GPO). Following his apprenticeship, he became a manager in 1972 at a Heron petrol station for a year before joining Plessey as a telecommunications engineer in 1973, where he remained until his election to the House of Commons.

Dowd was elected as a councillor in the London Borough of Lewisham in 1974, becoming deputy leader in 1984 for two years. He was twice deputy mayor in 1987 and 1990, and was the Mayor of Lewisham in 1992. He stepped down from the council in 1994.

Dowd first stood for parliament at the 1983 general election for the seat of Beckenham, finishing in third place behind the long-standing Conservative MP Philip Goodhart by 17,330 votes. At the 1987 general election he contested the marginal seat of Lewisham West, but was defeated by John Maples by 3,772 votes.

== Parliamentary career ==
At the 1992 general election, Dowd again contested Lewisham West, and defeated Maples by 1,809 votes. He made his maiden speech in the House of Commons on 10 June 1992.

Jim Dowd was appointed as an opposition whip in 1994, before becoming the spokesman on Northern Ireland in 1995. Following the election of the Labour government at the 1997 General Election he was given a place in the Blair government as a whip. He was unexpectedly sacked after the 2001 general election, since when he was a member of the Health Select Committee and maintained a voting record strongly in line with government policies. In June 2012, Dowd joined the Science and Technology Select Committee.

In 2005, he was involved in a heated confrontation in Parliament with fellow Labour MP Bob Marshall-Andrews over the Terrorism Bill. He was a vice-chair of the All Party Parliamentary Intellectual Property Group.

He supported Owen Smith in the failed attempt to replace Jeremy Corbyn in the 2016 Labour Party (UK) leadership election.

=== Intellectual Property Bill ===
On 20 January 2014, Dowd made a speech in the House of Commons during a debate on the Intellectual Property Bill, stating that he had asked for Worcester Sauce whilst eating a meal at the Hare and Billet pub in Blackheath and that he was provided with Henderson's Relish. Dowd used Henderson's as an example of "parasitic packaging", implying in the debate that it was attempting to pass itself off as Lea and Perrins.

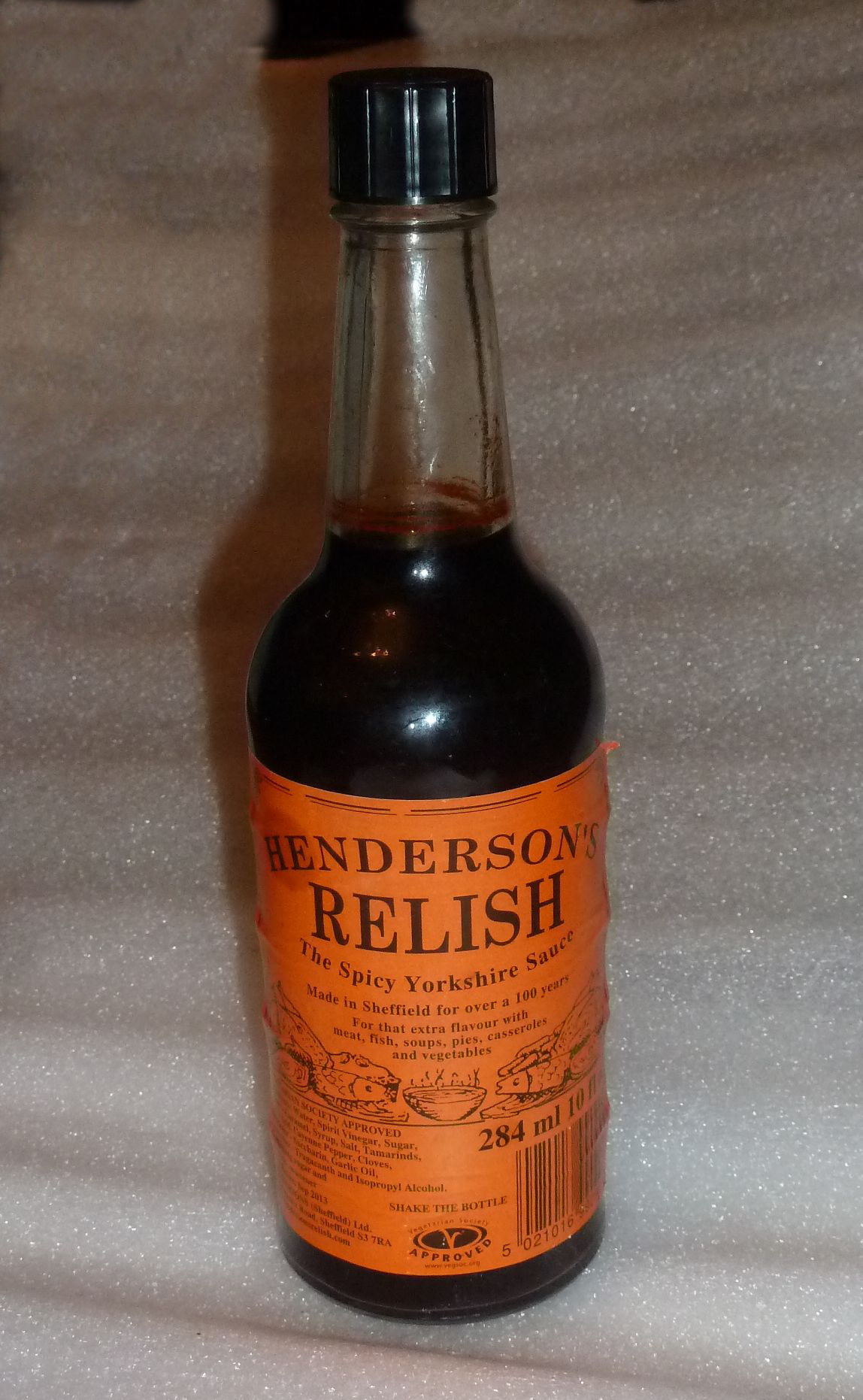
Henderson's Relish

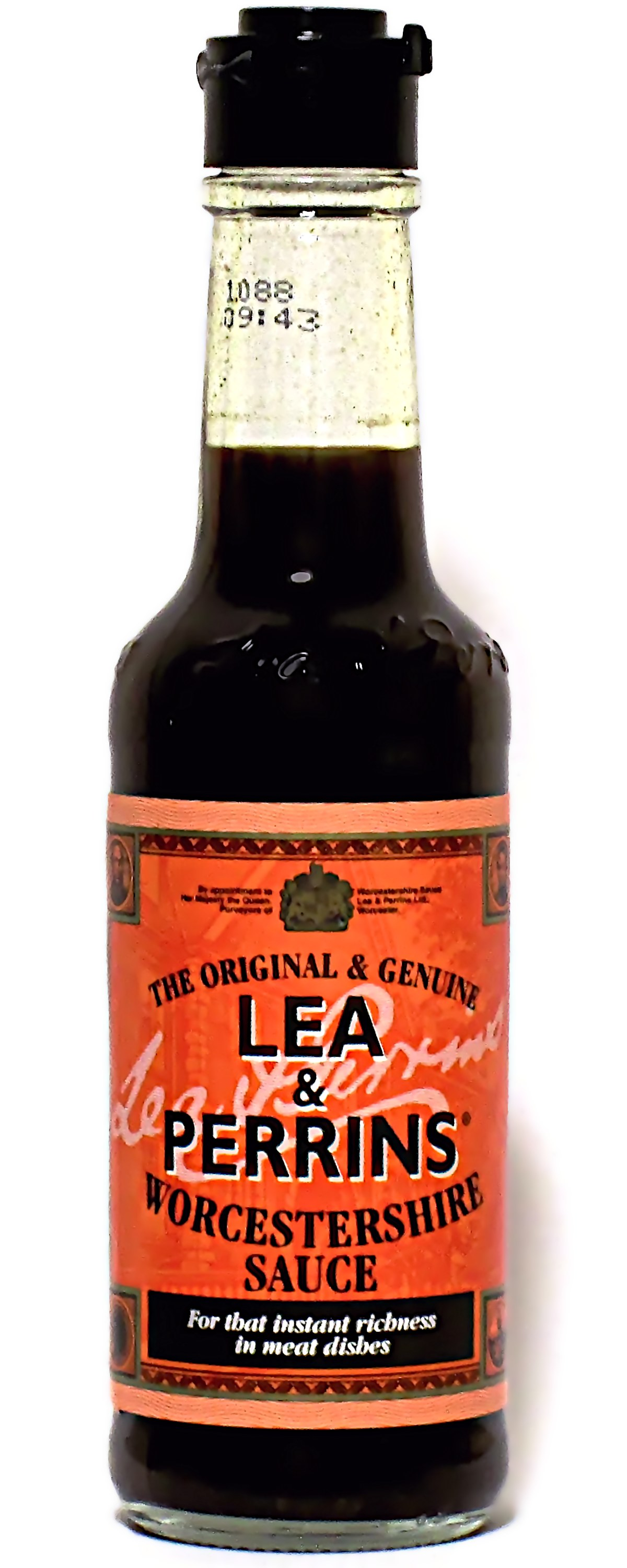
Lea & Perrins Worcestershire sauce

Henderson's Relish is well known within Sheffield and parts of Yorkshire and has been manufactured there for over 100 years. Dowd upset supporters of the sauce; the Sheffield Central member of parliament, Paul Blomfield, offered to bring a bottle to Parliament and invite Dowd for a meal with him using it – an invitation accepted by Dowd.

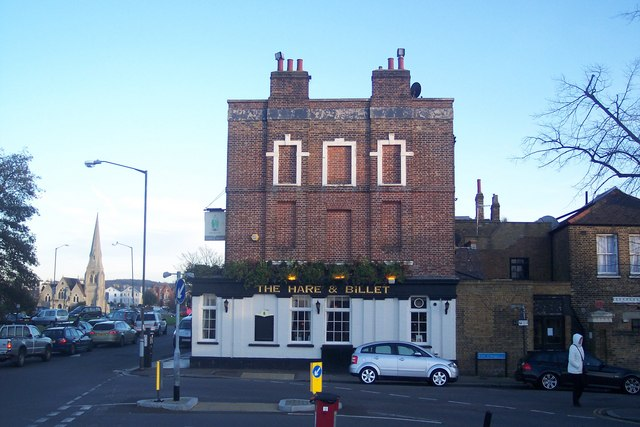
The Hare and Billet

Simon Freeman – the managing director of Henderson's – jokingly stated that he would order "an internal investigation to find out how it got out of Yorkshire"; a local newspaper, the Sheffield Star, launched a Twitter campaign with the hashtag #Hendogate to defend Henderson's, attracting support locally. Dowd later stated his "amazement" at the backlash his comments had caused, which he said included threats of violence. The assistant manager of the Hare and Billet – Adam Beaston – claimed that Dowd branded Henderson's a "blatant copy" of Lea and Perrins at the time but that he warned the MP that such a view would be "blasphemy in Sheffield".

== Personal life ==
Dowd lists his interests as music, theatre and reading, and enjoys travelling in Cornwall. In 1998, he began a relationship with Janet Anderson, a fellow Labour MP. The couple married in 2016 and remained together until her death in 2023.

Parliament of the United Kingdom
Preceded by John Maples	Member of Parliament for Lewisham West; 1992–2010	Constituency abolished
New constituency	Member of Parliament for Lewisham West and Penge; 2010–2017	Succeeded by Ellie Reeves
