= Perry Vale =

Neighbourhood of London

Coordinates: 51.435°N 0.043°W

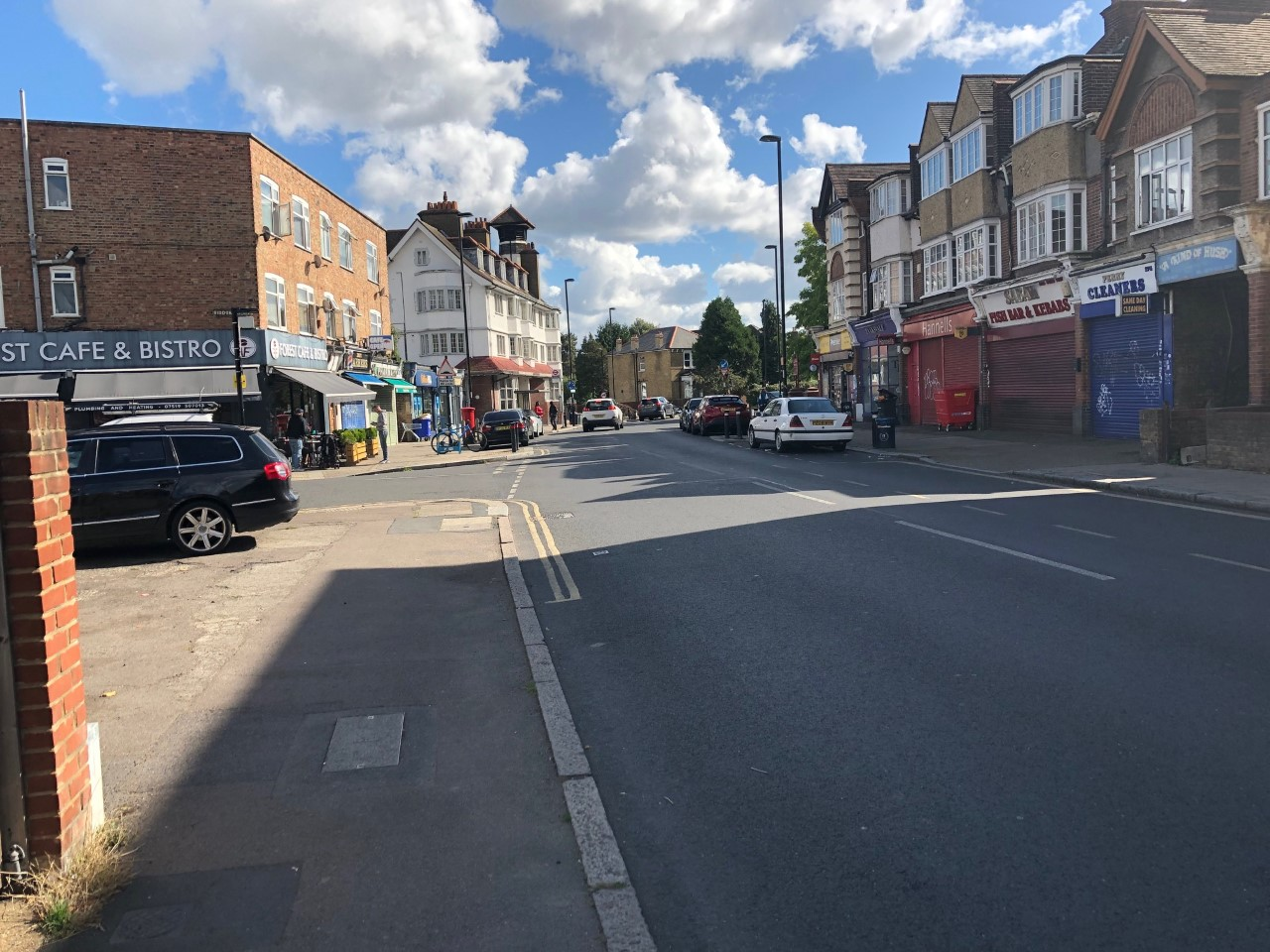

- Location within Greater London
- Population: 15,618 (2011 Census. Ward)
- OS grid reference: TQ36017254
- London borough: Lewisham
- Ceremonial county: Greater London
- Region: London
- Country: England
- Sovereign state: United Kingdom
- Post town: LONDON
- Postcode district: SE23
- Dialling code: 020
- Police: Metropolitan
- Fire: London
- Ambulance: London
- UK Parliament: Lewisham West and East Dulwich
- London Assembly: Greenwich and Lewisham

Perry Vale is a neighbourhood in the London Borough of Lewisham. It is 10.5 km (6.5 mi) southeast of Charing Cross and located near Forest Hill to the east of Forest Hill railway station, where the railway line forms the western boundary. The ward is named after the main road Perry Vale which passes through, this road is part of the B227 road which is called Perry Rise further to the south. The electoral ward has existed since the London Borough of Lewisham revised its wards and ward boundaries in 2002.

From 1978 to 2002 a similarly named ward Perry Hill existed. It was smaller and covered some of the same area, but was slightly more to the east. This ward was named after the A212 road which is called Perry Hill as it passes through running from Catford to Sydenham.

== History ==
The area was once part of ancient wooded commons known as the Great North Wood and was not much settled before the 18th century. Running through the area was a lane that today forms the modern roads known as Perry Vale and Perry Rise. It branched off what is now called Woolstone Road to give routes to what was originally known as Perry Street but is now called Perry Hill, and also to what was originally known as Sydenham Green but is now called Bell Green. These routes are visible on maps from 1741 onward.

The 18th century 118 and 118A Perry Vale date from 1778 and give evidence of a historic hamlet located just before the junctions of Perry Vale, Perry Rise and Woolstone Road. On 18th century maps this hamlet is named as Perrys Low, Perry Slow and Perry's Slough. Local tradition associates the name with the manufacture of perry, alcoholic drink brewed from pears. However, 19th century maps show fields and not orchards.

In the 19th century change was brought to the area by the opening of the nearby Croydon Canal in 1809 and which was replaced by the London and Croydon Railway in 1839, the enclosure of Sydenham Common in 1810, and the re-location of The Crystal Palace to the area in 1854. The area surrounding Hamilton Hall on South Road includes the oldest surviving buildings and appears to have been levelled before 1854. What was formerly communal land was parcelled out to large local landowners, William Legge, 5th Earl of Dartmouth being awarded Pickthorns which was roughly the area bounded by the modern Sunderland Road, Westbourne Drive, Stanstead Road and Perry Vale. The earl built a middleclass suburb on Pickthorns of semi-detached villas known as Dartmouth Park. The centrepiece of this was the Christ Church and the mansion known as The Red Hall in South Road which became a private girls' school called Tudor Hall School in 1865. Work on the church started in 1852 but was not completed until 1885. The building that housed the girls school, known as Tudor Hall Ladies College in 1907 survives only in part today as the Tudor House flats in South Road.

Most of today's houses in Gaynesford Road, Sunderland Road, Church Rise and Perry Vale were built between 1901 and 1906 by local Forest Hill builder, Ted Christmas. The area suffered extensively from bombing during World War II, in particular on Church Rise, Perry Vale and Sunderland Road, including from V-1 flying bombs.

== Governance ==
Perry Vale is part of the Perry Vale electoral ward for elections to Lewisham London Borough Council.

== Notable residents ==
- Mary Seymour Munro (d. 1849) interned at Norwood, lived at Perry Hill, daughter of Sir Hugh Munro, 8th Baronet (d. 1848).

== Gallery ==
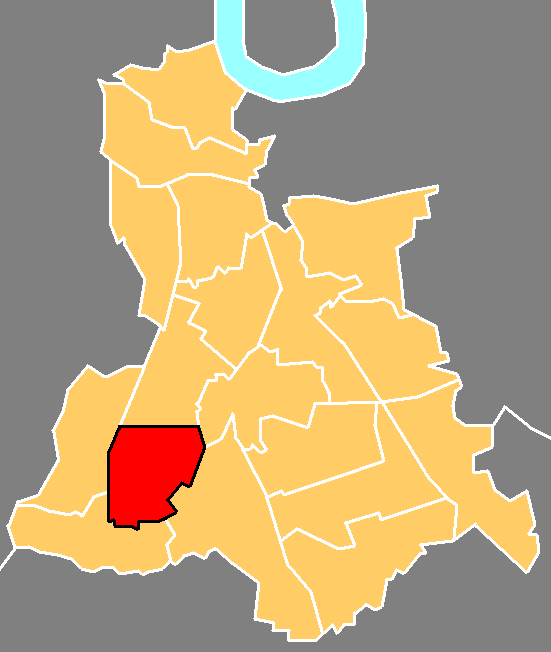
The ward of Perry Vale (red) within the London Borough of Lewisham (orange)

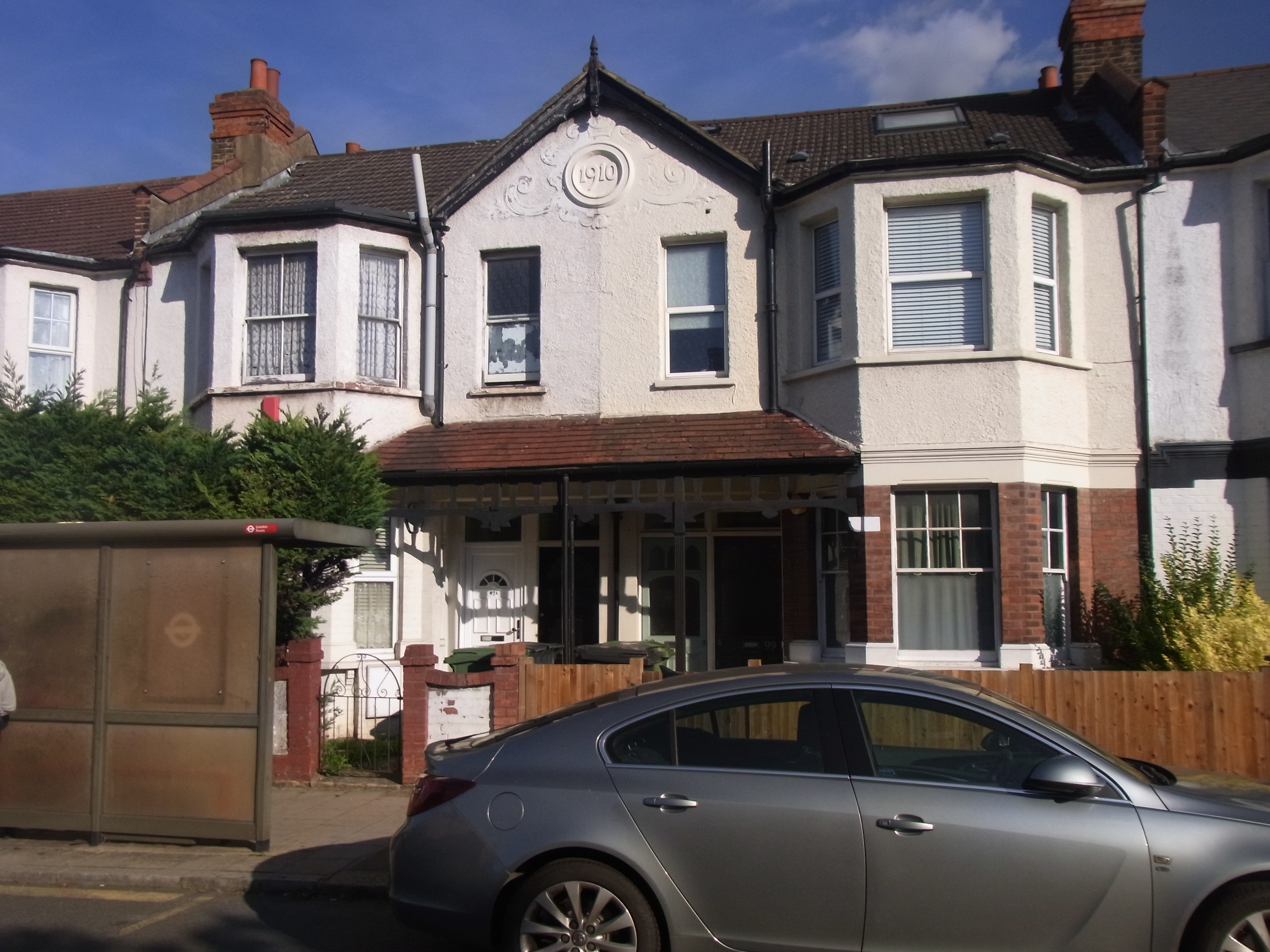
97-99 Perry Hill with 1910 date stone

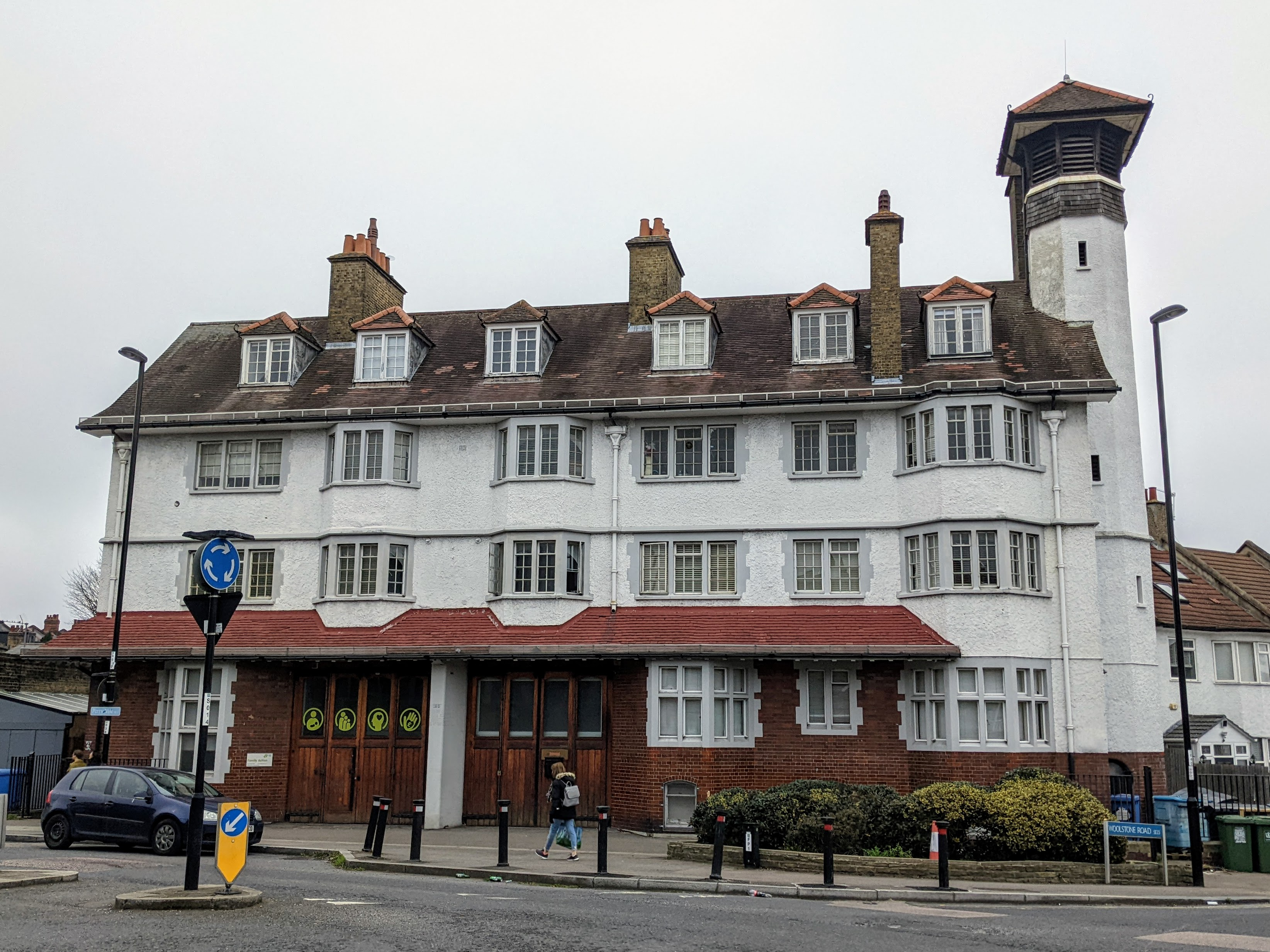
The old Perry Vale fire station, now flats

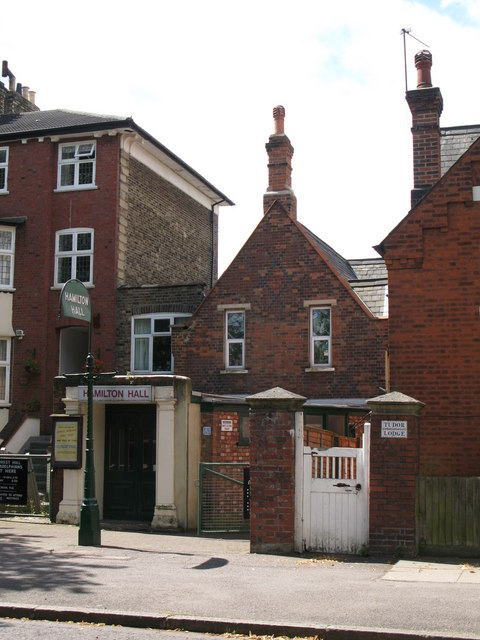
Hamilton Hall on South Road, centre of the historic area of Perry Vale
