= St Margaret's Church, Leicester =

Large medieval prebendal church with Anglo Saxon foundations in Leicester, England

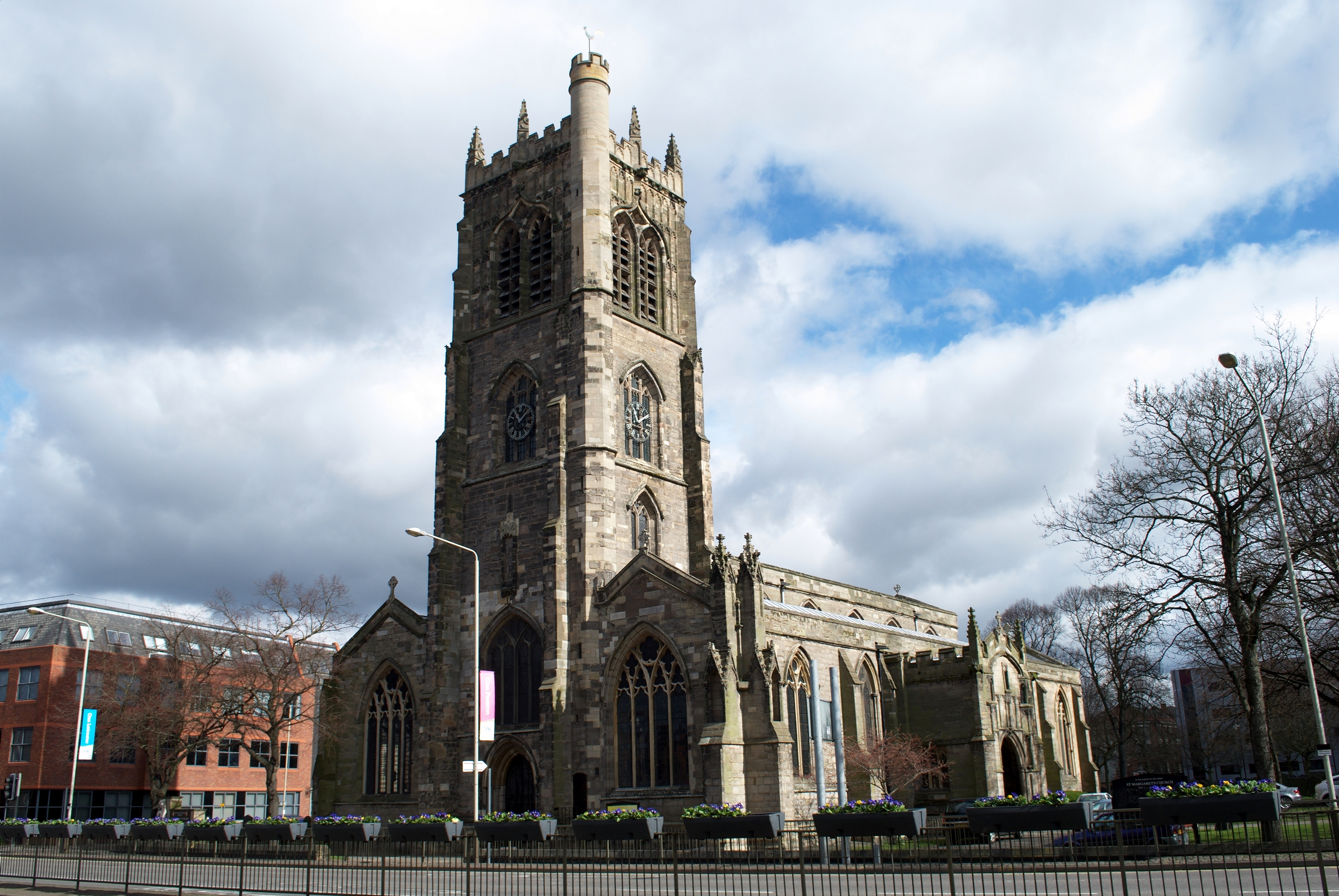
- View of west front and tower
- St Margaret's Church, Leicester
- 52.64030°N 1.13625°W
- Denomination: Church of England
- Previous denomination: Roman Catholic
- Churchmanship: Broad church
- Website: St Margarets Leicester

History
- Status: Parish Church; Prebendal Church
- Dedication: Margaret of Antioch

Administration
- Province: Canterbury
- Diocese: Leicester
- Archdeaconry: Leicester
- Parish: The Abbey

Clergy
- Bishop: Rt. Rev. Martyn Snow
- Vicar: Interregnum

Listed Building – Grade I
- Designated: 5 Jan 1950
- Reference no.: 1074072

Map of central Leicester showing the location of the Prebendal Church of St Margaret's (marked in green) among the key historic sites of Leicester Old Town. The other four medieval churches are marked in boldly in red. The Roman and medieval walls are marked by the dotted line. The one surviving Roman ruin is in purple, secular sites are in blue, and dissolved religious houses in black.

St Margaret's Church, Leicester, more formally the Prebendal Church of St Margaret's, Leicester, is a large late medieval Anglican parish church constructed on Anglo Saxon foundations in inner city Leicester, England. One of the five surviving medieval parish churches of Leicester Old Town, (Note: The other four are All Saints, St Martin's (cathedral), St Mary de Castro, and St Nicholas.) medieval tradition held it to be the mother church of the borough, its oldest place of Christian worship, perhaps dating back to 679. (Note: In the 20th century there has been a popular shift away from the medieval tradition and St Nicholas is credited by many historians and guides with precedence.) It is also the only one of the towns churches to be located extramurally (outside the now vanished Roman walls of Leicester). The large suburban and rural parish covered the territory of the Bishops Fee and was a prebendal peculiar of Lincoln between 1199 and 1879, retaining the title of prebendal church by convention since.

Reconstructed at least four times in its history, most notably in the 15th century, the present structure was described by the antiquarians John Leyland and John Nichols as "the fairest parish church in Leicester" while Nicholas Pevsner noted that its vaulted double height south porch and the towers stair turret are both unique in Leicestershire. Today, thanks both to its monumental perpendicular tower and its location opposite Leicester's busiest bus station, it is one of the city's most recognisable historic structures. It is also noted across Leicestershire and the wider East Midlands for its large peal of 14 bells, ten of which have been in the tower since the 17th century. It is a Grade I Listed Building and a member of the Major Churches Network.

== History ==
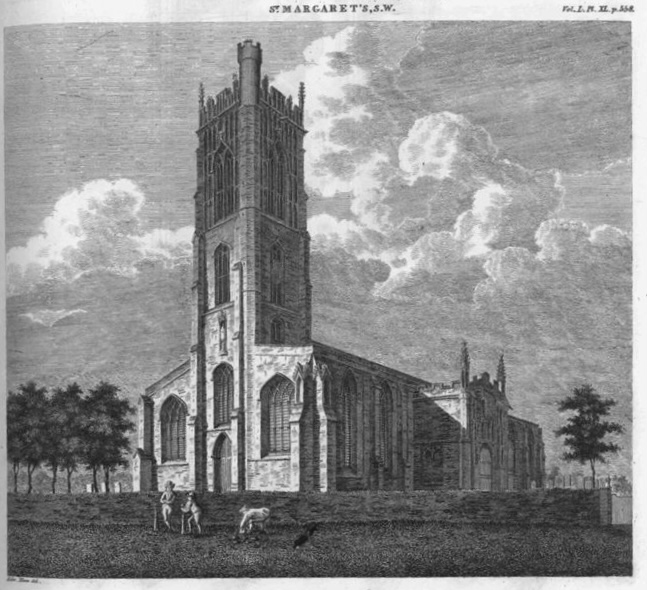
Late 18th century engraving of the west end of the church taken from John Nichols History and Antiquities of the County of Leicester.

St Margaret's has a long and complex history dating back perhaps as early the seventh century. The building is 12th, 13th, and mostly 15th century. Saxon foundations dating to the 9th or 10th century have also been uncovered. In medieval times it was venerated as the mother church of the Borough of Leicester, the oldest of its various Christian places of worship. It was also thought to be the former minster of its Anglo Saxon Bishops between 679 and the coming of the Vikings in the 870's. Because of this it became a focal point for all of Leicester's other parishes and monastic houses, the destination of the town's principal annual procession on Whit Monday.

After the Norman Conquest in 1110 it remained one of only two churches in Leicester in the hands of the Bishop of Lincoln. This was because it served as the parish church and administrative hub of a large estate known as the Bishops Fee owned by the Diocese of Lincoln. St Margaret's also maintained a chapel of ease at Knighton, today the parish church of St Mary Magdalene, Knighton, in the far reaches of that estate. From the late 12th century the parish became a prebend and the church a prebendal peculiar. This exempted St Margaret's from normal diocesan authority placing it under the personal rule of a senior clergyman called a prebendary. Because the eastern and northern suburbs of Leicester Old Town fell into the vast predominantly rural estate of the Bishops Fee, the Bishop of Lincoln could levy taxes on them helping to fund the elaborate construction and decoration of the church.

Unlike the parishes constrained by the town walls, the eastern suburb could expand into open countryside meaning an ever-expanding population to fill the congregation in the early 19th century. During the 19th- and 20th-century expansion of the town, many new daughter parishes were carved out of St Margaret's historic territory significantly reducing the area it served. Further to this 19th-century redrawing of the parish boundaries, in the 20th century it was expanded again, over the River Soar and into the territory within the old town walls, when the neighbouring parishes of St Leonard's and All Saints were amalgamated with St Margaret's. The prebend was abolished in 1879 ending the peculiarity of the parish and making the church's prebendal status purely honorary. Since the 1960s, the 19th century mix of industrial, commercial, and domestic buildings in the parish were cleared away when the inner ring road was constructed. This cut the historic old town in two and divided St Margaret's from its historic parochial hubs in the northern and eastern suburbs (the eastern suburb has become Leicester City Centre) as well as removing the resident population.

In its long history St Margaret's was associated with the names of many notable churchmen and Leicestrians. Of the churchmen these include possibly all the early bishops of Leicester, William of Blois, Jocelin of Wells, Robert Grosseteste, Thomas Wolsey, and many others. Of the locals the most notable would probably be Robert le Bossu, John Penny and Mary Linwood.

=== The site in Roman and medieval times ===
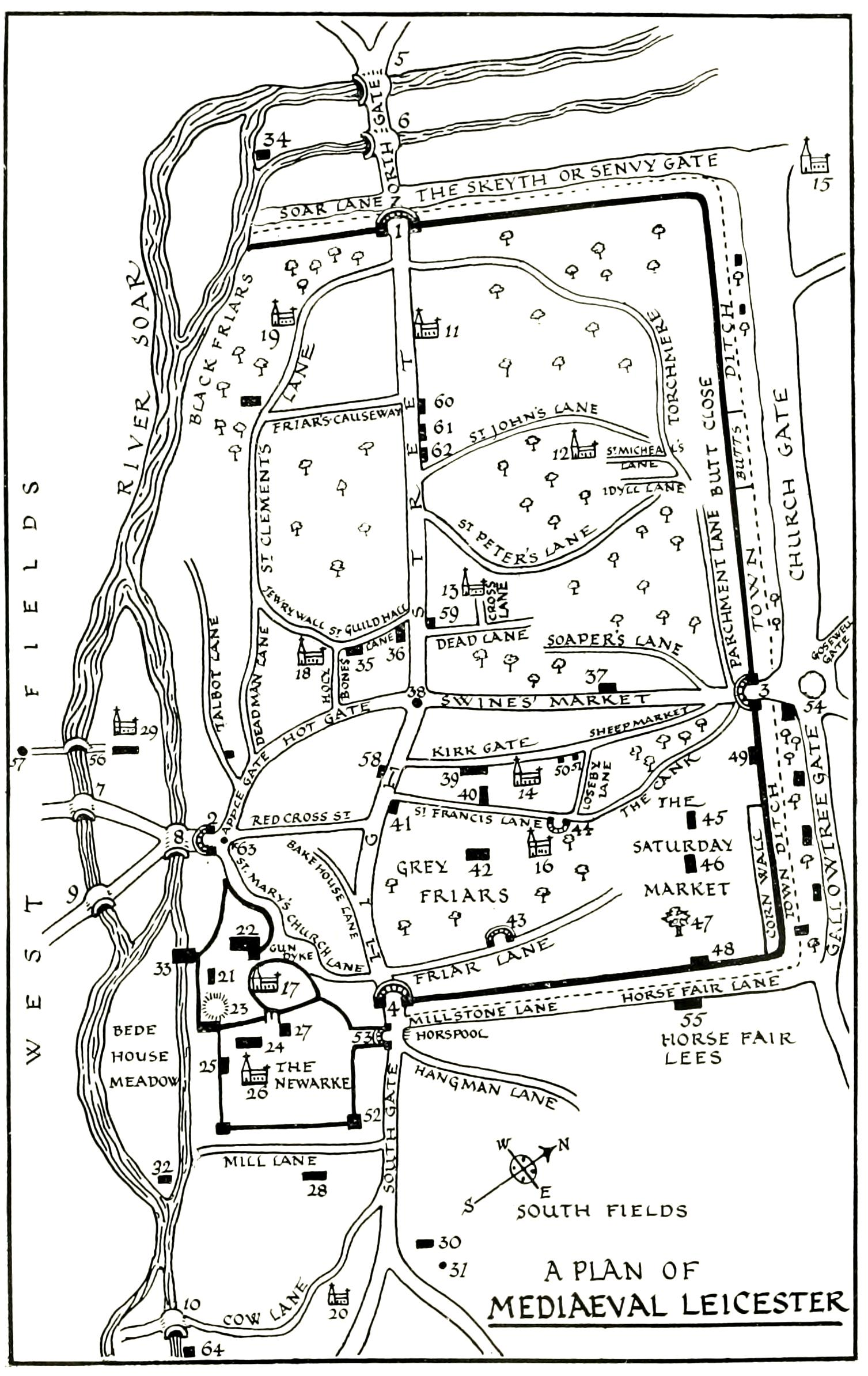
Medieval Leicester from Charles J. Billson's 1920 work Medieval Leicester. St Margaret's extramural location is marked by the number 15 in the top left-hand corner of the image.

The site presently occupied by St Margaret's Church stood outside the northernmost corner of the city walls of the ancient settlement of Ratae Corieltauvorum. The two diverging walls are represented by Sanvey Gate, following the route of the north wall, and Church Gate (whose lower section became the southern end of St Margaret's Way after redevelopment in the 1960s), following the route of the east wall. These walls survived the Roman occupation and became the boundary of the ancient borough of Leicester. During Roman times the area was used as cemetery.

After the Roman occupation the areas outside the old northern and eastern city gates gradually became suburbs which the church of St Margaret would serve. The track skirting the northern wall opposite the church became the cities principal processional route known as Sanvey Gate, an early English derivative of Sacra Via or Holy Way.

=== Possible origins of the church ===
==== Traditional origin account ====
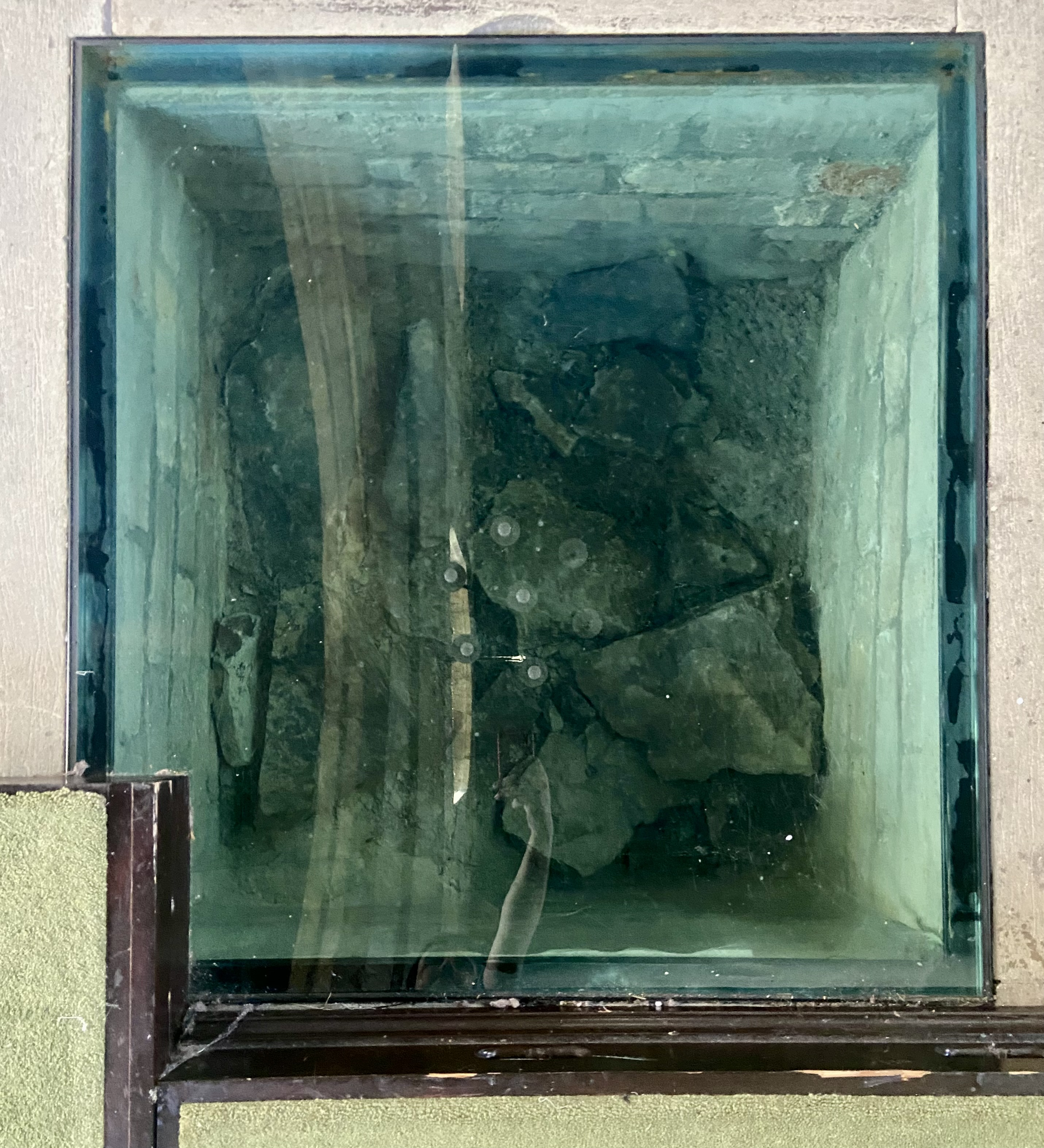
Excavated Saxon foundations in the nave.

In the Middle Ages evidence suggests St Margaret's was regarded as the mother church of the Borough of Leicester, the oldest Christian place of worship in the town, and the cathedral church of the ancient bishops of Leicester (679–874). This is backed up by records of pre-reformation religious tradition, the Whit Monday procession (see below) being always made the local mother church by a group of parishes. It was also upheld by John Leyland's report in his Itineraries of 1538, which assumed St Margaret's to have been the ancient cathedral. This account was quoted by John Nichols in his History and Antiquities of the County of Leicester of 1795. The 1860 architectural history of William Jackson in the Transactions of the Leicestershire Archaeological and Historical Society speaks of "a dim record of a cathedral which stood here in the seventh century." The dim record was maintained as a certitude in Mrs T Fielding Johnson's 1891 work Glimpses of Ancient Leicester, the first clear modern source of the mother church tradition.

There were almost certainly Christians in the Roman settlement of Ratae which preceded Leicester. However, mass conversion to the faith only occurred after the 6th and 7th centuries, in the aftermath of Saint Cedd's mission to the Mercian Middle Angles in 653. The mission returned with Prince Peada after he had made pilgrimage to Northumbria to receive instruction in the Christian faith and baptism. It was a late wave of the broader Hiberno-Scottish missions that had converted northern England and had its origins on the Holy Island of Lindisfarne and in the missionary efforts and teaching work of Saint Aidan and Saint Cuthbert. The tradition would suggest that the church was perhaps established as early as the 7th century, either early after the mission of 653 or sometime after 679 when the ancient See of Leicester was created for Cuthwine, and certainly before the flight of the last bishop Ceobred in 874. In modern times this traditional belief has fallen out of favour and St Nicholas Church is now commonly regarded as the earliest place of Christian worship in Leicester Old Town. This is perhaps because only foundations survive at St Margaret's while a complete 9th century nave and 11th century tower survive at St Nicholas. It is also because the mother church tradition has been increasingly forgotten in the aftermath of the reformation, most especially during the 20th century after its 19th-century recovery.

==== A saints shrine or Roman place of worship ====
A modern hypothesis found in church guidebooks supposes that St Margaret's was constructed over the grave of a revered local Romano British Christian around whom a cult had developed. The theory is based on the fact that the church stands in a Romano British cemetery. This was the origin of many churches including the Basilicas of St Peter and St Paul in Rome and St Albans Abbey in England. It would also favour a very early dating. This hypothesis is speculative, not reflected by the dedication to Margaret of Antioch. There is also no mention of the cult of an ancient Saxon saint in records of parish devotional life from the later Middle Ages.

An earlier version of this theory hypothesised by Ernest Morris is that the site may have had surviving evidence of Romano British Christian practice. This might account for the medieval attribution of mother church status to St Margaret's. Again this is speculative since no evidence survives in the church fabric nor are there any historic accounts to support it.

==== A church for Leicester's Vikings ====
The most recent and now widespread theory is that St Margaret's was built to serve the Norse speaking Viking population of Leicester which settled in around 874-7 AD following the invasion of the Great Heathen Army. For just over 40 years between 877 and 918 the Vikings had the ascendancy over the Anglo Saxons in the town and Leicester was one of the Five Boroughs of the Danelaw. In 917 Edward the Elder and Ethelfleda, the children of the Alfred the Great, reconquered Leicester and the rest of the Danelaw returning it to Anglo Saxon leadership. The Viking theory of St Margaret's origin assumes the Danish citizens either departed from the city walls following reconquest or had never chosen to settle within them and that they were responsible for developing the eastern and northern suburbs. This is plausible from the widespread use of the word gate instead of street (from the Old Norse word gata, meaning street) in the eastern and northern suburbs covered by St Margaret's historic parish. It would also assume the church was either founded by or resulted from the evangelisation efforts of Ethelfleda. Ethelfleda has been credited with the reconstruction of the town walls, the nave of St Nicholas, and the foundation of St Mary de Castro.

A Viking foundation would rule out the possibility of St Margaret's being Leicester's oldest Christian place of worship. Christianity arrived in the 7th century while the Vikings arrived in the 9th and only converted to Christianity in the 10th. However, if we assume that they reconstructed a church they had earlier desecrated following their conversion to Christianity then the two theories can be held in tandem. This appears to be the approach of some who have reviewed the recorded history.

=== Anglo Saxon church ===
Whatever origin theory is preferred it is certainly the case that the church's history began before the Norman Conquest. This was confirmed by the excavation of a small section in the eastern part of the nave. It revealed the Saxon foundation stones and these are now visible through a glass window in the floor in the nave.

==== Earliest stone church ====
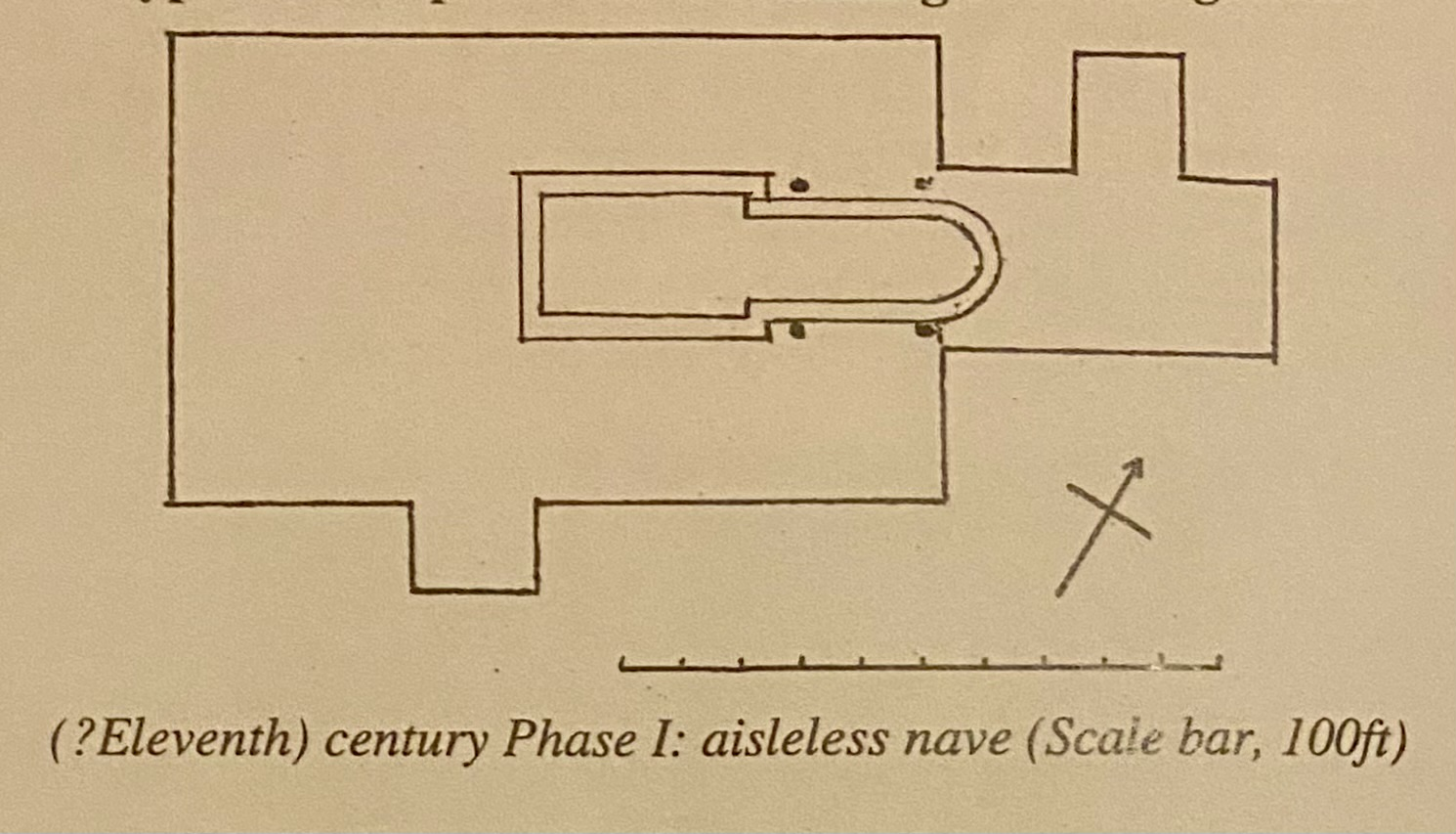
Plan of excavated Saxon foundations with 13th and 15th century structure overlaid.

The few stones visible beneath the floor at the east end of the nave are part of a longer wall excavated in the early 20th century. They mark out a church similar in form to St Peter-on-the-Wall in Essex or St Laurence's, Bradford on Avon. The remains have been cautiously dated to 1010, just 50 years before the Norman Conquest and over 100 years after the nave of St Nicholas is thought to have been constructed. This dating is speculative given the marginal remains nor are those foundations certainly the earliest, merely the earliest thus far excavated.

==== Viking connection ====
As mentioned above, a key theory of the churches origin centres around the fact of the Viking occupation of St Margaret's parish. Even if the more traditional narrative is true there is still very strong evidence for Viking predominance in the early medieval east and north suburbs. The street names in those parts of the modern city still feature the word 'gate', from the Old Norse word gata meaning street. The roads within the town walls are more often known as street or lane except on the sites of the ancient entrances east, north, and south. St Margaret's territories covered Church Gate, Belgrave Gate, Humberstone Gate, Gallowtree Gate, Sanvy Gate, Soar Lane, and Northgate Street. The names of these streets speak for themselves of the Viking connection.

=== Dedication to St Margaret ===
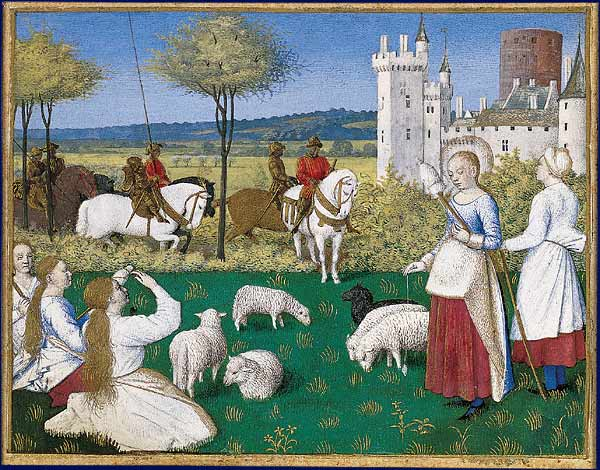
St Margaret shepherdess among her sheep and holding a distaff observed by the Prefect Olybrius

The dedication to Margaret of Antioch is ancient, perhaps original to the church, but it is unknown when it was formally adopted. A popular virgin martyr and one of the famous Fourteen Holy Helpers, she was widely admired across medieval Europe. The most popular story of Margaret of Antioch from the Legenda Aurea states that she became a shepherdess when disowned by her family for converting to Christianity. The extramural location of St Margaret's church and its roll as the church of both the borough suburbs and the large rural Bishops Fee meant it united sheep farmers and wool merchants into a single community. Wool was the principal source of wealth for medieval Leicester and the towns association with the material may long predate the Norman Conquest. It is fairly clear why a saint often depicted as tending sheep, spinning yarn, holding a distaff, and weaving wool was chosen as patron saint of the mother church of a borough whose principal trade was wool and whose prebend covered two thousands of acres mostly devoted to sheep farming.

=== St Margaret's in the aftermath of the Norman Conquest ===
Following the Norman Conquest, Leicester's diocesan seat was removed from Dorchester to Lincoln in 1072 under the new Norman bishop Remigius. His appointment heralded a significant reorganisation and strengthening of the institutional structures governing Leicester's Christians. This included an increase in documentation and the first certain reference to the church appears in 1110.

==== Episcopal patronage ====
After the conquest all the advowsons of the churches within Leicester's town walls were passed to Hugh de Grandmesnil, the first Sheriff of Leicester responsible for constructing Leicester Castle. This patronage would be managed the college of canons at St Mary de Castro (also under the Earls patronage). The advowson of St Margaret's alone remained in the hands of the Bishop of Lincoln, together with that of its dependent Knighton chapelry. Later the Earls churches would pass into the hands of Leicester Abbey just over the River Soar from St Margaret's. St Margaret's thus came to stand as a symbol of the authority of the Diocese of Lincoln in Leicester, otherwise dominated by the authority of its own abbey.

==== Parish boundaries ====
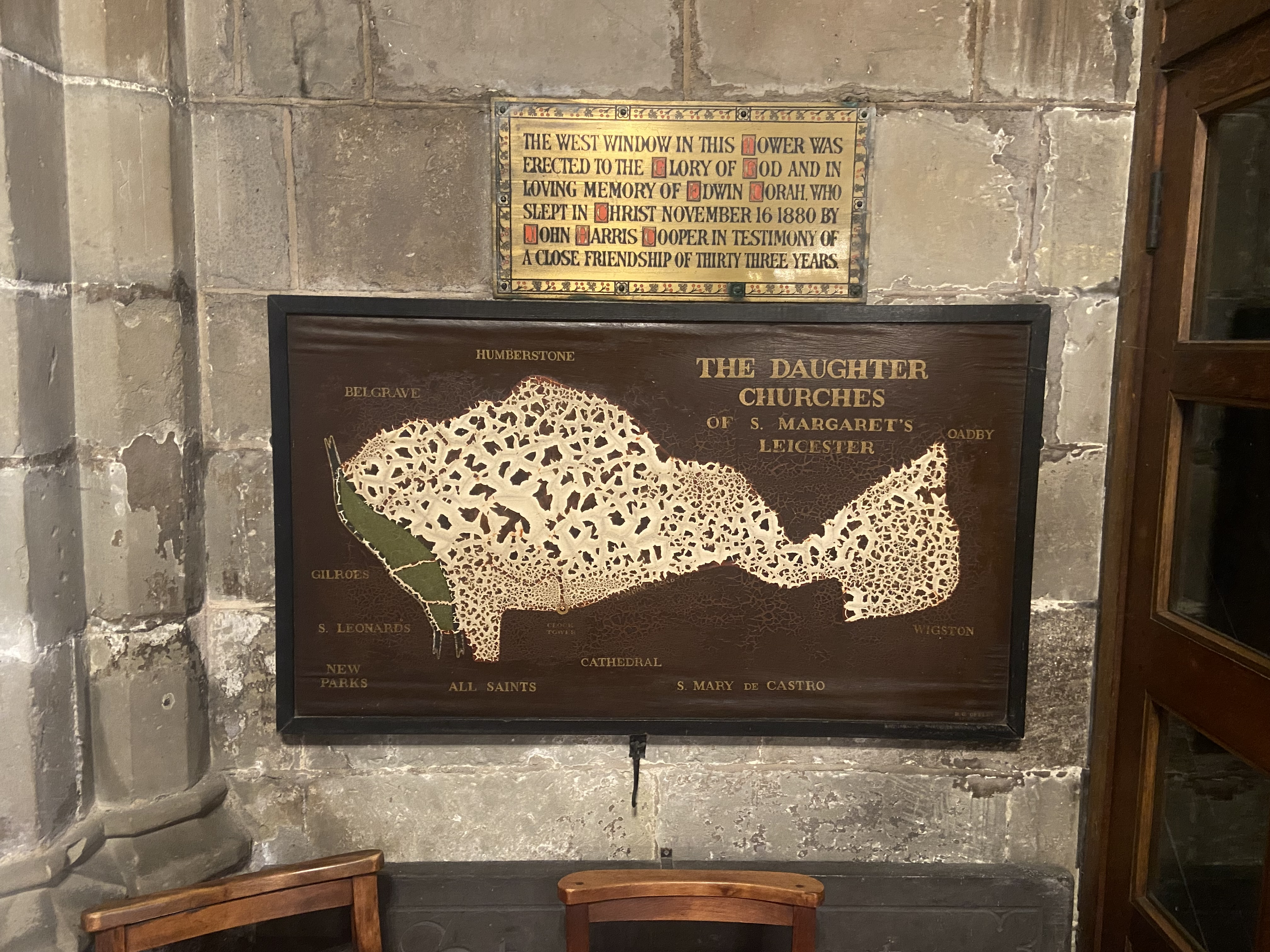
St Margaret's parish boundaries until the 19th century, contiguous with the Bishops Fee estate

The historic parish boundaries (and those of the later Prebend) were identical to the boundaries of the Bishops Fee estate. At 2650 acres it was an unusually substantial parish by normal standards and truly vast when compared with the other parishes of the ancient borough of Leicester. They were constrained by the 130 acre limit of the old Roman walls and some of them amounted to just two or three acres. St Mary de Castro alone was an exception, with its parish covering the estates of Leicester Castle south of the town wall, now Leicester Royal Infirmary and Freemans Common. Before new parishes were carved out of the territory to serve growing 19th century suburbs, St Margaret's maintained a chapel of ease at Knighton, now Knighton's parish church of St Mary Magdalene. In addition to the many agricultural profits earned by the Bishop of Lincoln as feudal landlord, St Margaret's as parish church also had a large number of residents it could collect tithes from (Church tax) in the eastern and northern suburbs of Leicester.

==== Earliest known rectors ====
Ranulph was the parishes first recorded senior parish priest, or rector beginning in the year 1092. He held the post jointly with that of Archdeacon of Leicester, the first appointed to that now ancient office. The subsequent rectors of the 12th century tended to hold the post jointly with the archdeaconry and this practice would be continued when the rectory was combined with the office of a prebend in 1199. As a rector, it is probable he was assisted by a vicar, or several, although there is no formal record for the establishment of a permanent vicarage endowed with glebe land until the year 1276. There are several vicars on record prior to 1276 and they likely confirm the presence of many generations of assisting clergy stretching back at least to the time of the Norman reforms.

=== 12th century ===
In the 1100s the Norman reforms continued to make themselves felt in the Borough of Leicester and the Bishops Fee. The Earldom of Leicester was established in 1107 for Robert of the House of Beaumont and he was granted the estates south of the Borough and the freehold of most of the households within its walls. These reforms made themselves felt at St Margaret's in the form of a complete reconstruction of both the church building and the institutional structure of its benefice by the establishment of a prebend around 1199.

==== Church reconstruction ====
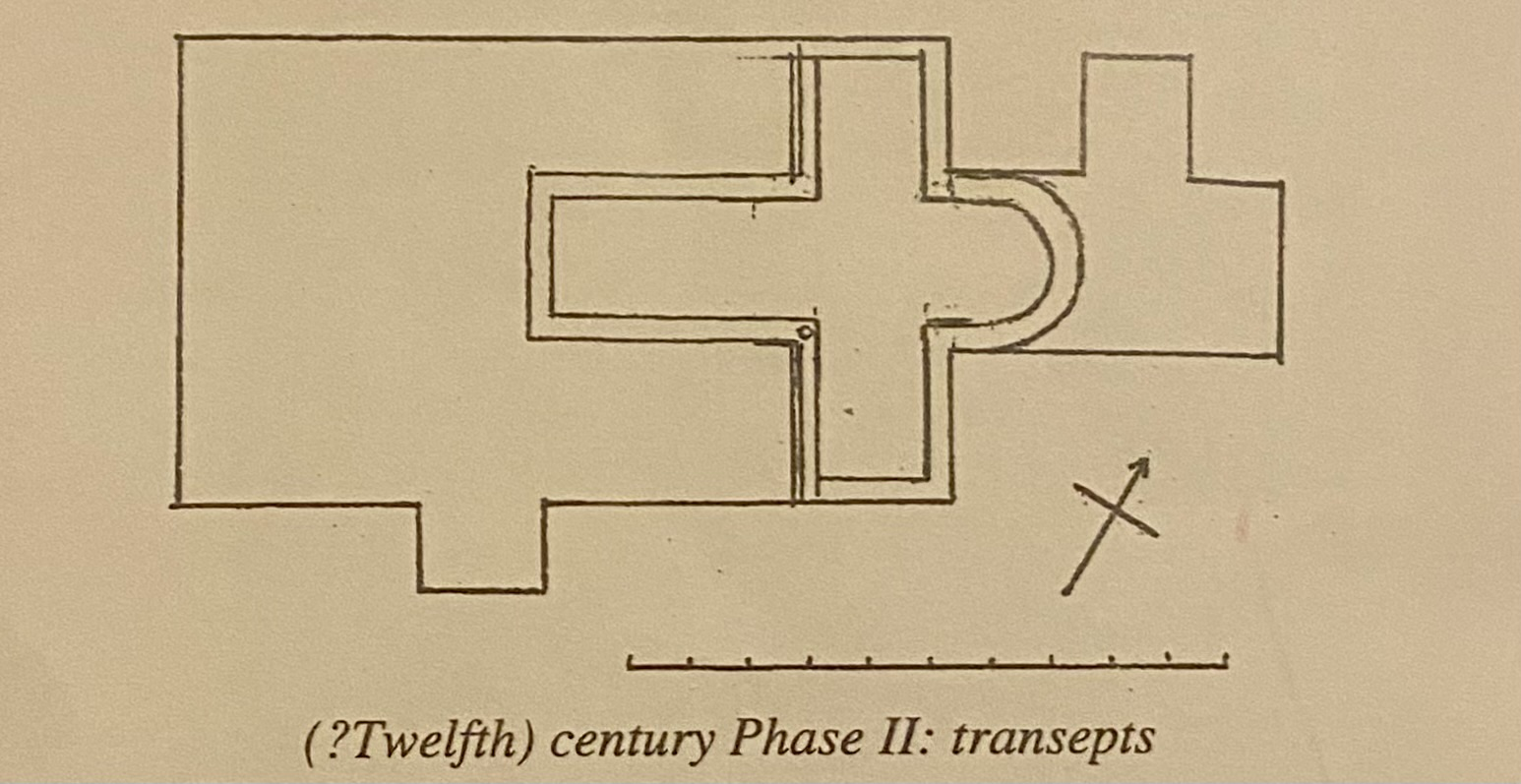
Hypothesised 12th century structure with 15th century structure overlaid

There is a longstanding tradition that one of the churches major reconstructions was commissioned by the 2nd Earl of Leicester Robert Le Bossu and there are indeed fragments of the modern structure around the east end of the south aisle which dating to his era. This incarnation of the church was probably constructed sometime before his death in 1168 or in its immediate aftermath as the result of a bequest. It probably represented an act of devotion to the mother church of Leicester since St Margaret's belonged to the bishops rather than to his own estate. The 12th century structure was cruciform and extended the nave to its current width. It was possibly centred around a crossing tower in a similar form to St Nicholas but more likely lacked a central tower, bearing more resemblance to St Nicholas, Worth. Only the masonry of the easternmost arcade of the nave and south aisle now survives of this structure.

It is possible that at least a south aisle, and possibly a north one too, were added sometime during the later 1100s. This would explain the odd double capital of the transept pillars in the easternmost bay of the nave, where the originally shorter south arcade was heightened during later 13th-century reconstructions. The northern arcades parallel moulding is clearly a careful imitation of the southern pier by later builders.

==== Prebend established ====
At the very end of the 12th century, in 1199, St Margaret's parish was made a prebend, a kind of parish whose principal cleric is a prebendary. A prebendary is a senior clergyman in a cathedral, serving a similar role to that of a canon, but with additional responsibilities across their diocese and patronage one of its more important churches. The bishop granted the parishes advowson directly to the prebendary who would appoint the vicar themselves and act in stead of all other diocesan authority for the parish. Historically prebendaries were recipients of a particularly generous kind of stipend (like the parish called a prebend too) drawn from the profits of a large parochial estate. The office was designed as a means of attracting young aristocrats to ministry in the church. Today these stipends have all been abolished and the role stripped to ceremonial status, in St Margaret's case abolished altogether. The prebendary's role away from the cathedral included complete oversight of his churches benefice with responsibility only to the bishop. This granted significantly more independence than the position of rector, who reports to the intermediary archdeacon, or vicar who used to report to a rector above them. In the cathedral prebendaries acted as a voting member of chapter and as a secular canon in choir. The prebendary was provided with a substantial clergy house in both of these locations. Such prebendal houses can still be seen in the grounds of Southwell Minster in Nottinghamshire today. In both locations the prebendary would be assisted by secondary clergy, a choral vicar in the cathedral and a vicar in their prebend. As such the post could be treated as a sinecure by the unscrupulous and absenteeism was the norm.

Being made a prebend meant substantial independence for St Margaret's and thus consolidated its significance. When a parish was made a prebend it gave it an unusual degree of freedom known as peculiar status. This included total independence from the Archdeaconry of Leicester and all other diocesan authority placing it under the direct supervision of a prebendary who reported to the bishop personally. It also gave St Margaret's a special relationship with Lincoln Cathedral, a kind of local link for Leicestershire parishes to their diocesan cathedral and a symbol of Lincoln's authority.

==== The prebendal court ====
Because the intermediary authority of the archdeacon had no baring in a prebend, St Margaret's was granted its own church court to act in place of the Court of the Archdeacon. Like all local church courts it was the court of first appeal for all matters touching ecclesiastical law. It would survive in some form until the 1950s, even after the prebend was abolished in 1880. A consequence of the unusual situation at St Margaret's, where both the church and the manorial estate were under the Bishop of Lincoln, was that both ordinary feudal justice in the Bishops Fee and ecclesiastical disputes in its church courts were under church control. In the 18th and 19th centuries this meant that responsibility for the development of modern paving, sewage processing, poverty relief, provision for abandoned children, and many other basic services would fall to St Margaret's prebend and its Vestry Committee.

==== William of Blois ====
The first name recorded as holding the prebend of St Margaret's was William of Blois, the Precentor of Lincoln Cathedral at the time of his appointment and Bishop of Lincoln three years later. It is likely that his relationship with St Margaret's was mostly financial. Like many of his successors he spent very little time in his prebend, deputing all ministry to his deputies probably only visiting to chair some sessions of the prebendal court.

=== 13th century ===
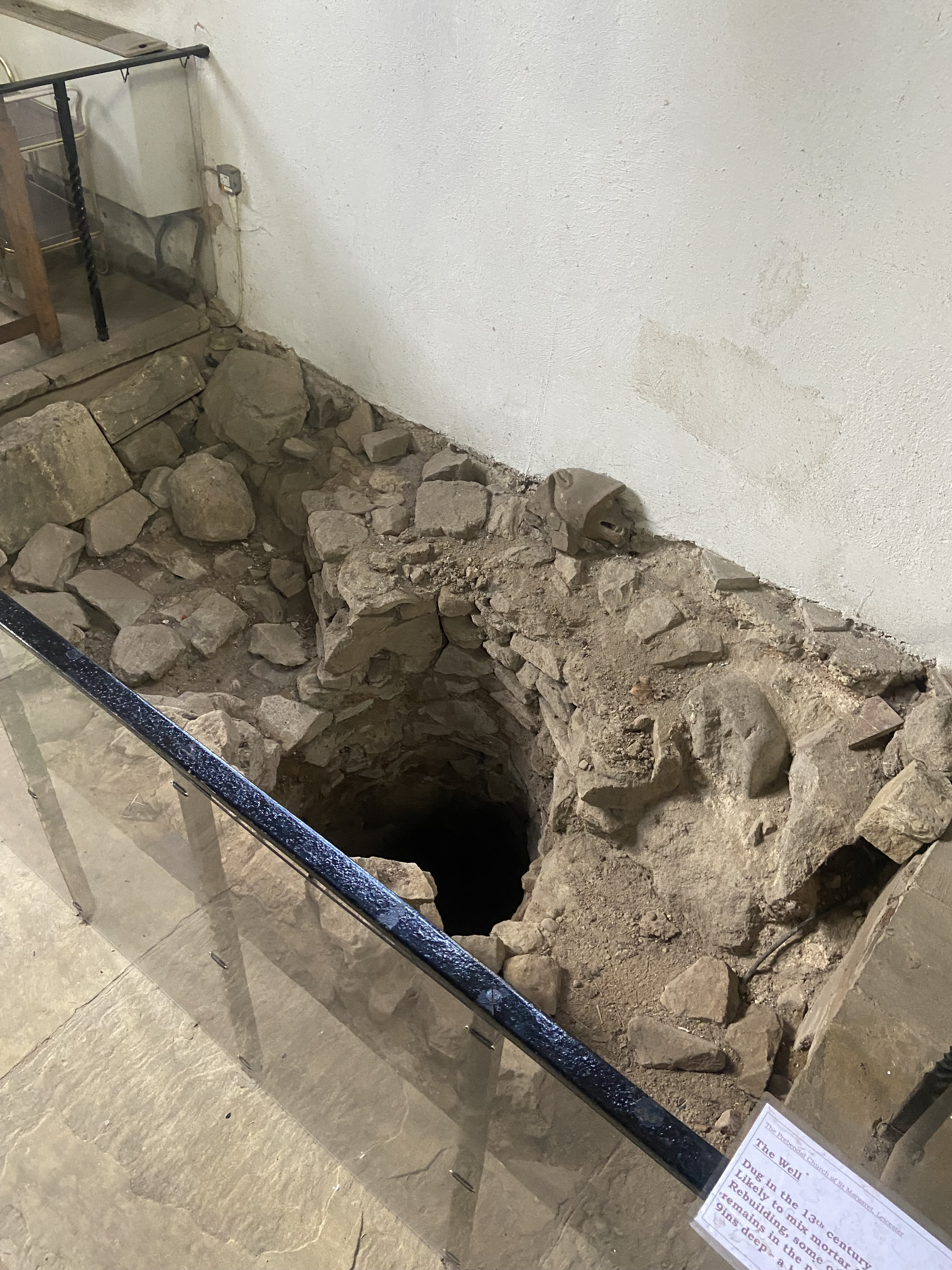
The 13th century well excavated in the north aisle.

The 1200s saw the status and significance of the prebend increase, the tenure of Robert Grosseteste, St Margaret's most notable cleric, and the construction of many structural elements that survive in the modern building. It was a period of relative economic prosperity and population growth. The wool trade proved especially successful in these years, and in 1269 the Borough of Leicester was recorded as the 13th richest of the borough's of England. The churches growing status and the growth of wealth and population does much to explain the monumental scale of the building works initiated in this century.

==== Jocelin of Wells ====
In 1205 Jocelin of Wells was appointed to the prebendary for just one year until he was elevated to Bishop of Bath and Wells in 1206. A notable challenger of the autocratic tendencies of King John, his name appeared in Magna Carta. He was likely an entirely absent appointee with respect to St Margaret's.

==== Robert Grosseteste ====
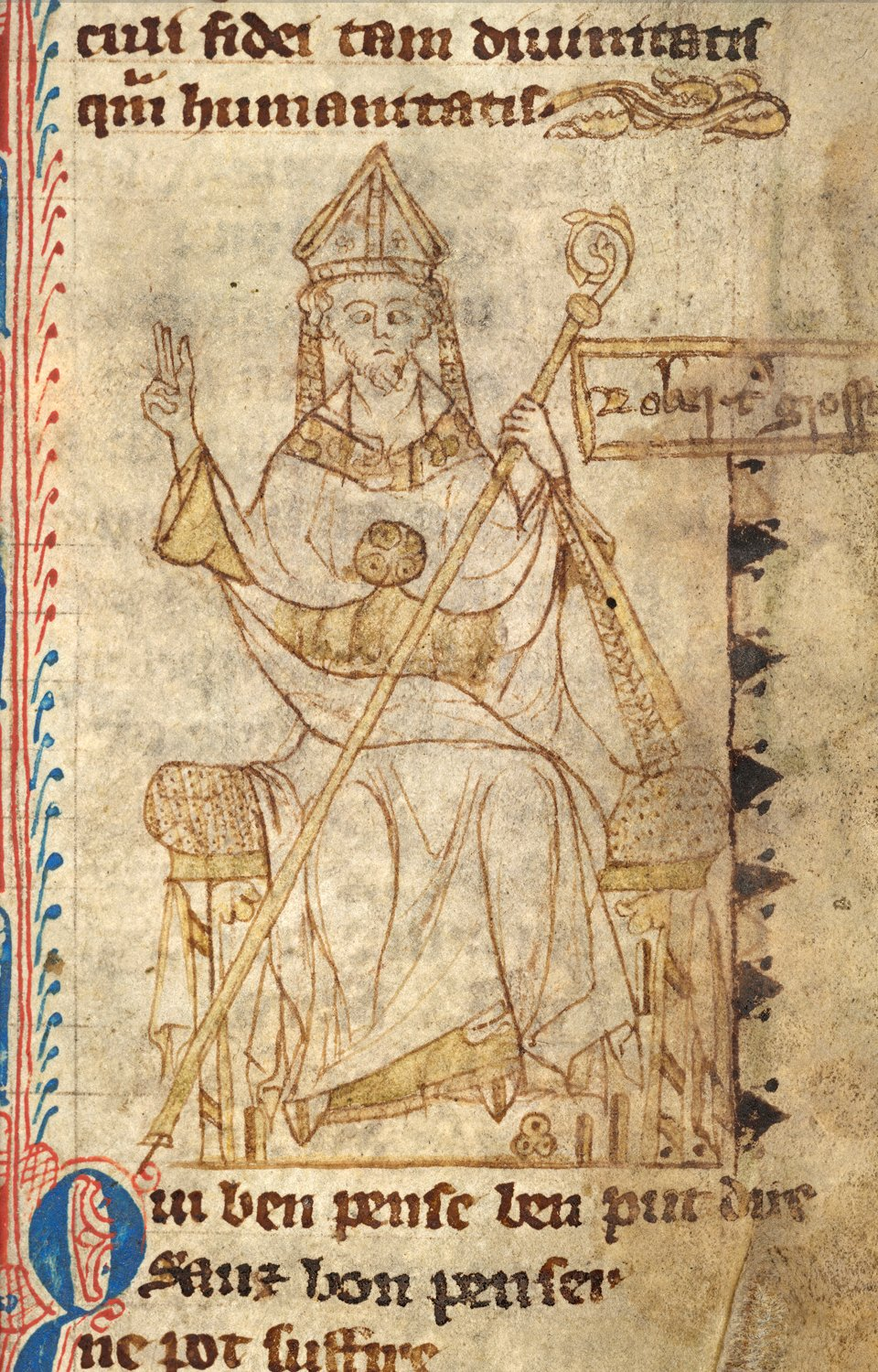
Drawing of Grosseteste in an illuminated manuscript.

Robert Grosseteste was first appointed a vicar of St Margaret's in 1225. Later granted the prebend jointly with the Archdeaconry of Leicester in 1229 and held the archdeaconry until 1232, when health problems made him resign, retaining the prebend until 1235 when he was made the Bishop of Lincoln. Grosetteste was one of the most significant scholars, philosophers, theologians of the Middle Ages and one of the foremost churchmen in English history. He is most noted today for his scientific writings, such as De Sphera, De Iride, De Color, and De Accessu et Recessu Maris his works on astronomy, the rainbow, colour, and the tides, and above all for De Lineis, Angulis et Figuris, a radical early apology for scientific demonstration, and De Luce, a work on light digressing into what is considered the most original work of cosmogony in the Latin literary tradition. These scientific treatises were mostly composed between 1220 and 1235, the latter ten years of which he was he was in receipt of various successive stipends at St Margaret's. While largely an absentee cleric with regard to St Margaret's as both vicar and prebendary, taken up with teaching at Oxford and presumably delegating local curates to carry out his ministry as vicar, he must have made occasional visitations and it is suggested that the reconstruction works of the 1230s were undertaken at his instigation.

==== 13th cent reconstruction ====
Sometime in the early the aisles were widened out to the ends of the 12th century transepts, their current width. The south door and the south arcades of the nave date to this period. It is also considered that the jambs of the south door and the door itself, including its sanctuary knocker, date to this phase of construction. The excavated well at the east end of the north aisle also dates to this period and was probable used during the construction process. This theory is founded on the fact that the refuse used to fill in the well dates to the early 13th century. The arcade of the south aisle bears a number of remarkable naturalistic decorative carvings most likely dating to this stage of construction. Appropriate to the status of the south aisle as a Lady Chapel, a dedication that continues until today, these are carvings of lily's and roses, motifs associated with the Blessed Virgin Mary who is often referred to by the title Rosa Mystica.

==== Vicarage established ====
1277 saw the foundation, or probable refoundation, of a vicarage stipend drawn from the "lesser tithes" of the Bishops Fee. After this time a seemingly consecutive list of incumbents survives. However, there are scattered mentions of Vicars of St Margaret's as early as 1225, the first name recorded being that of Robert Grosseteste. Roughly a hundred acres of the Bishops Fee was set aside as glebe land to maintain the vicars living, an unusually large area reflecting the size of the parish and possibly intended to support a number of other subsidiary curates and perhaps a choral college. A vicarage building was also constructed and subsequently reconstructed several times on various locations to the south of the church. For a list of the Vicars of St Margaret's see below.

=== 14th century ===
In the 1300s the laity of St Margaret's in the east and north suburbs and the rural population underwent a severe catastrophe together with the rest of England and Europe with many complicated religious outcomes. The century was dominated by the events of the Black Death which hit the parish in 1349. 700 deaths in the St Margaret's benefice were recorded by the chronicler of Leicester Abbey. It proved to be a complete reset for the life of the local worshiping community, necessitating the reestablishment of traditional lay church life and sparking a commonplace appetite for radical reforming ideas. The former was realised by the establishment of the Guild of St Mary and St Katherine and the second by a radical reforming group in Belgrave Gate in the Bishops Fee known as Lollards.

==== The Black Death ====
The Black Death of 1349 ravaged the parish of St Margaret according to contemporary chronicler Henry of Knighton, himself born in the Knighton chapelry dependent on St Margaret's and a canon regular of the neighbouring Leicester Abbey. His account reports a shocking number of fatalities:

“The dreadful pestilence penetrated the sea coast by Southampton and came to Bristol, and there almost the whole population of the town perished, as if it had been seized by sudden death; for few kept their beds more than two or three days, or even half a day. Then this cruel death spread everywhere around, following the course of the sun. And there died at Leicester in the small parish of St Leonard’s more than 380 persons; in the parish of St Martin’s, 400; in the parish of St Margaret's, 700; and so in every parish, a very great multitude.”

While not necessarily a precise or accurate report of the number of dead, Henry's account shows the deep psychological impact of the plague on its observers and the comparatively high death rates in Leicester's extramural parishes, St Margaret's and St Leonard's.

==== Guilds ====
Like most pre-reformation churches in England the life of the laity at St Margaret's was focused on the parish guilds. At St Margaret's, the wealthiest of the two principle guilds was dedicated to the Blessed Virgin Mary and Katherine of Alexandria, like Margaret a virgin martyr and the patron of the nearby St Katherine's Priory perhaps suggesting an Augustinian connection. Founded in 1355 it was probably a replacement to an older guild or guilds which died through reduction of membership during the plague. The purpose of the institution was provision for a good burial and proper chantry commemorations for its dead members, a mutual aid society for its living members, a social club, and a devotional religious society. Initially founded with the modest intention of finding two priests to say mass just twice a year for the souls of its departed members, the Guild of St Katherine soon grew wealthy enough to maintain an altar in the parish church (probably in the north aisle), a large communal guild hall on the east side of Church Gate, and two full time chaplains on a generous stipend of £10. 13s. 4d. per annum (roughly £3,000 today). At the time of the dissolution of guilds it had assets of £20. 10s. 1.5d. (roughly £5,600 today) and made a profit of nearly £7 per annum. When the guild was dissolved the land was divided between Edward Pease and James Wylson and part, at least, of the land to Robert Catlyn. Today a remnant of the Guild of St Katherine is still visible in the church in the form of a large wooden chest bearing the distinctive wheel emblem of Katherine of Alexandria.

St Katherine's was not the only guild. The patronal guild, the Guild of St Margaret, was first recorded in 1392 and Nichols preserves some of its records in quotations.

==== Lollardy in the prebend ====
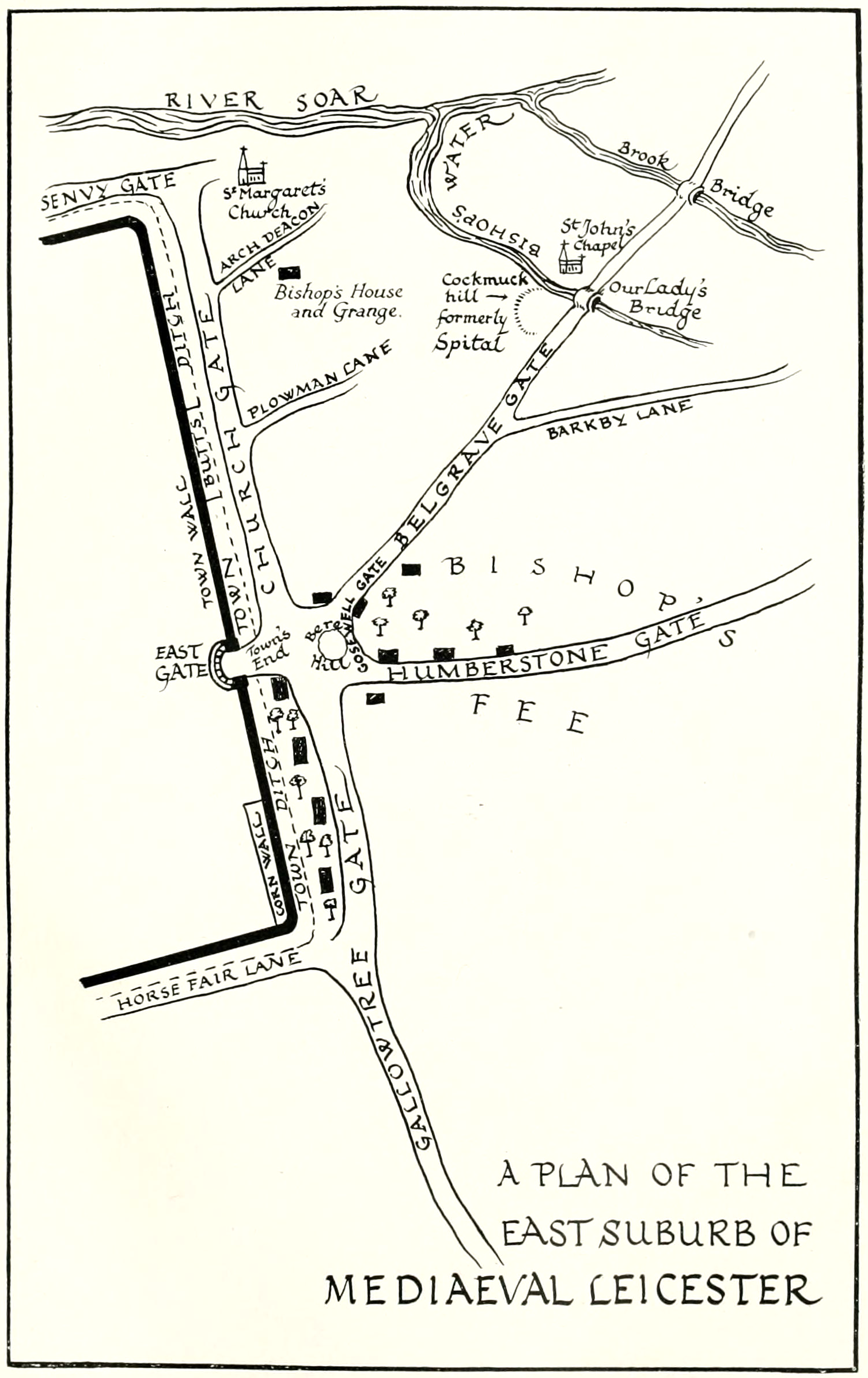
The east suburb of Leicester in the Middle Ages. Both the church and St John's Hospital where Lollardy would flourish in the 1380s are shown.

In the early 1380s Leicester became a center of Lollardy, a religious movement that sprang from the teachings of John Wycliffe. Its base in the town was the chapel of the small hospital of St John on Belgrave Gate within the Bishop's Fee. The movement's popularity reached a head on March 23, 1382 (Palm Sunday) when William Swinderby, a local priest, hermit, and Lollard, was permitted to preach in the presence of John Stafford, the Mayor of Leicester. Henry of Knighton the chronicler of Leicester Abbey remarked around this time that every second man had become a Lollard.

The reaction from authorities was initially fairly slow because of Lollard sympathisers like Gaunt in the hierarchy. However, in 1389 there is a record that William Swinderby was required to undertake an extensive preaching tour proclaiming his recantation wherever he had spread his former errors. One of the churches he was required to visit was St Margaret's.

Later in October and November 1389 a full inquisition was undertaken in the borough of Leicester and the Bishops Fee suburbs by the Archbishop of Canterbury William Courtenay. The burghers Roger Dexter, Nicholas Taylor, Richard Wagstaff, Michael Scrivener, William Smith, John Henry, William Parchmeanar, and Roger Goldsmith also summonsed for inquisition but failed to appear. As a result, Courtney, with an unusual severity, excommunicated the burghers in a solemn ceremony taking place on All Souls Day (Nov 2nd 1389) headed by the Archbishop of Canterbury himself at the Abbey and repeated by the local clergy in all the towns parish churches including St Margaret's. He also placed the town and its suburbs under interdict, i.e. prevented from participating in the sacraments, such that reception of Holy Communion, hearing of confessions, baptism of children by clergy, and marriage were all prohibited for townsfolk until the culprits were produced. This remained in place from November 2 to November 17, 1389, until the discovery and recantation of the culprits.

Although no deaths resulted, this episode must have left a powerful impression on all citizens and may have actually strengthened the Lollard cause and the Fire and Faggot Parliament held at Leicester Greyfriars in 1414 is perhaps testament that the tradition was feared to linger in the city.

=== 15th century ===
The 1400s saw the prebend begin to fully recover from the Black Death. The most significant reconstruction of the Prebendal Church in its history was initiated in the middle of the century (1444). The Lollardy presence in Leicester continued too in the early part of the century with rebels from Leicester, very possibly including some from the Bishops Fee, participating in the Oldcastle Revolt of 1414. Leicester was also the scene for the authorities legislative response, with the second parliament of Henry V's reign, known ominously as the Fire and Faggot Parliament, held at Leicester Greyfriars later the same year. It has been speculated that the monumental reconstruction of St Margaret's in this century likewise represents an architectural response to the problem of religious dissent on the part of Roman Catholic authorities.

==== 15th century rebuild ====
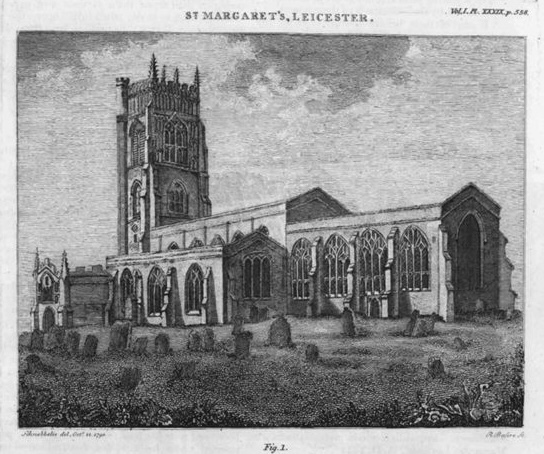
View of the church from the south east engraved in the late 18th century, largely as it would have appeared after the project was completed and how it still appears today.

The following note in the Registers of the Bishops of Lincoln from William Alnwick's time is usually considered to be evidence of the beginning of the project:

“Commission of the Lord Bishop to levy the Smoke-farthing, alias called the Lincoln farthing, from our archdeacons, our subjects, for the benefit of our mother church of Lincoln Cathedral, our spouse, to convert the smoke farthings, to be granted for the construction of the bell tower of the prebendary church of St. Margaret, Leicester, A.D. 1444. (Note: Commissio domini episcpi ad levandum le Smoke-farthen, alias dict' Lincoln farthing, à nostris archidiaconatus nostri subditis, ad utilitatem nostre matricis ecclesie Lincolnie cathedrelis, sponse nostre, convertendum diet’ smoke farthings, concedentur ad constructionem campanilis ecclesie prebendalis Sancte Margarete, Leycestr’ A.D. 1444.)

It is quite likely that the project took place in stages over many decades and it has been suggested that Thomas Wolsey's visitation in 1508 was the moment completion was finally celebrated, 64 years after construction began. The works, which included substantial reconstruction of almost all elements of the existing building, include the clerestories of the nave, the church domineering 33 meter high tower, its magnificent vaulted south porch, and its broad four bayed chancel, the baptismal font at the west end of the south aisle. These elements all demonstrate the extremely high quality of construction and the ambitious nature of the project. The project was funded by means of a secular tax levied by the Bishop of Lincoln in his role as the feudal lord. Known as the "smoke farthing tax" it was linked to the number of fireplaces in a citizens home. It draw more income from the richer members of the Bishops Fee community as they naturally had more hearths in their homes.

The elements dated to this period are so monumental that two key details can be easily overlooked. The first is the large number of fine stone carvings, especially on the exterior, in the south porch, and in the chancel. Amid the Christian imagery of what is either the Pie Pilicane or the dove of the Holy Spirit over the entrance to the south porch there are also many elements of naturalistic imagery now more associated with paganism. For instance there is an abundance of green man details on the walls of the sanctuary around the high altar, the holiest site in the church. They are in fact probably symbolic of spring, Easter, and the resurrection in the minds of the clergy who commissioned them.

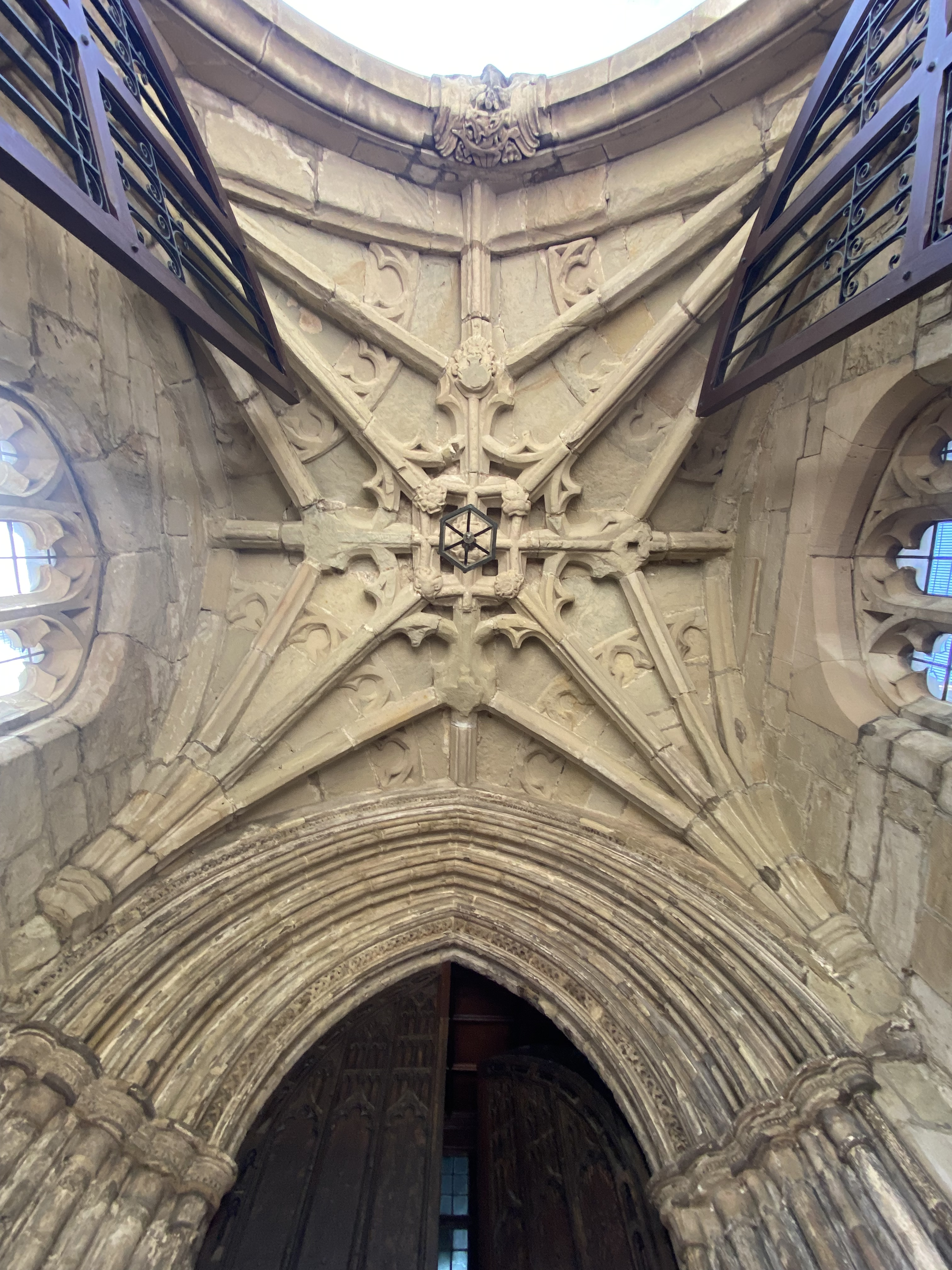
The south porches tierceron vault dating to the 15th century rebuild.

The second easily overlooked element is the conscious inclusion of features germane to the celebration of the major festivals of Whit Monday and the Assumption. The monumental west door which faces the Sanvey Gate procession route, the Holy Ghost hole in the tower vault, the monumental south porch either for clerical processions from the now lost choir school and clergy houses or for the procession of the laity from the church to the churchyard where festivities were held. The size of the church and its churchyard, the largest in Leicester Old Town, also perhaps point to the at least thousand strong crowds that must have flocked to the church on Whit Monday as well as the large populations in the northern and eastern suburbs.

=== Early 16th cent ===
The early years of the 1500s saw the hay days of the medieval Church of St Margaret just prior to the waves of vandalism effected by the English Reformation. The building works initiated in 1444 were completed, the famous Cardinal Wolsey visited the church in 1508, and John Penny the former Abbot of Leicester, later bishop of Bishop of Carlisle, was buried in the church. It was also the final period before the reformation when Roman Catholic culture thrived. The borough more generally was a thriving centre of cutting-edge music, the home of noted composer Hugh Aston, and St Margaret's choristers had a role in this.

==== Wolsey’s visit ====
Around 1508 or maybe 1509, Thomas Wolsey apparently visited the church to preach on the occasion of its completion. Wolsey was then Dean of Lincoln but soon became Bishop of Lincoln, later Archbishop of York, a Cardinal of Santa Cecilia in Trastevere, and Lord Chancellor to Henry VIII. According to a slightly dubious source known as 'Barrows Chronology', when "the great fair new Prebendal Church of St Margaret was well neigh finished" Wolsey came "with many servants and horsemen to Leicester" and preached in the church on Whit Sunday (or perhaps Monday, presumably as part of the annual festivities) before leaving for Leicester Abbey accompanied by "the ringing of bells and the acclamation of much people from all parts."

==== John Penny jnr & snr ====
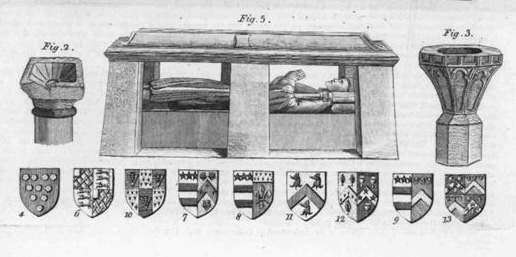
Tomb of John Penny, an engraving from John Nichols History and Antiquities showing the arrangement prior to Victorian restoration.

The names of two John Penny's have been associated with St Margaret's, the elder in the latter decades of the 1400s also recorded as Mayor of Leicester for the term 1481-1482 and the younger a former Abbot of Leicester and Bishop whose splendid alabaster effigy rests in the church. For many years it was considered that Penny's tomb, in the chancel on the north side of the high altar, was placed in St Margaret's after the demolition of Leicester Abbey. However, thanks to research by the historian Dr Ernest Morris, Verger of the church in the mid 20th century and Tower Master until his death in 1962, we now know that the elder John Penny, the mayor of 1481–2, was also buried in the newly constructed church. Likely because of this, John Penny Jnr personally requested to be buried near loved ones rather than in his splendid abbatial church across the River Soar or in either of his two cathedral churches at Bangor and Carlyle.

==== John Lelands description ====
In the year 1538, four years after the reformation began with the 1534 Act of Supremacy, John Leland, official antiquarian to Henry VIII, visited Leicester and recorded his impressions of its churches including St Margaret's.

“St Margarete's is thereby the fairest paroche chirch of Leircester, wher ons was a cathedrale chirch, and thereby the Bisshop of Lincoln had a palace, whereof a little yet standith. John Peny, first Abbate of Leircester then Bisshop of Bangor Cairluel is here buried in an alabaster tumbe. This Peny made the new bricke worke in Leircester Abbay, and much of the bricke waulles."

There are many problems with Leland's survey, clearly rushed in all its details save its account of the Church of Our Lady of the Annunciation in the Newarke, home of numerous tombs of Henry's mothers royal ancestors. Among his dubious claims are those about ruinous bishops palace he mentions adjacent to St Margaret's. It was probably nothing of the sort since the Bishop of Lincoln usually stayed at Lyddington Palace in Rutland when transacting business in Leicester and is never once recorded as staying in the borough. It was possibly the remains of a grange recorded as the "curia" in 1205, the manorial and ecclesiastical administrative seat of the Prebendary of Leicester in the Bishops Fee. Alternatively it may have been an abandoned vicarage later restored by John Lounde in the 1560s or the residence of a small college of priests or choristers. Whatever its function this ruin stood on the land to the south of the church in the area occupied by the later vicarage. Today it is site of the stairway leading to St Margaret's Underpass south of the churchyard. In spite of his many dubious claims Leyland is an important witness to the state of religious architecture in Leicester in the 1530s before the full effects of reformation were felt.

=== St Margaret's before the reformation ===
==== Lost imagery, rood screen, and altars ====
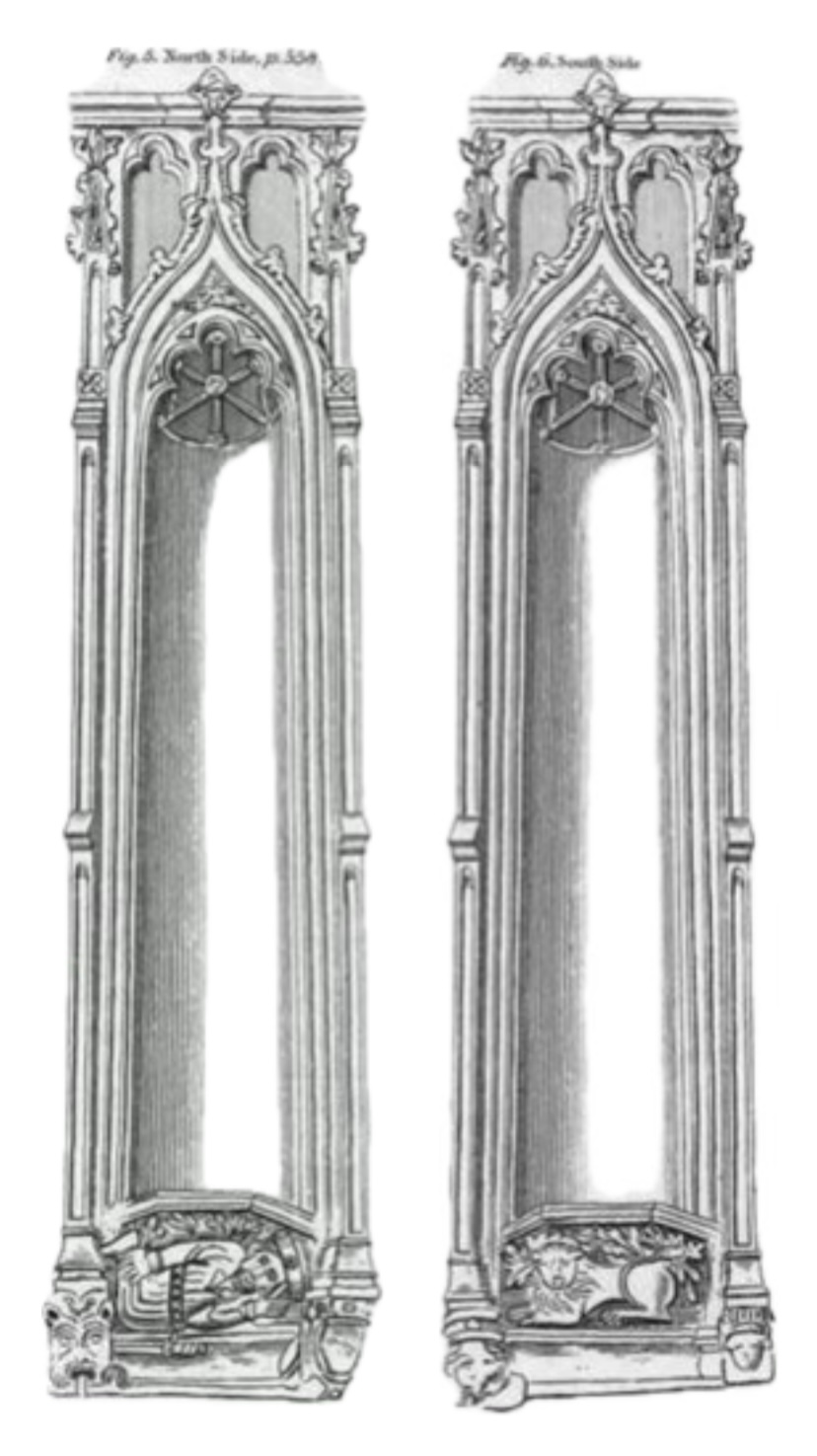
Engravings of the two 15th century niches in the chancel east wall.

Like all pre-reformation English churches, St Margaret's interior would have been focused on a series of stone altars, dominated by a vast rood screen hiding the chancel, and its walls would have abounded with wall paintings showing the lives of Christ and His saints. Surviving examples for comparison include the Pickering Wall Paintings or the more local Lutterworth Wall Paintings, Raunds Wall Paintings, and the Coventry Doom Painting. These were all whitewashed during the Edwardian Reformation of the 1540s. A tiny number of carvings still retain traces of paint in the chancel. All of the walls were sadly scraped and re-plastered during excessive restoration in the 19th century, at which point all murals still surviving under whitewash were lost. The statues, which survived until the 1560s, were removed in 1568 by Prebendary John Launde. The location of these can still be seen around the south porch and west front and in the chancel where they have been replaced in the 20th century.

==== The Whit Monday procession ====
As Leicester's mother church St Margaret's was the destination of a procession undertaken by parishioners of all the boroughs other churches on the moveable feast of Whit Monday, occurring on a Monday falling between May 11 and June 14. The Whit Monday procession was especially significant because processions on this day were widely undertaken by groups of parishes to the church they considered to be the oldest or most significant in their area, known as the mother church. This was part of the theme of the "churches birthday" that developed surrounding the Feast of Pentecost and its octave week, the annual commemoration of God the Holy Spirit. There are records of similar pilgrimages taking place at St Mary in Arden in Market Harborough and in communities up and down the country with numerous 19th-century revivals known as Whit walks. The festivities in Leicester began with several simultaneous processions beginning from the various parish churches. Each procession was highly symbolic and many of the parishioners dressed as notable saints. As Dr Graham Jones, a former churchwarden, noted in his guidebook to St Margaret's:

“The procession began at St Mary de Castro, with an image of the Virgin Mary under a canopy carried aloft by four persons and accompanied by musicians, twelve men representing the apostles (whose names were written on pieces of paper and attached to their caps), fourteen people carrying banners, and the people of the parish led by the young unmarried women representing the various virgin martyrs. A similar procession made its way from St Martins church (now Leicester Cathedral), with a statue of St Martins and similar groups of apostles and virgins, but it is said without a canopy for the saint or music.

Other processions would have included those from St Nicholas, the monastic houses of Greyfriars and Austin Friars, and the congregation of the lost church of St Peter converging on the High Cross. The united procession then proceeded north up High Cross Street picking up the congregation of All Saints and probably the Dominican Friars from St Clement's Priory (Blackfriars) and continuing down Sanvey Gate (Sacra Via Gata or Holy Way Road) through the west large ceremonial west door of the tower. This splendid door, the enormous height of the tower, and the procession route are all surviving clues to this ancient tradition. There is also a large trapdoor in the summit of the tower vault over the door on the inside of the church which possibly had a ritual function in the events.

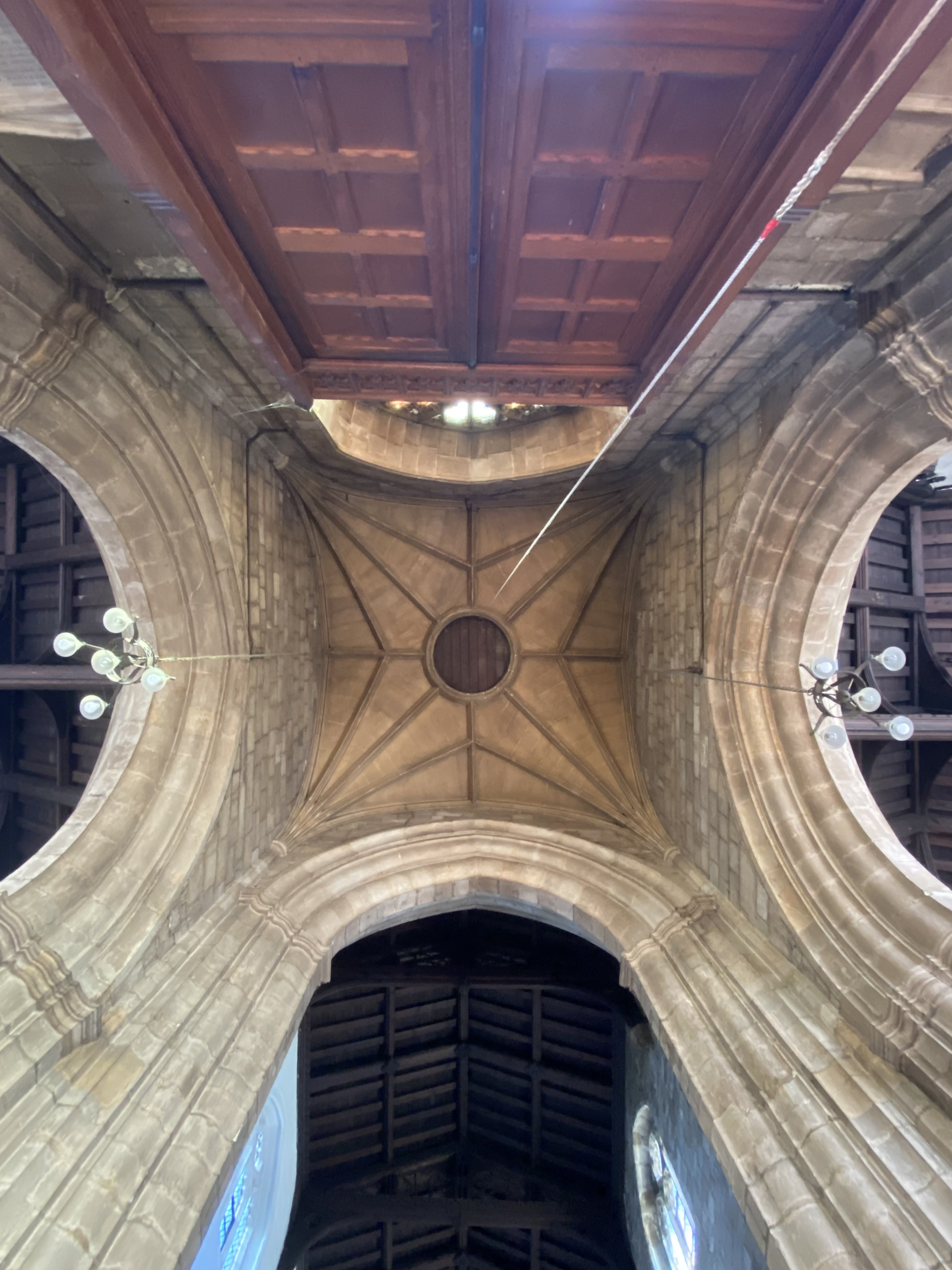
Tower vault with Holy Ghost hole over where the pilgrims entered on Whit Monday

The Whit Monday festivities were concluded by a major church ale held as a common celebration of all the parishes. The church ale was essentially a large fair or party held in the grounds of St Margaret's and was one of several held across the summer months (see below). There are accounts from other parishes in the borough of expenses paid for the Whit Monday feast. In the year 1493 3s. 4d. (roughly £111 today) was paid by the parish of St Mary de Castro for "bread, flesh, and ale." The same parish provided "half a calf, three calves heads, and two plucks" in 1505. Likewise on the records of St Martin's parish we find 18d. (roughly £20 today) for cakes in 1555 during the brief Marian restoration.

==== Other major feasts and church ales ====
The Feast of the Assumption was the other major occasion in the annual pre-reformation calendar of St Margaret's (August 15). As with Whit Monday this festival was marked at St Margaret's by an unusually large church ale held over two days, the Sunday falling before the Feast of the Assumption (15 August) itself, as well as by the customary liturgical functions of the Sunday and the feast day. In the year 1498 the Assumptiontide ales managed to raise just over £1 (roughly £665 today). They proved so successful that the parish began to hold another ale a few days later, on the eve of St Bartholomew's Day (23 August). In 1498 this St Bartholomew ale raised 38s. (£1,260 today) with an outlay of just 10 pence on bread and cheese, the eves of feasts always being fasting days and therefore cheaper to provide for.

==== Devotion to the Virgin Mary ====
The cult of the Virgin Mary was by far the most popular that developed at St Margaret's during the Middle Ages. This devotion is partly explained by the widespread preeminence of the Virgin's cult across medieval Leicester, with no fewer than three churches, St Mary de Castro, St Mary of the Newark dedicated to the Annunciation, and Leicester Abbey named Our Lady of the Meadows and dedicated to the Assumption. However, at St Margaret's the cult of Our Lady of Lincoln, a part of the link between the Prebend and Lincoln Cathedral specifically played a major role. It started early and 13th century carvings of the lily and the rose, flowers associated with the Virgin, survive on the south arcade of the nave and in the south aisle. The south aisle was a Lady Chapel probably since its first construction. The Assumption was an especially prominent devotion and it is quite likely that the tower trapdoor (the Holy Ghost hole) was used as a means of reenacting the assumption with a statue during the drama of the Whit Monday procession, perhaps on the Feast of the Assumption too. It bears a strong resemblance to a similar feature in the vaults of Lincoln Cathedral, where the Assumption was celebrated with great solemnity.

Two elements of Marian devotion survived the reformation, aside from the carvings in the south aisle. The first is the dedication of the south aisle to the Virgin Mary, which dates to at least 1300 and continues to this day. The second is the blue cassocks historically worn by the choir. This custom originates at Lincoln Cathedral, so reflects both devotion to Our Lady of Lincoln and St Margaret's historic link to Lincoln as one of its Prebends. The practice of wearing blue cassocks is still maintained by both the choirs of St Margaret's and that of Lincoln Cathedral to this day and can be seen at every choral liturgy in the respective churches. This practice also spread to the parishes' daughter churches and can be seen in evidence today at St James the Greater on London Road too. Another less visible dimension of the blue theme is the colour of the sallies on the bell ropes in the tower. A reflection of the colours worn by the choir, it likewise echoes the connection to Lincoln and the pre-reform Marian cult of Lincoln. It is most likely that both customs are Victorian revivals.

=== The Reformation and Civil War at St Margaret’s ===
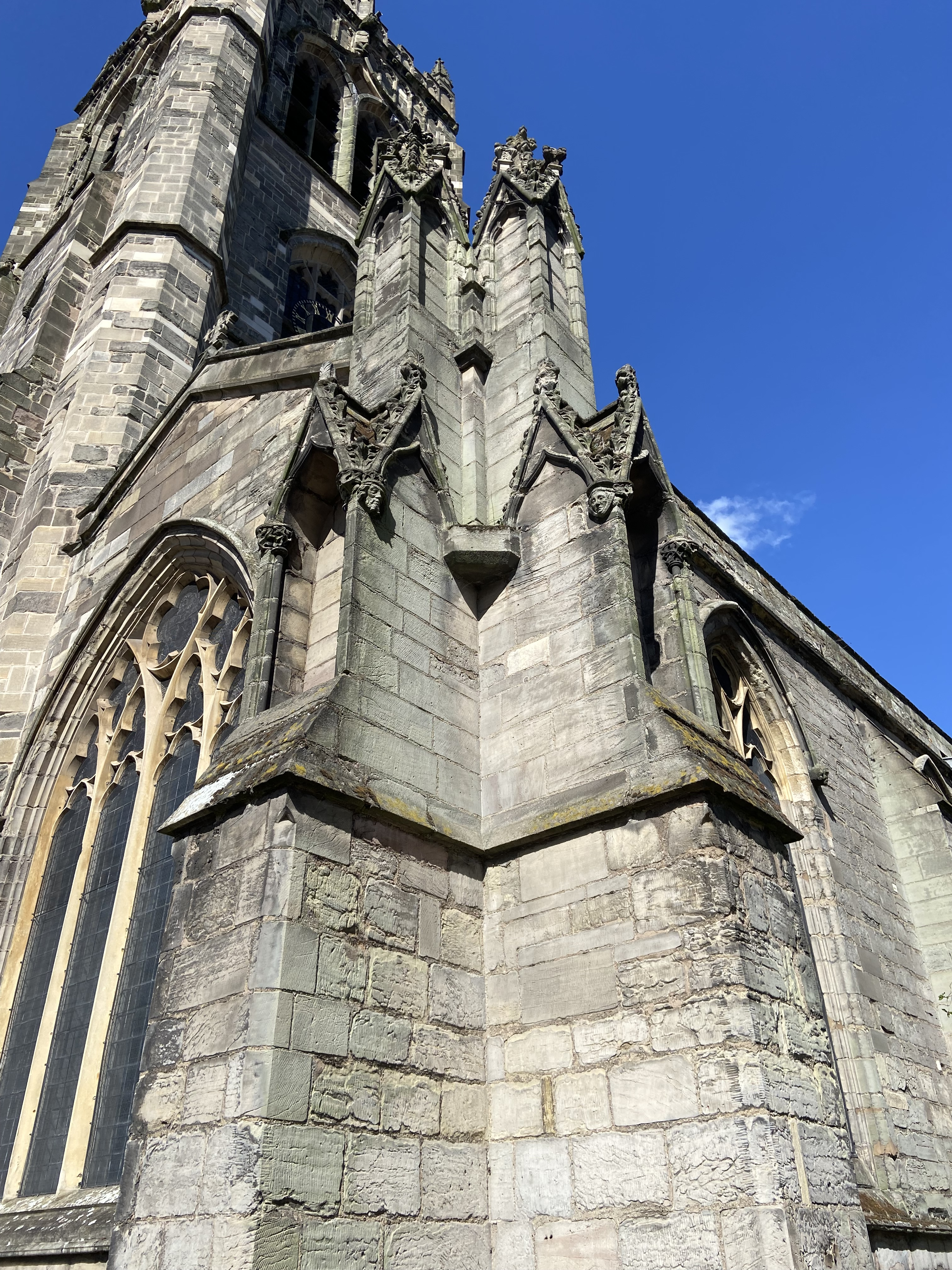
Niched pinnacle on the south west corner of the building stripped of its statues in the 1560s.

==== The Henrician Reformation ====
Warning signs of King Henry VIII's dissatisfaction with the Roman Catholic Church were felt in Leicester early on in November 1530. Wolsey, now Archbishop, Cardinal and Chancellor, returned to Leicester while on his journey to face execution in London. Sickening from dysentery, he died at Leicester Abbey, just over the River Soar from St Margaret's, on November 29 and was buried in its church. A reconstructed funeral monument commemorates what is thought to be the spot in the ruins on Abbey Park today. Henry's opposition to the Roman Pontiff reached a head in 1534. The First Act of Supremacy came into law that year formally ending Papal Supremacy over the Church of England and establishing Caesaropapism over the nations historic religious institutions. Beyond this legal change and the ecclesiological controversy it entailed, very little evidence could initially be seen of Henry's Reformation at the local level. At St Margaret's worship continued in Latin with most Catholic theological assumptions still in place.

The first visible local changes came in the form of the dissolution of all of Leicesters religious houses in 1538 as part of the Dissolution of the Monasteries. On November 10, the Abbot of the chapter of Leicester Abbey, the Guardian of Greyfriars (St Mary Magdalene Friary) and the Priors of both Blackfriars (St Clement's Priory), and Austin Friars (St Katherine's Priory) surrendered their houses without recorded protest. Its impact on the spiritual lives of the lay faithful of St Margaret's would have been very significant as many of them would have been tertiaries of the mendicant orders. Those less closely dedicated to the orders would also have felt their absence in the loss of confessors, regular traditional preaching, school teachers, and pastoral care providers. The propaganda surrounding the Dissolution promised the money generated would be spent on public works and charity, however most was absorbed by the state in London and by the aristocracy. Leicester was no exception to this rule.

Perhaps counterbalancing the nakedly corrupt Dissolution, a more positive impact came a year later in 1539 when the state legalised the English Bible when the publication and distribution of William Tyndale and Myles Coverdale's translation was authorised. Known as the Great Bible, it was placed in almost all local churches throughout England by around the year 1541. St Margaret's, being a partly urban benefice and one in which support for Lollardy and Wycliffe's earlier English Bible had flourished, was certainly one of the churches that would have kept a copy of the Great Bible. More vernacular would be introduced, this time directly into church services, particularly the Whit Procession, when Thomas Cranmer published his Exhortation and Litany in 1544. This was intended to strip festivals of what was perceived as dangerous superstition by the reformers, introducing a penitential and mournful character to the previously exuberant liturgy.

==== The Edwardian Reformation ====
In 1547, following the accession of the 9 year old Edward VI, St Margaret's significance underwent two huge blows. Firstly, the freehold of the Bishops Fee estate and the lordship of its manor were confiscated from the sitting prebendary and the Diocese of Lincoln. It passed into the Crown Estates before being sold to a series of aristocrats. These new secular lords of the manor would now be responsible for local petty secular law until the Civil War and the end of feudalism. Secondly, as a result of orders sent out by Thomas Cranmer, the practice of religious processions were banned entirely across the country. This put an end to an immemorial tradition of Whit Monday processions to St Margaret's and reduced its practical significance to parishioners of the other churches in the Borough of Leicester drastically.

In 1549 liturgical reform was initiated and the church service began to be said in English for the first time in all the services in Leicestershire churches thanks to the publication of the First Book of Common Prayer. This transformed the daily celebration of the Liturgy of the Hours in the churches of Leicester from the series of Latin chants morning and evening to the two daily English language services of Mattins and Evensong. The year 1549 also saw the passing of legislation that led to the destruction of much of St Margaret's art and decoration, the Putting away of Books and Images Act. This legislation ordered the destruction of statues, rood screens, Latin Missals and Breviaries, and sacred relics, as well as the whitewashing of wall paintings. These reforms must have had a profound emotional impact on worshippers, most of whom were probably dismayed.

In 1552 an intensified second phase of reform was initiated by the imposition of a Second Book of Common Prayer on England's parish churches implying more radically Protestant eucharistic theology. The stone altars of St Margaret's were torn down at this time and replaced with a wooden communion table as evidenced by the need of "stones to the altar" under the Marian restoration just a year later in 1553.

==== The Marian restoration ====
The restoration of traditional religion at St Margaret's is exceptionally well recorded. The church accounts for the year 1553 year record:

“mending the pyx… painting the altar cloths… repainting the rood… mending the canopy… making St John’s altar… making Our Lady's altar… (the purchase of) a cope… (the purchase of) stones to the altar… chains of censers… banner cloths… sewing, making, and painting 10 banner poles that Mr Conyesbie had…“

There are many other such entries. They record a hurried, but fairly complete, restoration of the altars and images in St Margaret's and the practice of the procession Whit procession (hence the banners). They also act as an effective witness to what was destroyed. The rood, first replaced with a temporary painting in 1553, was re-erected in 1555. Accounts also survive from 1555 from other parishes in the borough for foods purchased for the Whit ale at St Margaret's implying full restoration of the tradition of procession.

==== The trial of Thomas More ====
In 1556 Mary's Revival of the Heresy Acts claimed its only Leicester victim and the sentence of death was passed in St Margaret's. Dr John White, Bishop of Lincoln 1554–1556, undertook an inquisition in the city and one Thomas More was accused in the process (not to be confused with his more famous namesake Thomas More the scholar, lawyer, and Lord Chancellor). John Nichols preserves the Latin original of the trial record preserved in the Registers of the Diocese of Lincoln of which the following is a rough translation:

“Thomas More appeared before us, as usual, in the Parish Church of St. Martin in Leicester, and afterwards also in the Prebendal Church of St. Margaret, on the 21st of April 1556, and defended many heresies; saying among other things: “This is my faith, that in the Sacrament of the Altar is not the Body of Christ; no more than if I myself should give one piece of bread, and say, Take, eat, this is my body; meaning my own body within my doublet.” Hence a sentence was passed against him. It was written to the Lord King and Queen: and by, De Heretico Comburendo (On Burning a Heretic), at the aforesaid Leicester, he was burned in the month of June. (Note: Thomas More in Ecclesiâ parochiali Divi Martini Leicestrie, ac post etiam in Ecclesiâ Divi Margarete, XXI die Apralis 1556, coram nobis comparuit, et multas Hereses defendit ; dicens inter cetere : “This is my faith, that in the Sacrament of the Altar is not the Body of Christ; no more than if I myself should give one piece of bread, and say, Take, eat, this is my body ; meaning my own body within my doublet.” Unde sententie contra ipsum lata. Scriptum est ad Dominem Regem et Reginem : et per Brave De Heretico Comburendo, apud Leicester predict’, mense Junii fuit combustus.“)

The record shows two things. Firstly, that the odd set up in Leicester where the suburbs fell into a prebend required two separate hearings, one in the Court of the Archdeacon in the south aisle of what is now Leicester Cathedral and in the Prebendal Court held in the church of St Margaret's. Secondly, it shows that the hearing in the Prebendal Court came second and thus that the final guilty verdict was passed in the church.

The poor young man was burned at the stake in Leicester on the 26th of June the same year. The precise location of his death is not mentioned by any of the sources.

==== The Elizabethan Reformation ====
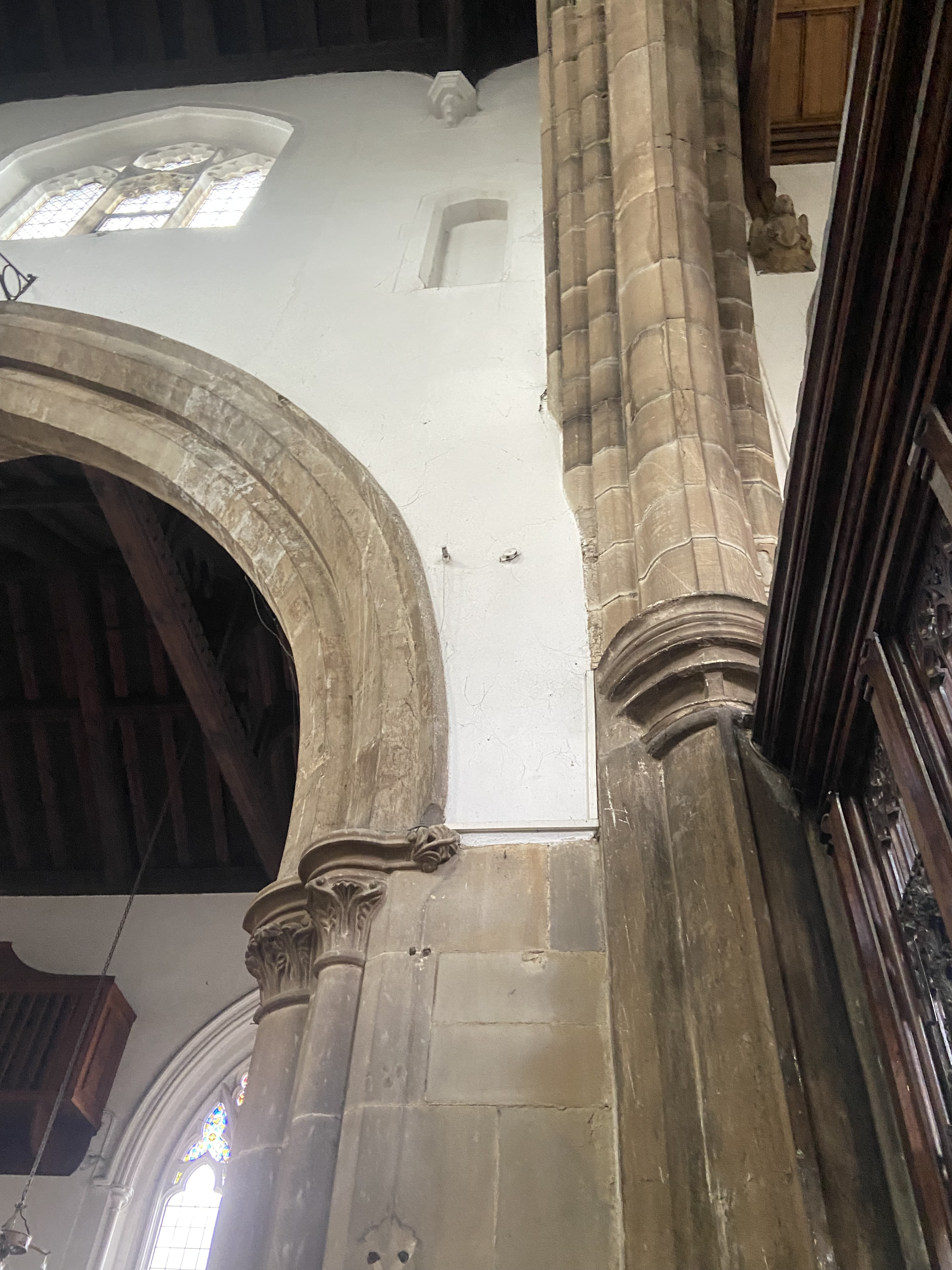
Blocked entrance to the rood loft on the north wall of the nave.

The accession of Elizabeth I on November 17, 1558, was greeted by the ringing of St Margaret's bells, as parish records clearly list. Almost immediately a new Act of Supremacy was proclaimed, an act which proved to be the final end of papal supremacy for St Margaret's and all of Leicester's and England's churches. A revised Third Book of Common Prayer was promulgated which attempted to reconcile Catholic and Protestant sentiments by ambiguity in the Holy Communion liturgy. This liturgy remained substantially unchanged until the 20th century and the modern Broad Church congregation of St Margaret's still retains the plurality of attitudes it enabled.

In 1560 John Lounde was made prebendary and set about transforming St Margaret's. The church accounts carefully record the gradual stages of this Protestant remodelling which remains in place more or less today. In 1561 commandment board were painted. In 1564 much brass wear, probably the work adorning tombs and the lectern, and many copes. In 1565 the rood loft was completely removed and the stairway leading to it was bricked up (still visible on the north wall of the nave). It is probable that all of the altars and any remaining statues stripped. One statue alone was left, that of Margaret of Antioch in the tower niche, which was still visible in the 1700s in one of John Nichols engravings.

==== Early Stuart period and Civil War ====
The latter parts of Elizabeth I's reign and the reigns of James I saw the Protestant establishment settle. In 1611 the King James Bible was published and became the text used in worship at St Margaret's until modern times.

Charles I's religious policies probably caused outrage to some in St Margaret's congregation and Leicester would come to be a stronghold of Puritan and Parliamentarian thinking during the English Civil War. The conflict would hit the prebend very badly, especially during the Siege of Leicester of May 1645. On 30 and 31 May the northern and eastern suburbs were pillaged along with the rest of the town. In spite of this terrible attack the church still dutifully rang its bells for King Charles when he visited the borough on the 13th of Feb 1647.

==== Interregnum and Puritan Reformation ====
The Interregnum and the Protectorate of Oliver Cromwell gave the churches of Leicester an extraordinary freedom to reform. In 1646 parliament abolished bishops and the church hierarchy collapsed. The Church of England was radically reformed by the Westminster Assembly, the Book of Common Prayer was banned and replaced by the Directory for Public Worship, and The Form of Presbyterial Church Government was published. Because of the collapse of the hierarchy these reforms were only implemented by congregations who wished to. It is suggested that only their parish remained loyal to the king and continued to use the prayer book and there is strong evidence reforms were made in most of Leicester's churches, either after the pattern of the Westminster Assembly or along more radical lines. Tithes also ceased during this time and in 1650 parliament ended the legal Requiescant of parish church attendance. It is therefore almost certain that the prebendary of St Margaret's, John Walcott, ceased to receive his income. Nevertheless, there remains a steady record of vicars throughout the interregnum. These were either appointed by a local Leicester presbytery or by the congregation depending on how radical the congregations Puritanism was.

==== The Restoration and Great Ejection ====
On the restoration of the monarchy under Charles II the earlier religious settlement returned, the Book of Common Prayer was once again the required service, and all clergy had to take the Oath of Supremacy. This led to the Great Ejection of 1662. The list of vicars of St Margaret's suggest its last puritan vicar, Mr Inge, was probably one of its victims and a new vicar, John Newton appears in 1663. The practical result of this reimposition of the old ways was the loss of many prebend residents to nonconformity.

=== Late 17th and 18th centuries ===
During late 17th and early 18th century the fortunes of the church continued to decline. Those parishioners who were disaffected by the restoration, probably a considerable number, gradually formed new nonconformist congregations. The Quakers constructed a meeting house in the extra parochial territory where the dissolved St Clement's Priory had been and by 1708 a new meeting house was constructed for the Presbyterians, now the Leicester Great Meeting and a Unitarian congregation. Leicester became a centre of nonconformity and this impacted the congregation numbers of all the old parishes.

In spite of a weakening of influence following the onset of religious pluralism. St Margaret's continued to retain an importance in Leicesters civic life. A number of Mayors of Leicester were residents of the prebend and worshipers in the church. Their names were recorded on a board now located at the west end of the nave under the tower arch. The prebendal court was still active meaning the archdeacon had no authority so St Margaret's retained its previous peculiar status. It also had all the general duties of poverty relief providing many cash benefits and later maintaining a workhouse, caring for orphaned children, and many other elements of public provision.

During this period the vast rural tracts of the old Bishops Fee were subject to various enclosure acts that paved the way for sale as building plots.

=== 19th century ===
During the 19th century the Prebend experienced an explosion in both population and industrial activity and the previously semi rural surroundings of the church were developed as housing (now lost) and industrial estates. This meant the loss of the formerly idyllic semi rural location of the church. The size of the prebend was reduced very significantly as daughter parishes were created out of its vast territory, first St George in the modern Cultural Quarter and then many others (see below). The church building also underwent extensive restoration during this time (see below).

==== Reform and ultimate abolition of the prebend ====
The prebend gave the parishioners of St Margaret's a great many privileges in determining how the district was run. Before the reform in government of the early to mid 1800s this power rested with the Prebendal Court and the officers it appointed. In 1819 this was reformed but only moderately and the church maintained many of its privileges through the 1819 Select Vestry Act which led to the founding of a Vestry Committee. The rate payers of the prebend were extremely independent in spirit and highly conscious of the ancient privileges St Margaret's had possessed. The Vestry Hall stood in Humberstone Gate on the corner of Vestry Street when St Margaret's could still count all the eastern suburb as its parish territory.

The prebend was maintained until 1879 when its last incumbent prebendary, J. Hobart Seymour Bartholomew, died after holding the office since 1827. The post had long been a white elephant since Leicester had come into the Diocese of Peterborough in a redrawing of boundaries in 1837. This was the severance of the ancient link of St Margaret's as the Bishop of Lincoln's particular church in the city of Leicester. Certain elements were retained. The Prebendal Court continued to meet on rare occasions until 1950 but it had become a more or less ceremonial institution. Other elements that persist are the choir's wearing of the blue cassocks in common with Lincoln Cathedral Choir to honour the Blessed Virgin Mary of Lincoln and the titular status of prebendal church, which title is still maintained informally by the church as an honorary privilege.

==== Social provision in the parish ====
The work of poverty relief fell to the Vestry Committee as well as many more basic public works such as street lighting, paving the streets, and providing a sewer system. The workhouse it maintained stood in what is now St Peter's.

==== Daughter parishes ====
Urban expansion into the Bishops Fee had begun in the Dark Ages but it came to its fruition in the 19th century. All of the modern districts of St Matthew's, much of Spinney Hills, Highfields, St Peter's, Clarendon Park, Stoneygate, Knighton (whose part medieval parish church was the chapel dependent on St Margaret's before its parochial independence), and South and West Knighton fell into the Bishops Fee estate, its parish, and after 1199 its prebend. This rapid expansion brought about many new parish churches for the new populations whose parochial territories were taken out of the prebend. They include St George (built 1823–7); Christ Church, Bow Street (1839); St Mark, Belgrave Gate (1870–2); St John the Divine Ashwell Street, London Road (1854); St Peter's Highfields (1870); St Hilda, Melbourne Road (1891); St Matthew (1857); St Saviour (1877); St Luke, Humberstone Road (1868) St James the Greater, London Road (1899–1914); and St Alban, Harrison Road (1905) among others.

==== Corah's and St Margaret's ====
The vast St Margaret's Works owned by the hosiery giant N. Corah & Sons was first established in 1855. It would come to have a profound impact on parish life, providing employment for many thousands of parishioners over many generations until the 1990s. The Corah family were benefactors of the church and are commemorated with several monuments and a stained glass window in the church. The statue of Margaret of Antioch which stood on the factory prior to its closure was relocated to the west end of the church in 2006. The now largely derelict structures of St Margaret's Works continue to dominate the environment of the church and is visible from the churchyard.

==== Victorian restorations ====
Like many parish churches in England, including all four of her ancient sister parishes in old Leicester, St Nicholas, St Mary de Castro, St Martin's, and All Saints, St Margaret's was thoroughly and controversially restored during the 19th century. Very early in the century the degraded 15th century tracery was replaced by William Firmadge. His work was so appalling that it was replaced within 60 years. The chancel was restored in 1846, when the east window, which had long been blocked up, was repaired and filled with stained glass and west end organ loft was removed in 1850 opening up the view of the tower vault. The present pews were installed in 1853. In 1860 the chancel arch was taken down and reconstructed using the original materials under George Gilbert Scott. In 1864 Scott also redesigned the botched work of the Lady Chapel and north aisle east windows. From 1880 to 1882 another round of restoration was undertaken by George Edmund Street during which the roofs were replaced, a large array of crumbling exterior stonework was replaced, and the pavement of the nave and tower laid. This round of works were some of the last of Streets career. 1899 saw a number of notable additions including the chimes of the clock tower and the clock faces on the northern, western, and southern sides of the tower and the chancel reredos designed by George Frederick Bodley.

=== 20th and 21st centuries ===
The parish boundaries have been yet again redrawn with St Margaret's inheriting the parish of All Saints and St Leonard's and the cathedral taking most of the city centre including the historic Bishops Fee suburbs (now city centre) of Belgrave Gate and Humberstone Gate. The slum areas that filled its parish were also largely demolished in the 1960s and the inner ring road cut the northern ward of the historic old town off from the city centre isolating the church from its natural pool of attenders and visitors.

==== Leicester Diocese ====
In 1926 St Margaret's diocesan affiliation switched a second time to the reestablished Diocese of Leicester. In the early 1920s there was stiff competition between St Martin's and St Margaret's parishes for cathedral status and St Martins won when it was made a collegiate church ahead of the creation of the diocese and made cathedral in 1927. St Martin's victory has made St Margaret's less of the centrepiece of Leicesters churches that it was historically and funding for the church has been limited in recent times.

==== 20th century fabric alterations ====
The wooden inner porches on the west and north door were put in the 1930s. The choir stalls also date to this time. The pews of the north aisle were removed in 1993.

==== Loss of residents and industry ====
As stated most local housing was demolished in the 1960s. The area around the church remained a thriving industrial centre but this too has significantly declined. The major blow came in the 1990s when the neighbouring St Margaret's Works was closed.

==== Vandalism ====
Situated just outside the city centre in an area largely bereft of residents, the church has been the victim of a number of significant attacks of vandalism. The most notable of these was in 2008

== Building ==
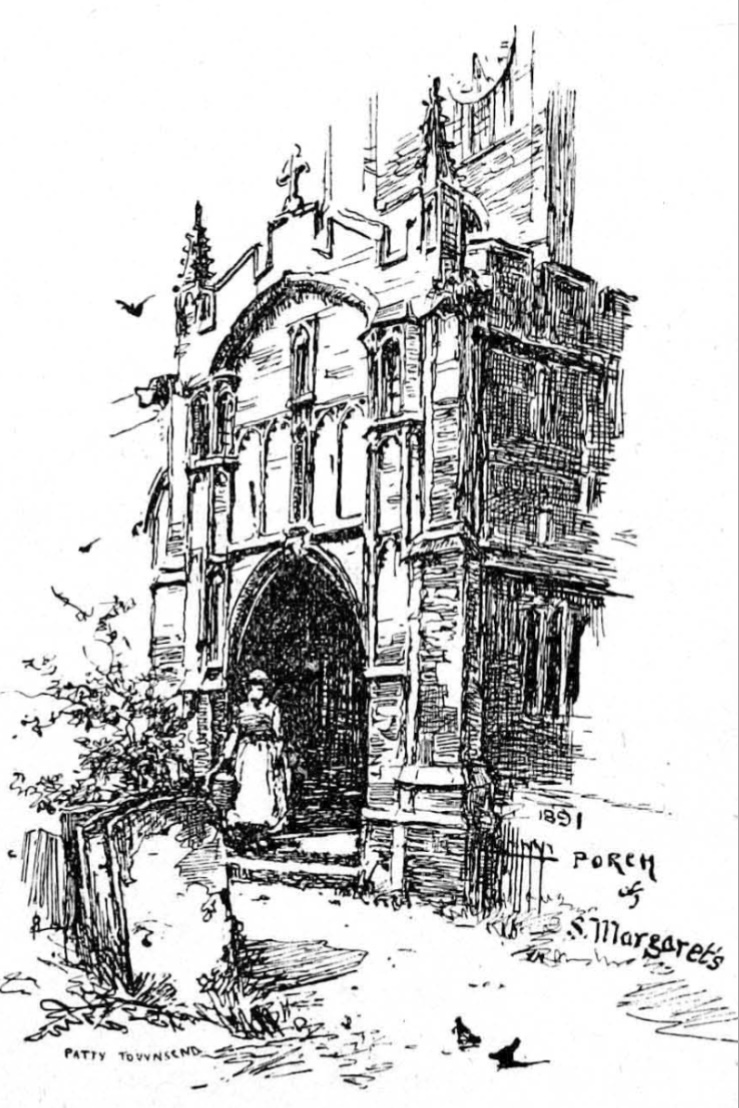
South porch of St Margaret's Church, Leicester sketched by Patty Townsend

=== Exterior ===
The exterior of St Margaret's is dominated by its large west tower, prominent south porch, and large chancel, the largest in the city. All of these date to the 15th century reconstruction project. It is by far the most architecturally unified of all the church edifices in the city and maintains an even perpendicular aspect on all sides. There is also an easily overlooked the corner pinnacle which most likely acted as a kind of preaching cross in the churchyard. The niches contained statues, one of which was probably of the Virgin Mary.

=== South porch ===
The double story south porch is a notably fine example of its kind and typical of late Medieval English ecclesiastical architecture. According to Pevsner it is the only double height vaulted porch in Leicestershire. It dates to the mid-1400s. It is perhaps a conscious mirror to the Galilee south porch at Lincoln Cathedral. The vaulting is tierceron. The much eroded carving over the gate is most likely the Holy Spirit as a dove or a pelican. If the former then it would have been placed there to represent the descent of the Holy Spirit on pilgrims to the church on Whit Monday. The upper room was of the porch, now unused, has served various functions in its history.

==== Sanctuary ring ====
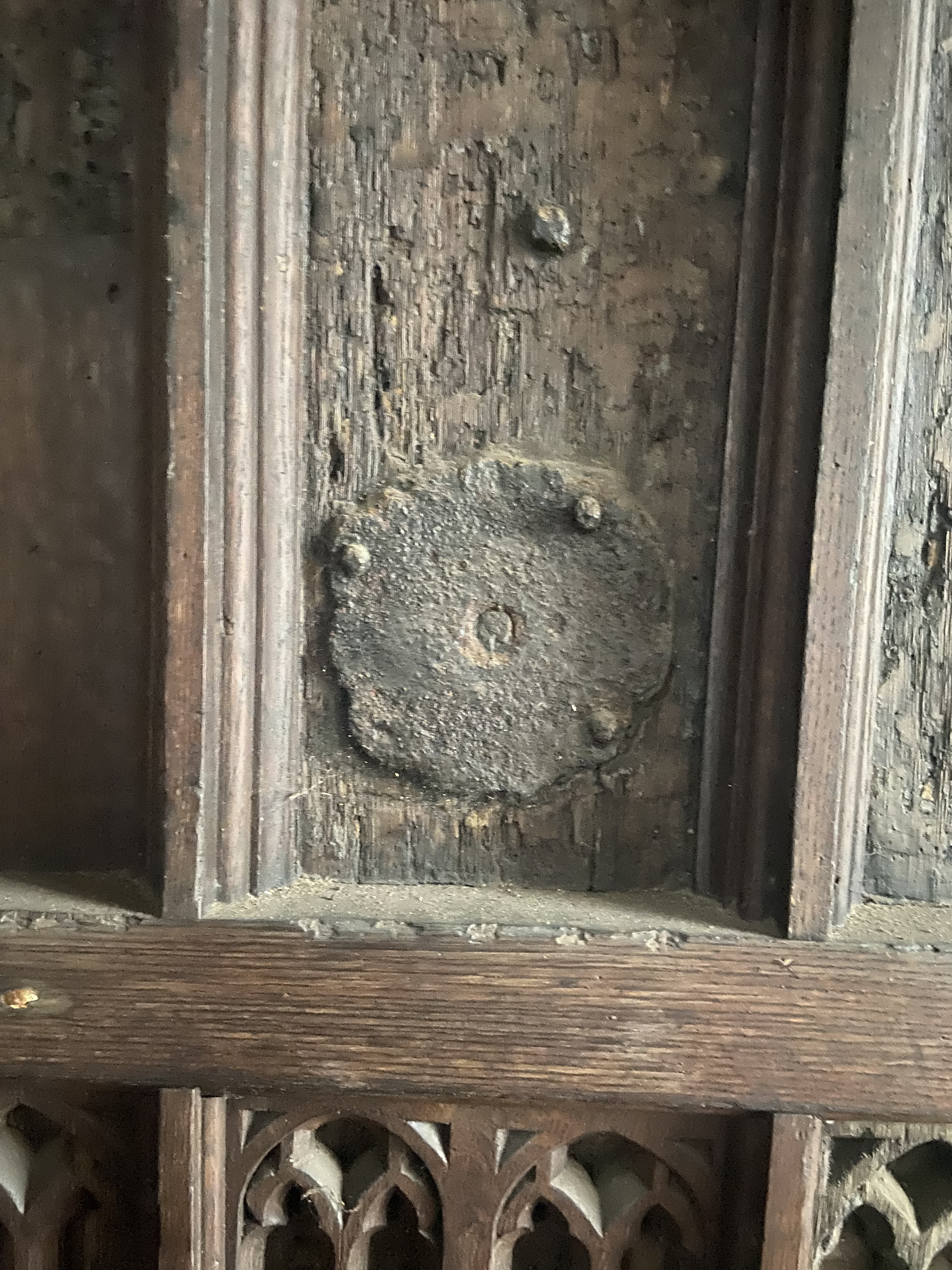
The sanctuary knocker

The south door is apparently older than the porch itself, probably dating to the 13th century. On the door there is the visible remains of a brass disc. This served as the base of a Sanctuary knocker. The practice of sanctuary for those fleeing the law in the church is ancient and there are many such knockers in England. The principle was that captors were required to let a person go if they managed to run to a church and holding onto the knocker acted as a means of claiming this sanctuary when the church was locked in the evening. The fact that the ring was broken off suggests a desire to enforce the end of the practice which came by 1623. Sanctuary laws still apply to some extent in parts of mainland Europe, notably Germany.

=== Tower ===
The monumental tower is 33 meters high and dominates the west front of the church. It is the buildings most recognised feature in the city. Aside from its sheer size, its most notable element is the unusual castellated corner staircase turret which like the porch vaulting unique to Leicestershire according to Pevsner. Also notable is the large processional west door, the large tower window, and the niche on the west front that formerly held a statue of the patron, Margaret of Antioch. The upper sections of the tower are heavily decorated in a perpendicular style with 7 pinnacles and a number of large grotesques difficult to observe from ground level due to their height.

==== Tower interior ====
Inside the tower is supported by two monumental piers and three tower arches, the eastern being the largest. The interior of the tower on its ground floor is vaulted with tierceron vaulting like the south porch and punctuated at its summit by a Holy Ghost hole. It is likely this played a ritual purpose during the Whit Monday procession, perhaps as a means of casting petals or holy water on the crowds entering the church beneath or as place to reenact the assumption or the ascension with statues. The baptismal font, now located in the south aisle, also stood in the tower probably from its first construction.

For a description of the bells and the notable tradition of ringing at the church see the section on bells below.

=== Nave ===
The nave is 5 bays in length and shows evidence of very distinct phases of construction. The stone of the south arcade appears to be significantly older than that of the north. It is generally assumed that the south arcade dates to the 13th century rebuild at least in part. The north arcade is originally 14th century but was probably reconstructed in the 19th century. The clerestory level and the 10 clerestory windows were added in the 14th century. The south arcade is older and more interesting of the two. The easternmost bay of the south arcade has evidence of especially early work. The first pier was clearly constructed in two parts with the capital of the pier at its earlier height left in place. This strange double height effect has been imitated by the Victorian rebuilders on the north arcade. The easternmost bay is the site of the old 12th-century transept crossing.

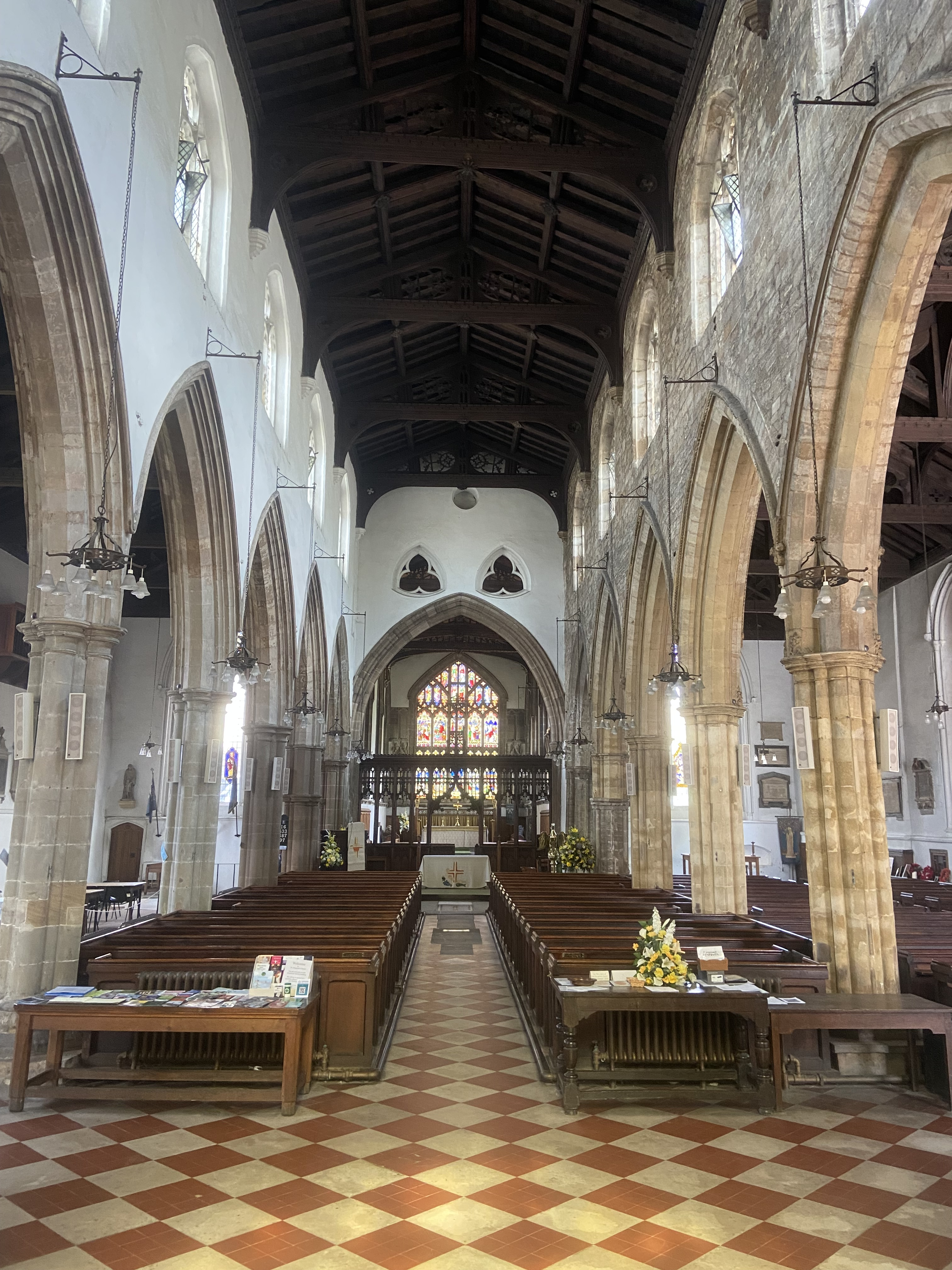
Nave of Saint Margaret's. Note the different stages of masonry work on either sides.

The nave is home to the only excavated section of an earlier Saxon church of the late 10th century and a few of the foundation stones are visible through a hole covered in enforced glass. Its location reveals that the 10th century structure was narrower than even the present nave and that no part of the present floor plan represents the older church. Noteworthy too is the remains of the old rood loft entrance at floor level and where the stairs came out up towards the top of the chancel arch. The present 19th century chancel screen acts as a descendant of the medieval rood screen and loft that would have risen much higher. The chancel arch and the two trefoils above it were reconstructed in the 19th century by Gilbert Scott but copy exactly the form found there. The trefoils were in fact restorations having been walled up in the reformation when the rood screen was pulled down.

Furniture in the nave includes the pews of 1853, the Mayors board and the painting of the Holy Family at the west end on the piers of the tower, the nave altar, the pulpit, and the brass lectern.

=== Chancel ===
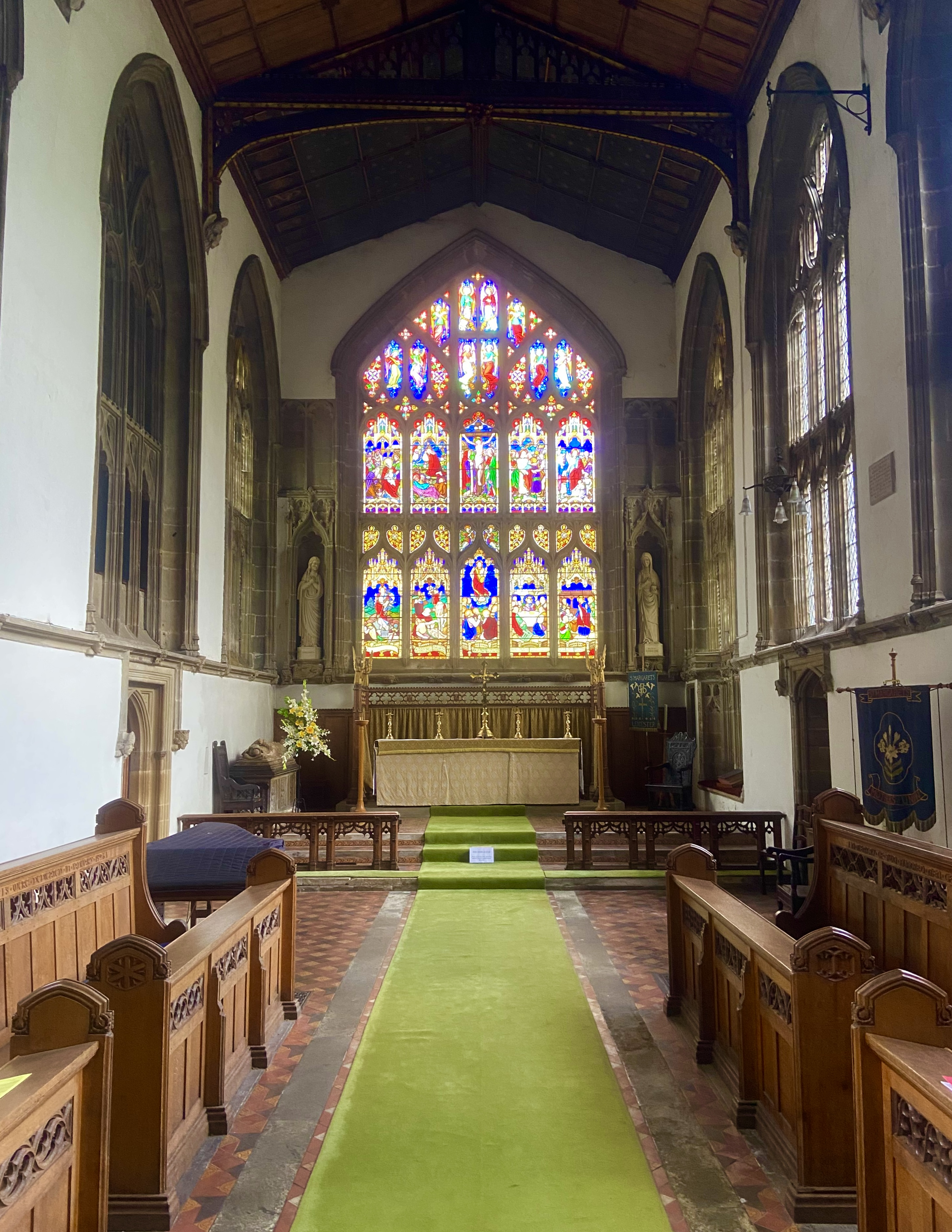
Chancel facing east to the high altar.

The chancel is of 4 bays, almost as long as the nave itself, and was constructed during the rebuilding campaign of the late 1400s. The very large windows were designed to emit enough light for Latin texts and chant notation to be read by the dim light of early morning. The space is still very airy and spacious and made more so by the light wood used on the choir stalls. Of note is the now disused priests door in the south wall, the many delicate carvings of human heads around the roof, the east window, the highly decorated east wall niches, the sedilia and piscine on the south wall, and the tomb of John Penny to the north of the high altar. For a description of the east window see the section on stained glass below.

==== Carvings ====
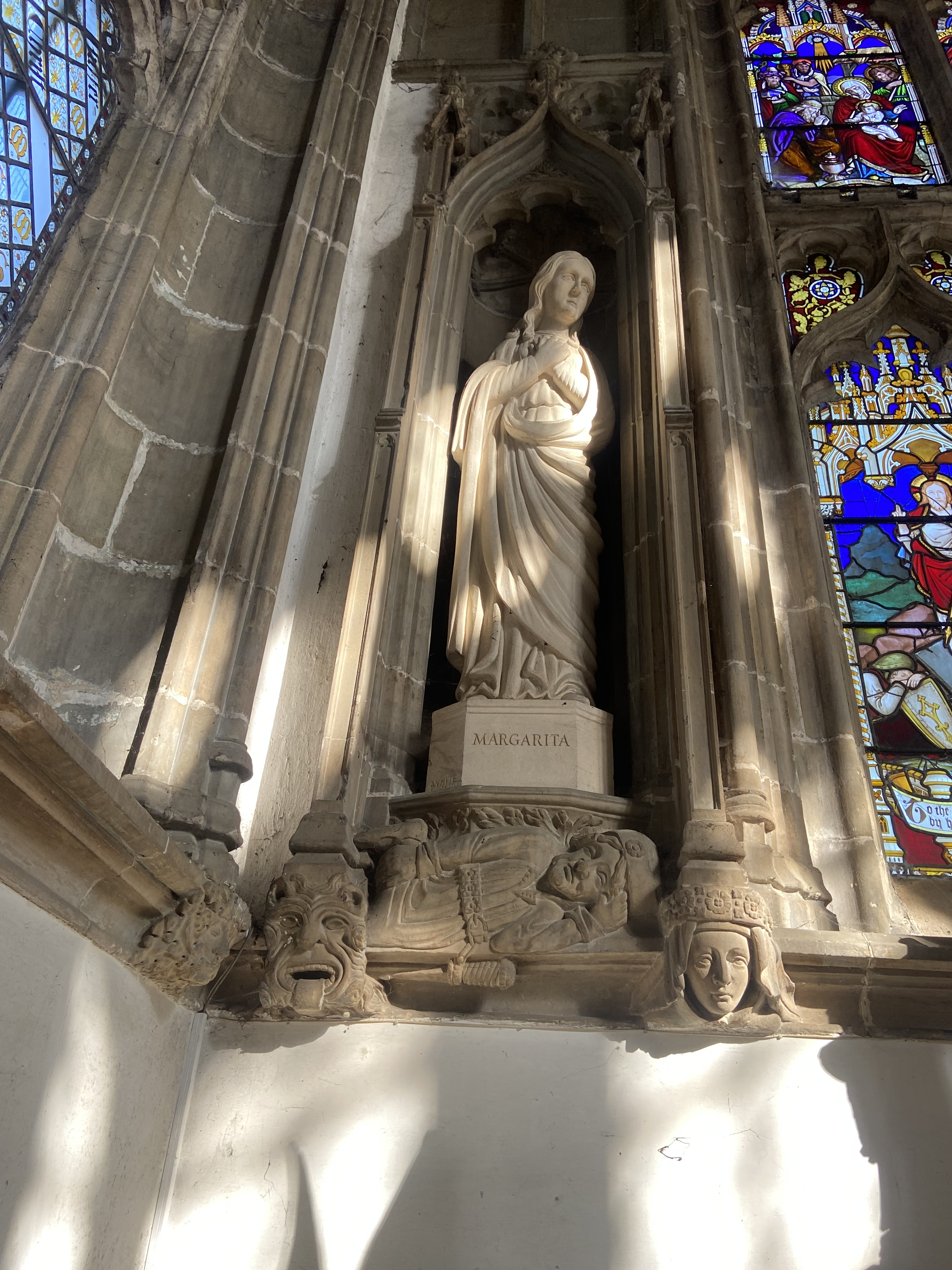
Niche carving of Olybrius in the chancel. Dates to the 15th century reconstruction begun in 1444.

The niches on either side of the high altar are particularly elaborately carved. The underside of the northern niche depicts the sleeping Olybrius, the Roman governor whose advanced Margaret spurned for Christ in her legend. The image is very well executed, probably the best surviving example of 15th-century masonry in the city. The corbel to the left of his carving is probably the imagined face of the dragon involved in her martyrdom. Both of these details have led scholars of the church's architecture to assume that the patronal statue of Margaret was housed in this niche. Its opposite number on the south side bears a lion in the place of Olybrius and it has been assumed a statue of the Virgin Mary or Mary Magdalene was housed here. Both niches have had statues restored to them in the 20th century, Margaret on the left and Mary Magdalene holding a jar of spices on the right.

Aside from the niches there are many other carved details and an exceptionally large number of Green Man carvings around the sedilia and decorating the corbels at the bottom of the windows.

==== Sedilia ====
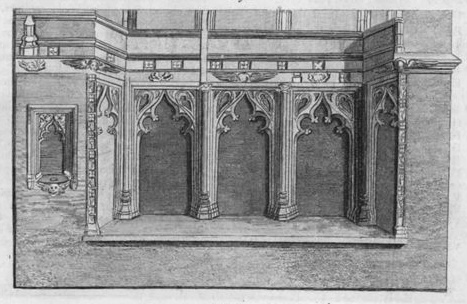
Sedilia and piscina in St Margaret's 15th century chancel, taken from John Nichols History and Antiquities of Leicestershire.

The sedilia and piscina is located in the usual place on the south side of the high altar (right hand side facing eastwards to the altar). It sits right under the last window bay. It is ornamented with two green men and an angel and lacks the usual triple niched canopy, probably to admit more light to early morning liturgical proceedings. This acted as the seat of the priest and two deacons, the three sacred ministers needed to celebrate a mass with full ritual (Solemn High Mass). The piscine to the left of the sedilia was the place the deacons would wash the sacred vessels and where the priest would wash his fingers during the celebration.

==== Squints ====
The squint hole in the north wall of the chancel is a much discussed feature of the building. It is very specifically trained on the middle of the high altar and would have been used to watch the celebration of mass, particularly the elevation of the Eucharistic Host and the chalice or to gaze on the place where the Eucharist was reserved, the pyx probably hanging over the altar. Who used it is not known but subject to much popular guesswork. It is possibly the hole an anchoress could peer through suggesting there may have been an anchorage cell on the north side of the chancel. Alternatively it may have been used as a place for leapers to observe the service and this account has become the most popular. Most likely is that it served as a means for the sacristan to observe the service given they face into the vestry which is we old as the chancel.

==== John Pennys tomb ====
The early 16th century alabaster effigy of John Penny Jnr, the Lord Abbot of Leicester (1496 to 1509) and subsequently consecrated as bishop and enthroned as Bishop of Bangor (1504–1508) and Bishop of Carlisle (1508–1520) successively, is located on the north side of altar. It reveals in great detail the traditional vestments of a bishop, the chasuble, the dalmatic worn under the chasuble, the maniple, the episcopal crosier, and the mitre. The base of the effigy is a Victorian reconstruction.

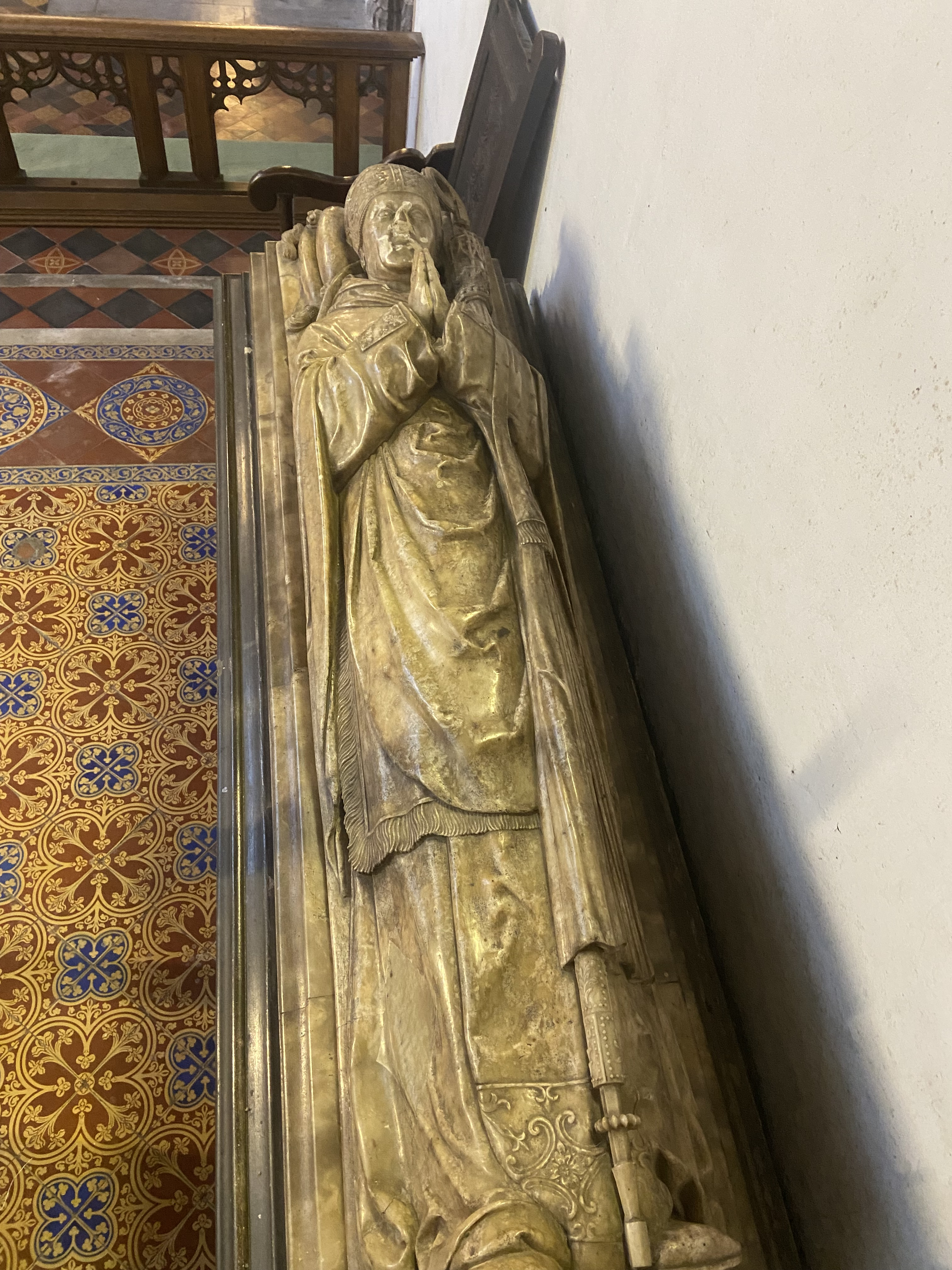
John Penny Jnr's tomb in the chancel.

It was long thought that the tomb must have rested in Leicester Abbey prior to the reformation. This was disproven by Dr Ernest Morris, a historian and verger of St Margaret's for much of the 20th century. He showed that an elder John Penny, mayor of the town for 1481–2, had been a parishioner of St Margaret's and that the future abbot and bishop was likely his eldest son. His will also leaves specific instructions for interment at St Margaret's and made several bequests to the church. It seems certain therefore that effigy has always stood in its present place, that Penny is indeed buried under it, and that his father is possibly buried in close proximity.

==== Choir stalls and high altar ====
The choir stalls are 20th century, dating to the 1930s. The clergy stalls are the ones backing onto the chancel screen. The heraldry on the stalls panelling suggest themes from Christian theology while the armorial decorations of the clergy stalls are those of the old prebend, Lincoln Cathedral, and the Diocese of Leicester.

=== North aisle ===
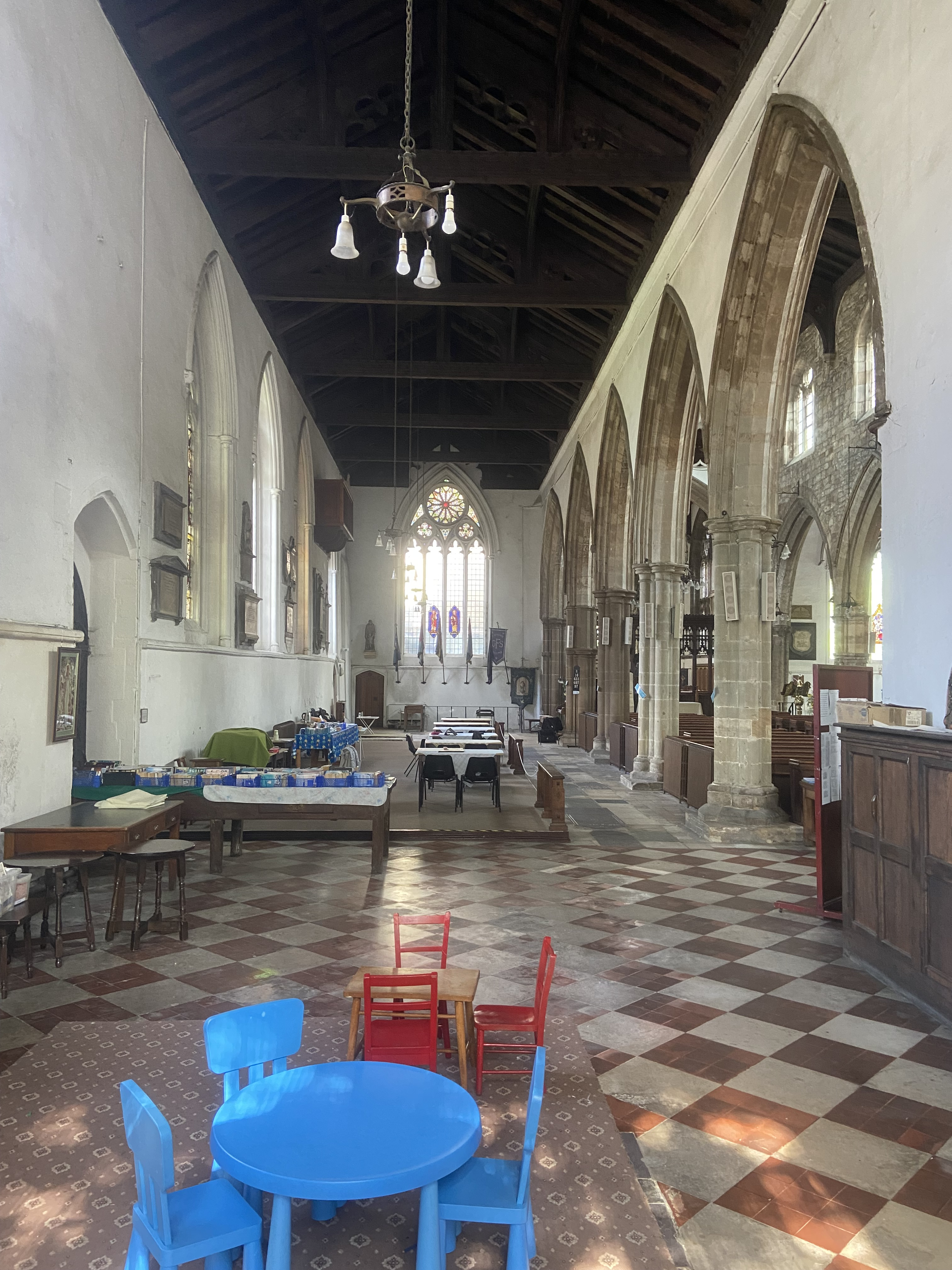
North aisle looking east.

The north aisle, like the south aisle, is very similar in width to the main nave and longer, 6 bays including the tower instead of 5. The east end of aisle was a transept of the 12th century church but the date the rest of it is debated. It is possibly 13th century like the north aisle or it may date to the 14th century reconstruction explaining the disparity of stone which is the most puzzled over elements of the structure. During the Middle Ages the north aisle is thought to have been the chapel of the guild of St Katherine but this is chiefly conjecture. The pews were removed in 1993 and the area made into a space for post liturgical refreshments. Of note in the north aisle is the excavated well, a couple of the windows, the little statue of mother and child, and the memorial of Robert Grosseteste over the door to the choir vestry.

==== The excavated well ====
At the east end of the north aisle a well dating to the 13th century has been excavated and left exposed to be seen. It is very shallow, testament to the very high water table around the church. It was probably sunk as a means of accessing water for mixing mortar during the construction project of the 1300s. Broken tiles thrown into the well to fill it have been dated to the early 13th century hence the dating of the well.

=== South aisle ===
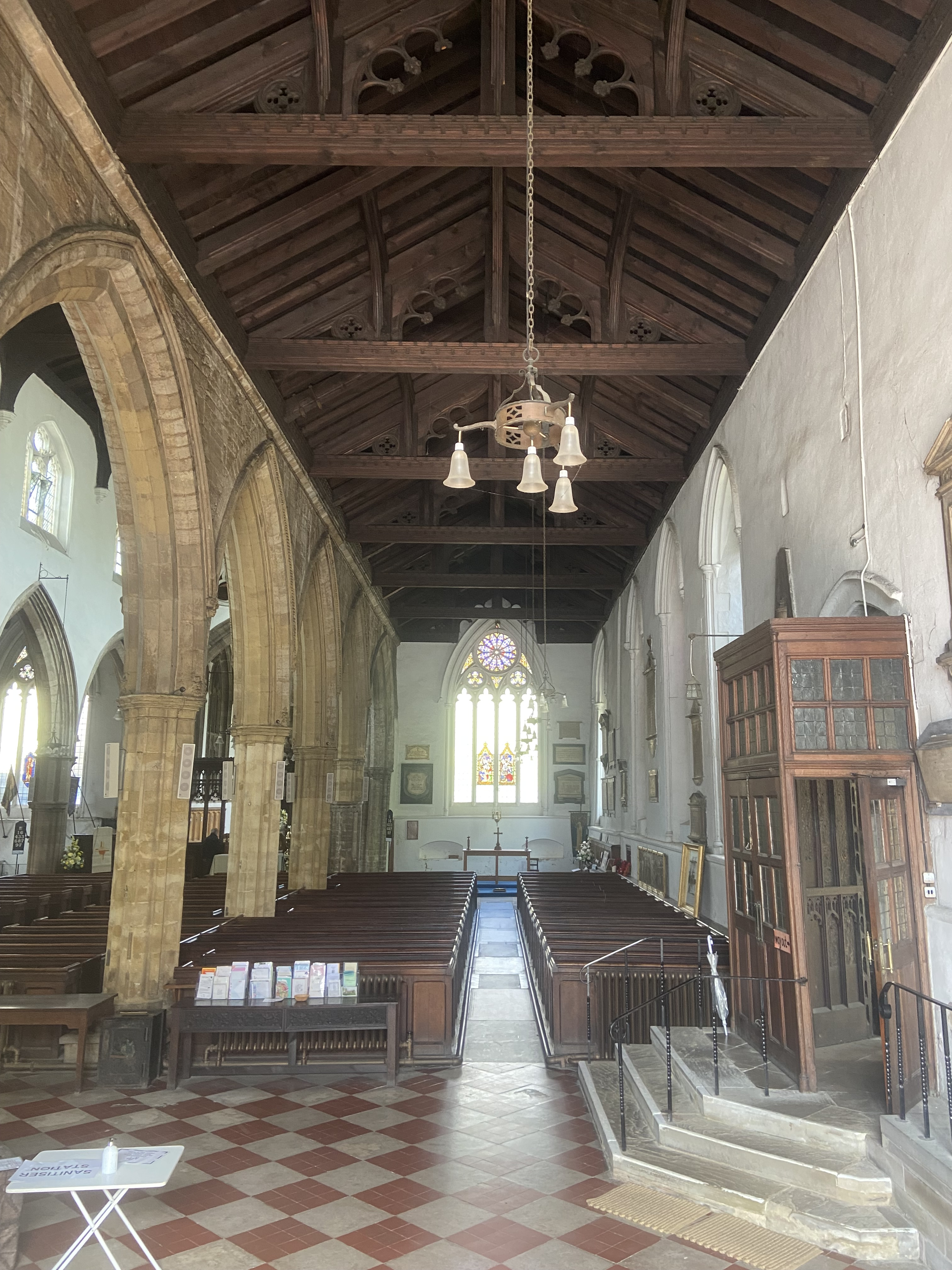
South aisle and Lady Chapel looking east

The south aisle as stated is of equal breadth to the north and is chiefly noted by its lancet shaped windows, its decorative carving on the capitals of the arcade, some of the stained glass (see below), an early funeral monument its floor, the Lady Chapel, and the font.

==== Lady Chapel ====
The Lady Chapel was, and remains, the eastern end of the south aisle. The two arched niches to the rear of the altar were probably part of the Easter Sepulchre ritual and the payment of two “sepulchre watchers” is recorded in 1553, during the years of the Marian Restoration of Catholicism. If this is so then the position of the altar was possibly against the south wall and the ends of the aisles still treated as transepts. A feature suggesting the devotion of the aisle to Mary are the many carved floral emblems of the Virgin carved in the stonework of the arcade.

==== Font ====
The 15th century baptismal font stands at the west end of the south aisle facing the tower arch. It is typically octagonal, 8 symbolising eternity, the new creation, and many themes in baptismal theology. It was probably carved for the new church in the 1400s and has witnessed the baptism of probably ten thousand or more people in its history serving the vast parish of the Bishops Fee.

==== The Guild chest ====
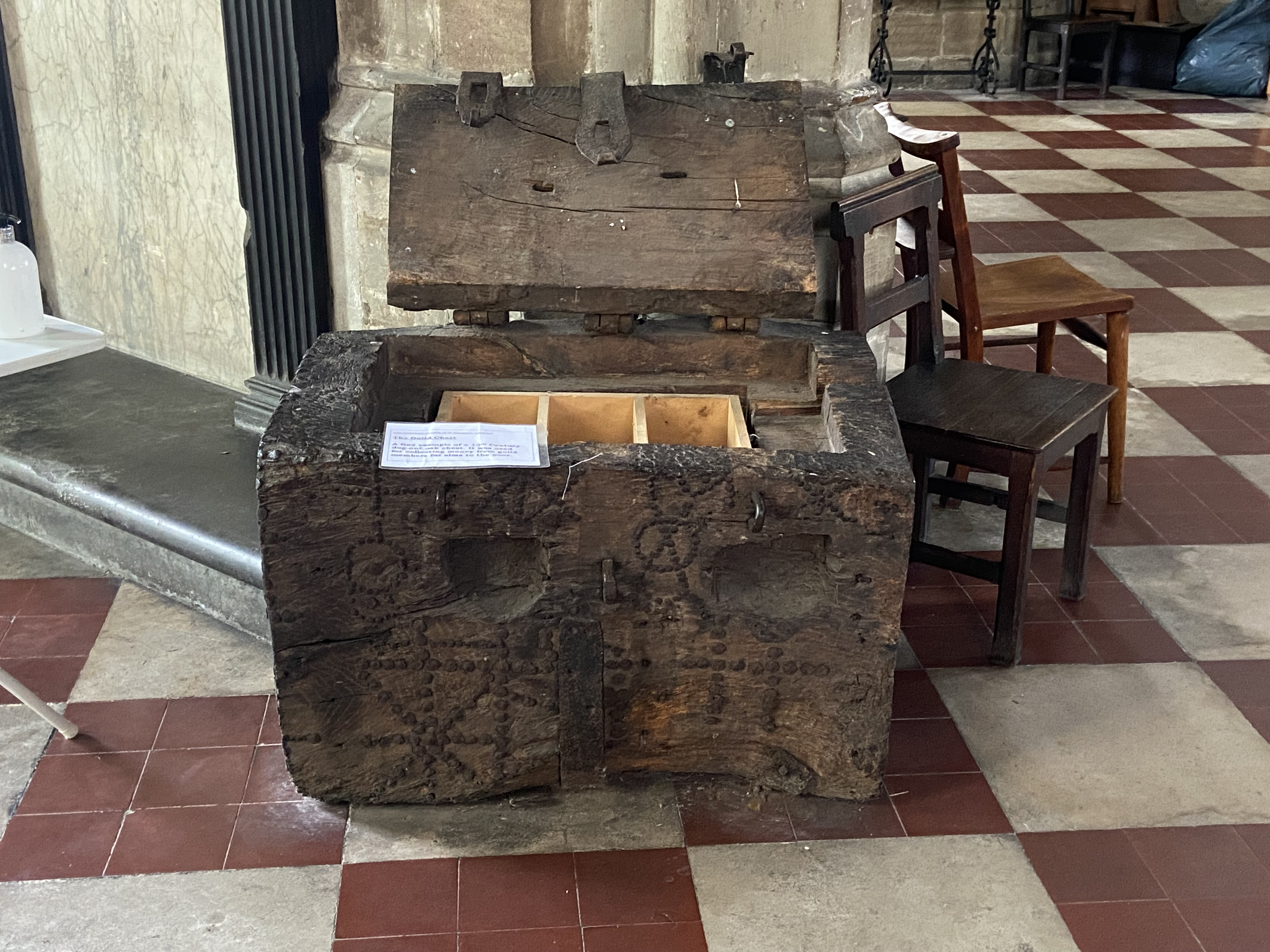
Medieval Guild Chest showing the wheel emblem of Katherine of Alexandria.

== Stained Glass ==
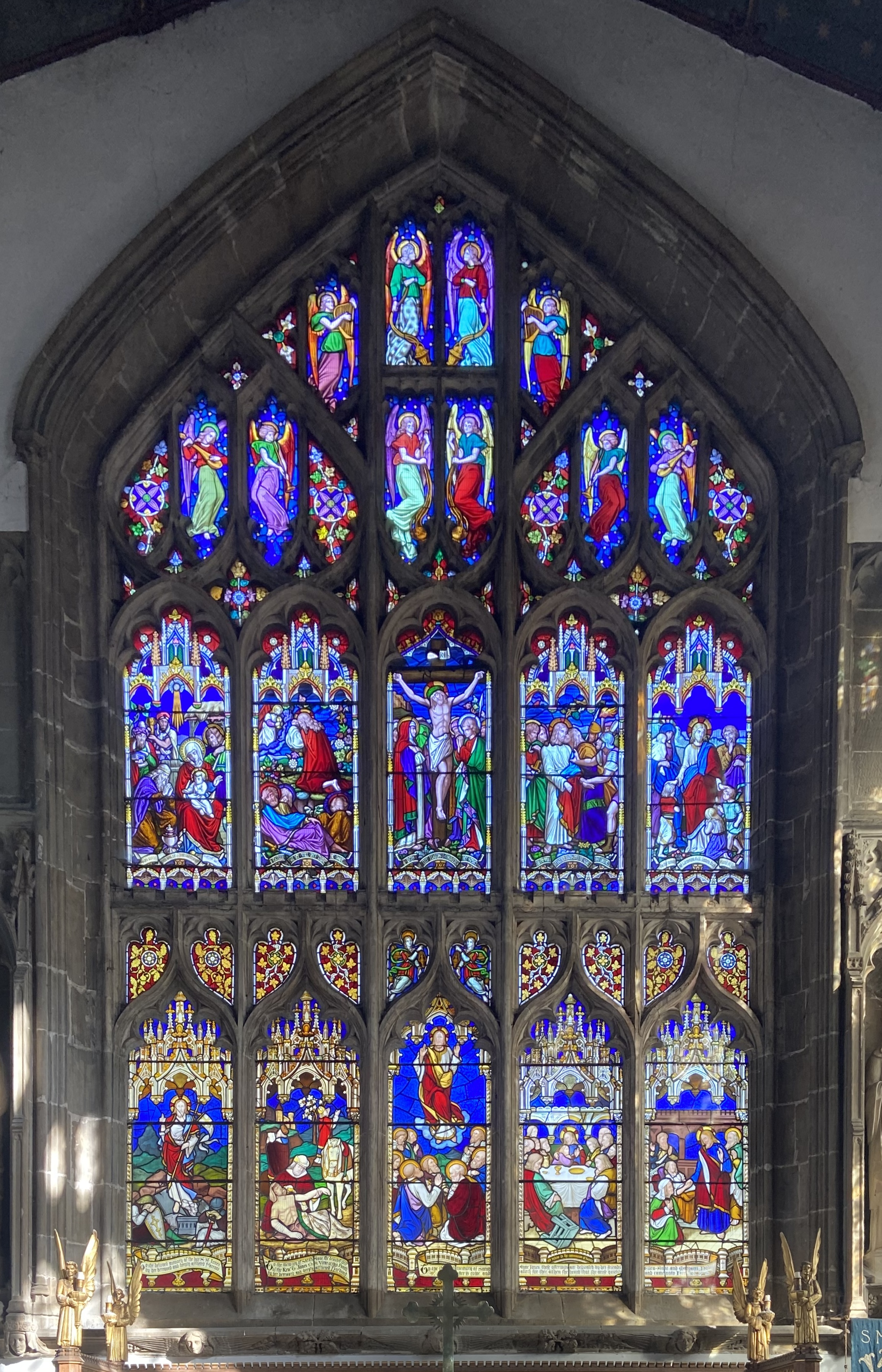
East window - St Margaret's Church, Leicester

Although not as rich in stained glass as either St Mary de Castro or the cathedral, St Margaret's nevertheless has some fragments in almost all of its windows and has 7 complete stained glass windows.

=== East Window ===
By far the largest and finest of all the windows is the one behind the altar in the chancel at the east end of the church. It was erected in memory of multiple member's of the Jones family, relatives of the Rev Timothy Jones, vicar of St Margaret's for 25 years between 1850 and 1875. The upper panels depict, from left to right, the adoration of the Magi, three central scenes from the Passion of Christ, the agony in the Garden of Gethsemane, the Crucifixion, the Kiss of Judas, and on the far right, a depiction of the verse "suffer the little children to come to me". The lower panels (again from left to right) represent the Resurrection of Christ, the Parable of the Good Samaritan, the Ascension, the Last Supper, and the raising of the son of the widow of Nain.

Other panels clearly designed for this window, including several duplicate panels, litter the windows of the east ends of the south and north aisles.

=== Edwin Corah window ===
Located in the tower under the vault and erected by a friend of Edwin Corah, a member of the family which ran the main hosiery manufacturers in the parish. The window depicts Christs agony in the garden, the crucifixion, the Deposition of Christ, and the resurrection.

=== Windows in the north aisle ===
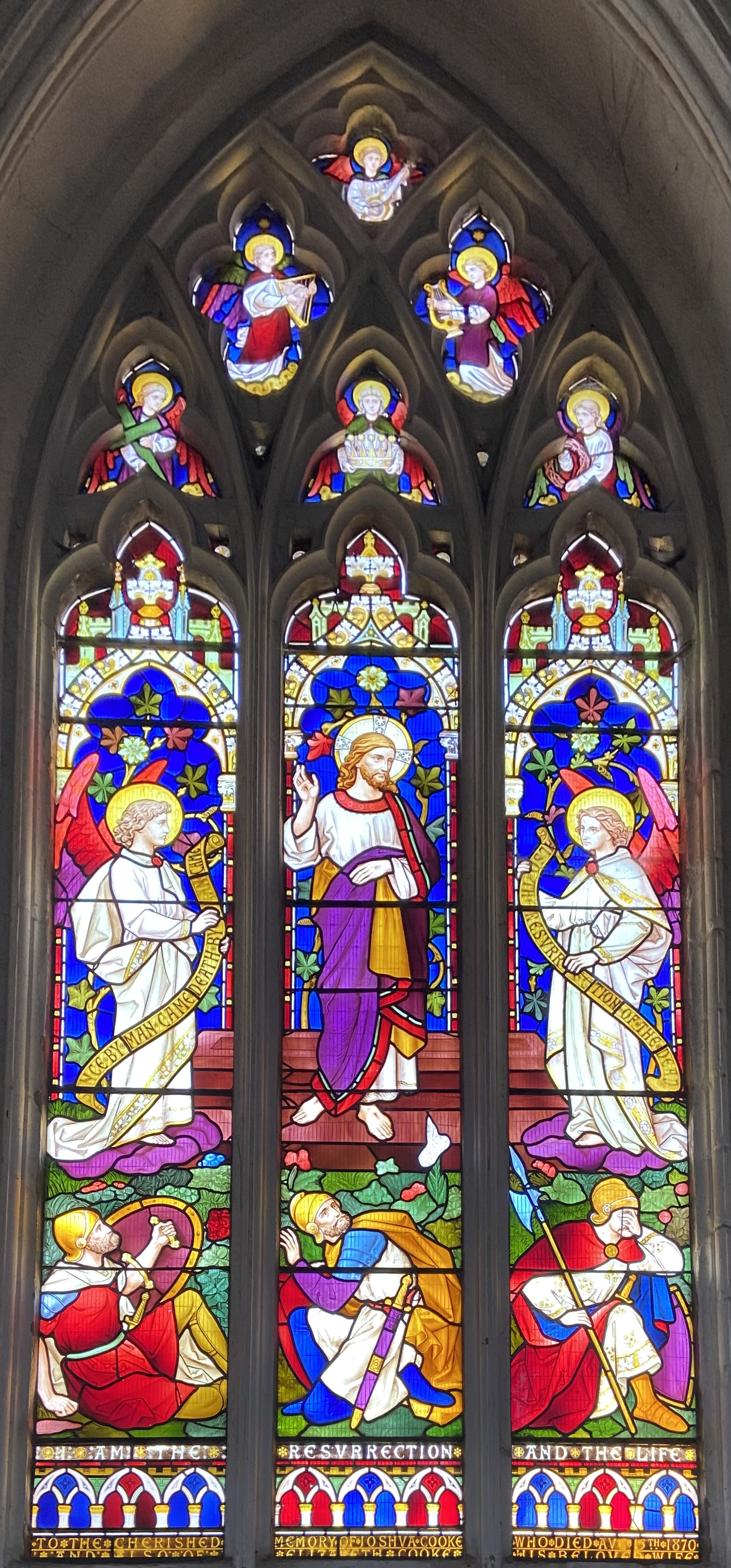
Joshua and Elizabeth Cook Window (closeup) - St Margaret's Church, Leicester

==== Joshua and Elizabeth Cook window ====
The window in the second bay of the north aisle counting from the east. A much larger depiction of the resurrection than in either the Corah or the East window. The figure of the Risen Christ is flanked by two angels holding banners inscribed with the words "since by man came death, by man came also the resurrection of the dead", verse 21 of chapter 15 of the First Epistle to the Corinthians. The main figures are positioned above 3 figures of the soldiers guarding the tomb. At the base of the window is the memorial inscription to Joshua Cook (here spelled Cooke, probably a medievalist affectation), who died on August 15, 1870, and of his wife Elizabeth Cook, whose death date is not given.

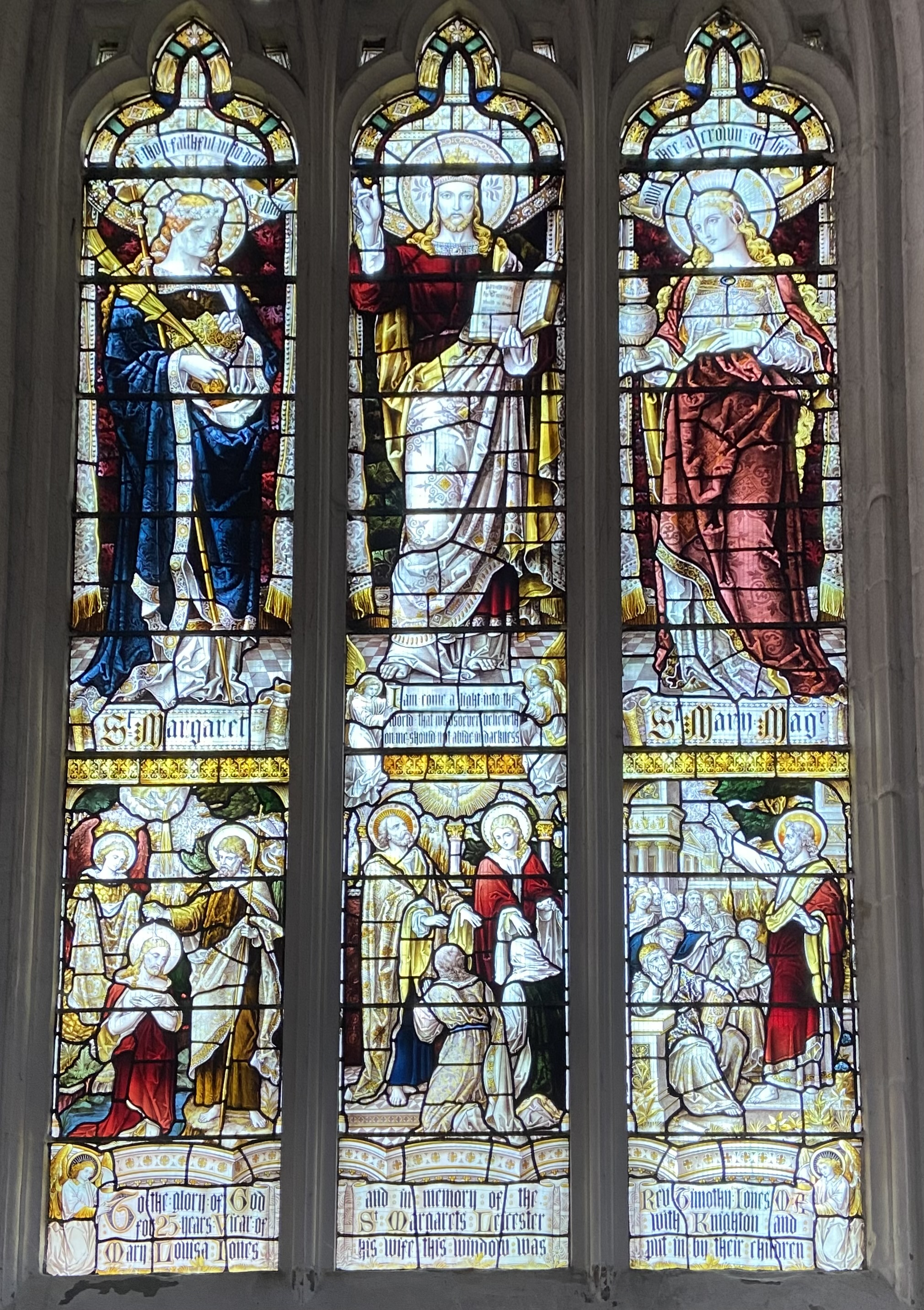
Timothy and Mary Jones window (closeup) - St Margaret's Church, Leicester

==== Timothy and Mary Jones Window ====
The window in the fourth bay of the north aisle counting from the east. An elaborate depiction of Christ the light of the world. The central figure is flanked by Margaret of Antioch to the left, dressed in blue and holding a martyrs crown and palm, and Mary Magdalene to the left, dressed in red and holding the jar of oil and spices she used anoint Christs body. The lower scenes represent left to right the Baptism of Christ in the Jordan, the Apostles Peter and John calling down the Holy Spirit on new believers in Samaria (a scene described in Acts 8), and on the right Paul the Apostles sermon at Jerusalem (a scene described in Acts 21 and 22). The window is dedicated to Timothy Jones, vicar of St Margaret's for the quarter century between 1850 and 1875, and his wife Mary Louisa Jones.

=== Windows in the south aisle ===
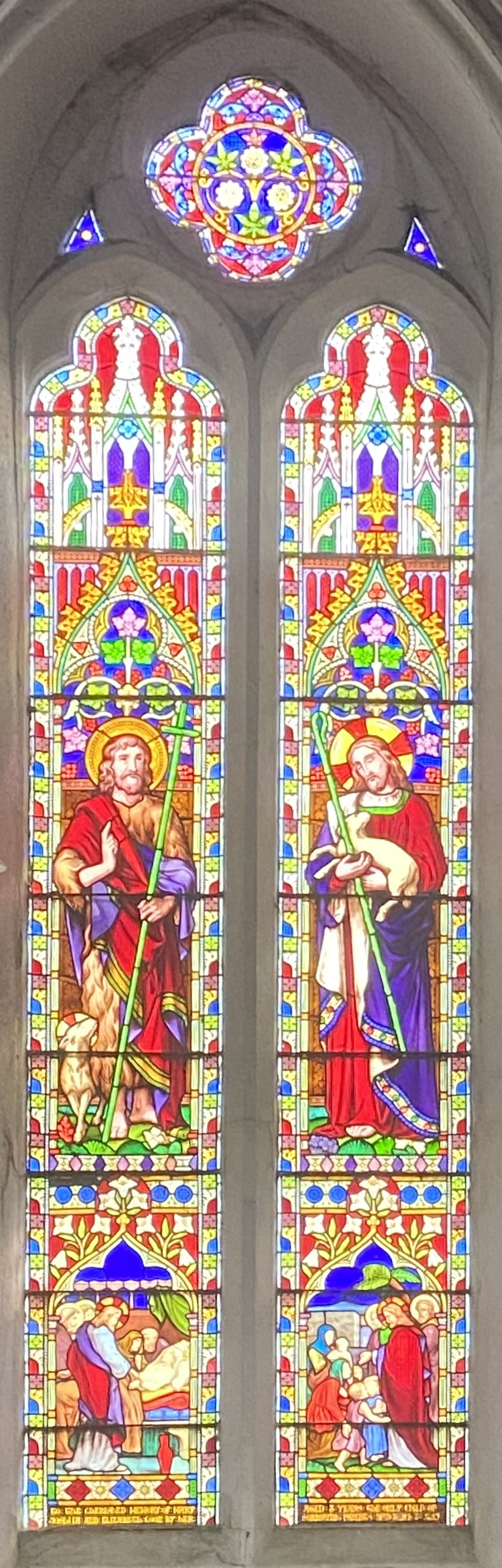
Mary Cook window (closeup) - St Margaret's Church, Leicester

==== Mary Cook window ====
The window of the second bay of the south aisle counting from the east. One of the south aisle lancets it depicts Christ the Good Shepherd on the right and John the Baptist on the left. The lower panels represent the raising of the son of the widow of Nain and Christ calling the children, scenes also found in the east window. The Mary Cook, to whom the window is dedicated, was just 8 years old when she died and her parents are the Joshua and Elizabeth commemorated by the resurrection window across the church in the north aisle. The little girl died on March 8, 1857.

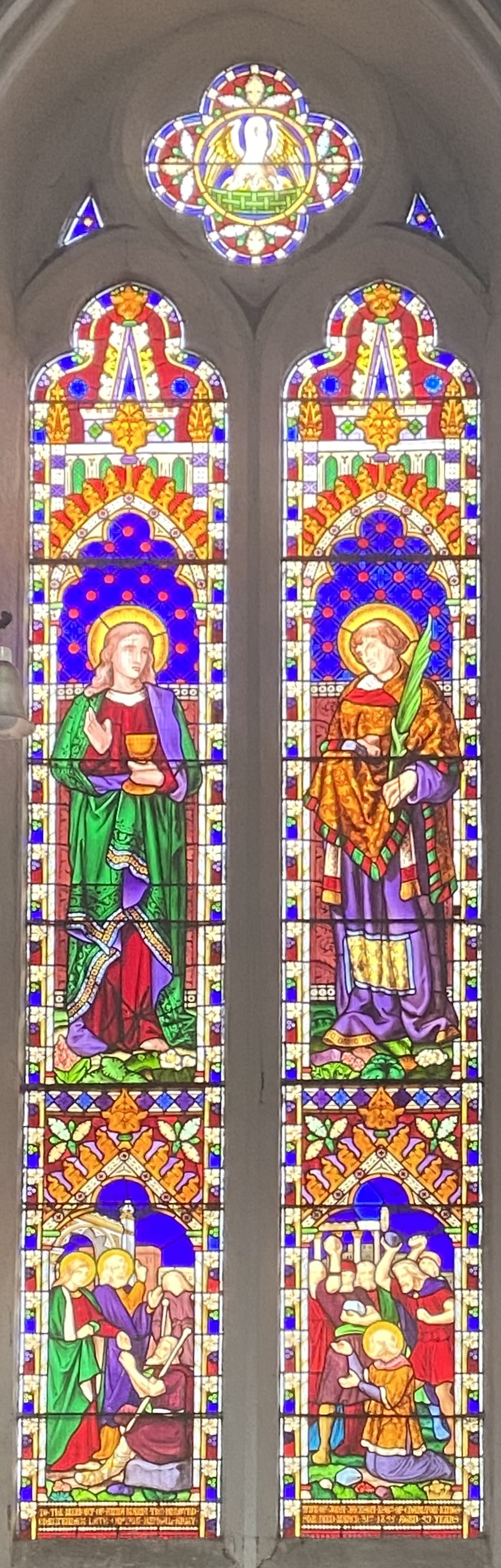
Anna Maria Jackson window (closeup) - St Margaret's Church, Leicester

==== Anna Maria Jackson window ====
The window of the third bay of the south aisle. The left panel depicts John the Apostle above, dressed in green and holding his characteristic chalice, and the healing at the Beautiful Gate by John and Peter below (a scene from Acts 3). The right hand panel depicts Steven the Protomartyr above, dressed as a Deacon in Alb and Dalmatic holding the stones used in his martyrdom, and the Stoning of Steven beneath (a scene from Acts 7). The roundel above the two panels at the top depicts the Pie Jesu Pelicani. The window was erected to the memory of Anna Maria Jackson, died March 31'st 1855, by her husband John. Notable to modern eyes is the fact that its dedicatory inscription describes the husband at length while only giving the name and death date of Anna Maria.

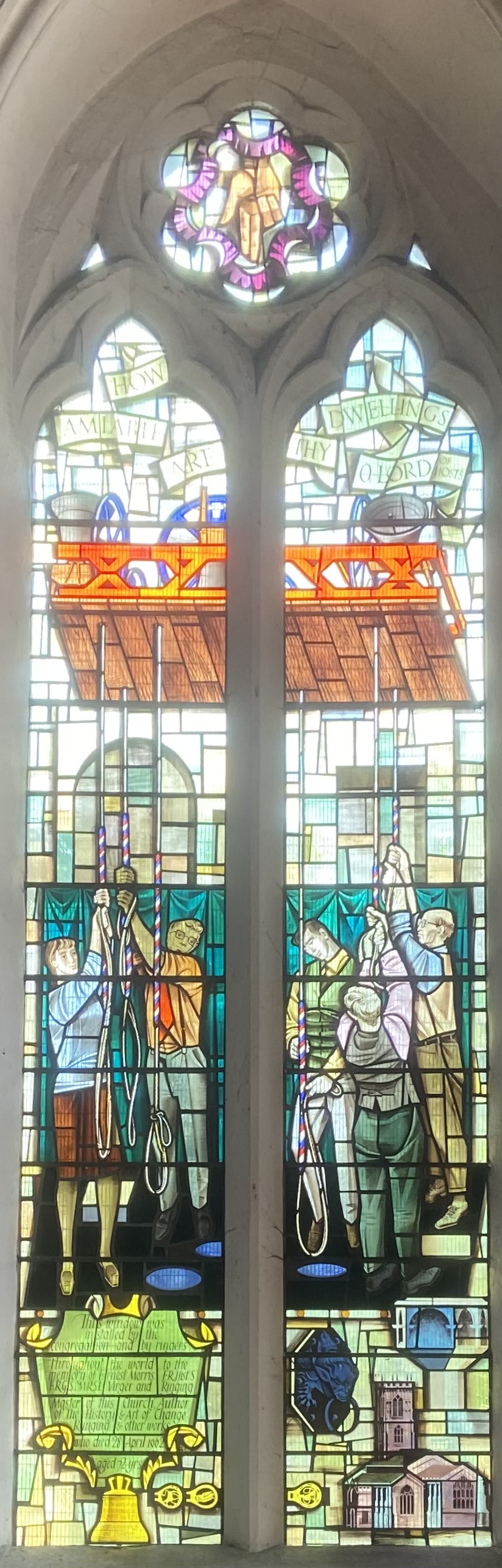
Ernest Morris window (closeup) - St Margaret's Church, Leicester

==== Ernest Morris window ====
The window to the left of the south door overlooking the south tower pier and the font. It is dedicated to Ernest Morris, verger of St Margaret's and tower master, who died in 1967. The image is transposed across both panels. The roundel at the top depicts the finger of God. In the upper section of the panels a banner inscribed with the first verse of Psalm 84, "How amiable are thy dwellings, O Lord of hosts." Their central section depict the art of change ringing so heavily developed at St Margaret's. At the bottom of the panel is a dedicatory inscription and three notable features of St Margaret's Church, the Sanctuary knocker, the church from the east with its tower, chancel, and porch, and the 8 sided baptismal font. It also depicts Ernest's love for collecting horse brasses.

== Organ ==
The organ dates from 1773 but is now much enlarged. A specification of the organ can be found on the National Pipe Organ Register.

=== Organists ===
- 1785–1845 Ann Valentine
- 1845–1897 George Augustus Löhr

== Bells ==
The tower of St Margaret's contains a ring of 14 bells, including a flat sixth.

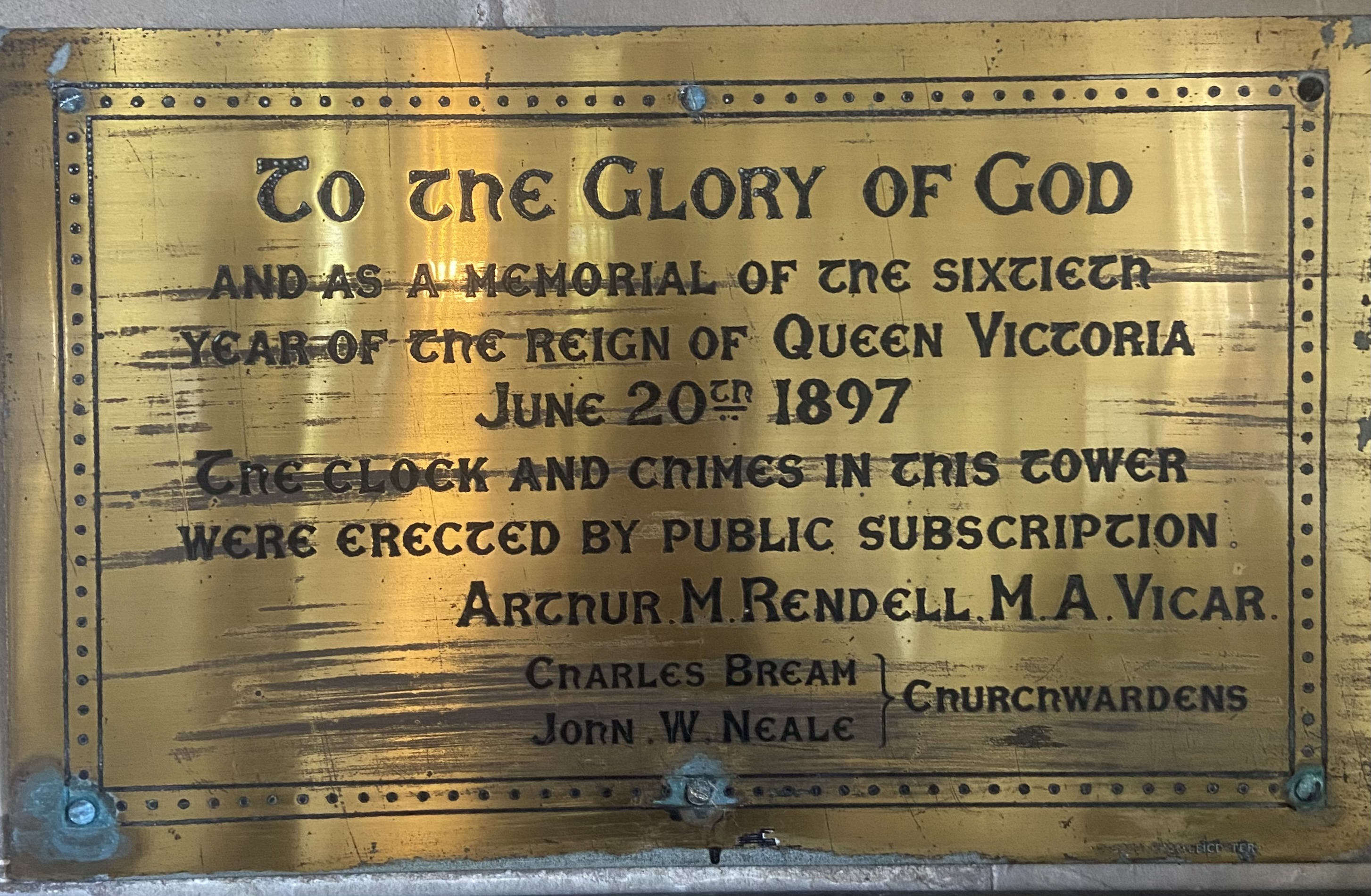
Clock dedication plaque.

== Churchyard ==
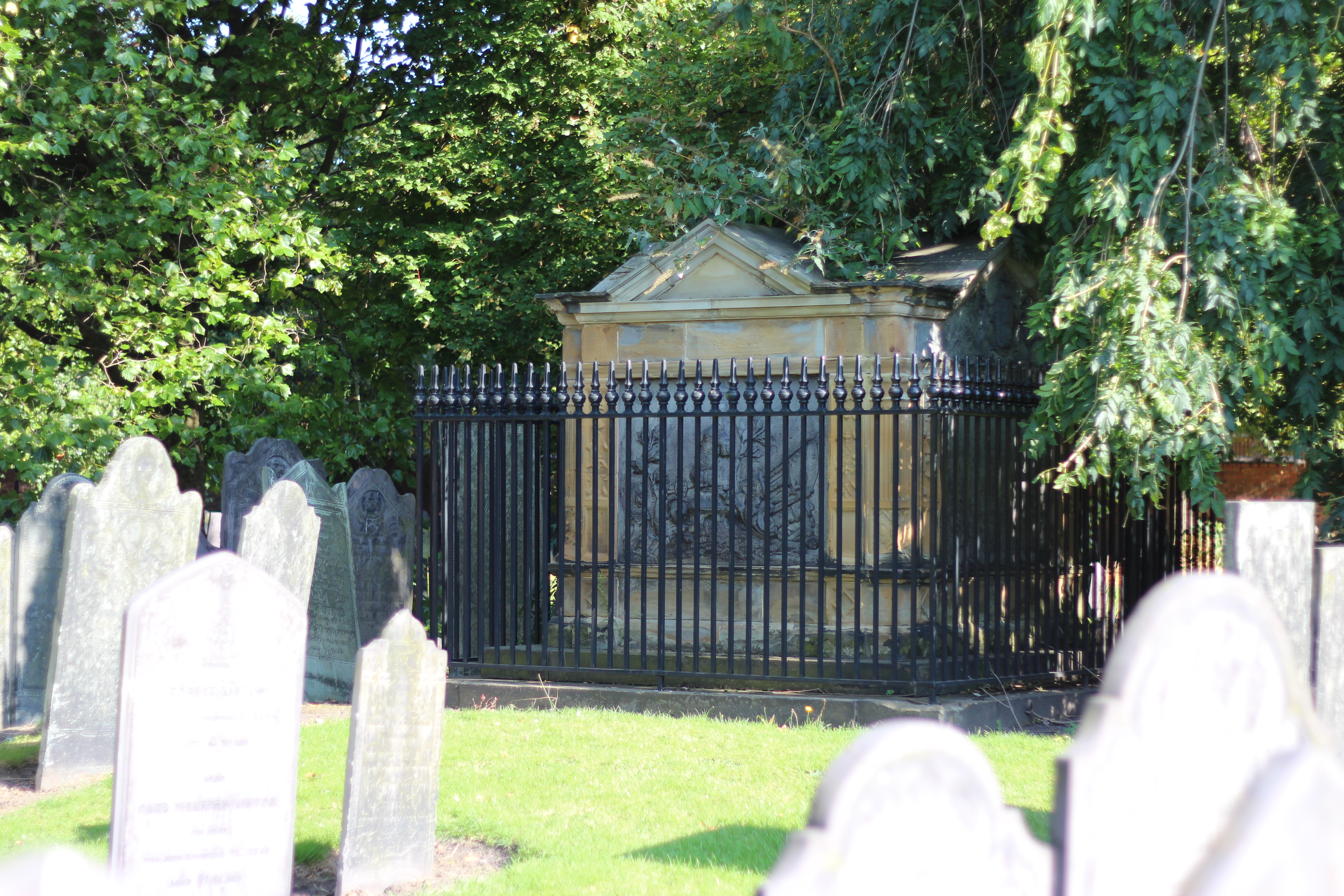
Rollo's tomb in the churchyard

The churchyard is the largest in Leicester and perhaps its oldest given the churches establishment on a Roman cemetery. It contains the 1765 tomb of Andrew Rollo, 5th Lord Rollo. The Doric, Grade II* listed structure is faced with slate relief sculptures.

== List of Rectors and Prebendaries ==
=== Earliest Rectors ===
- Ranulph, 1092 (first Archdeacon of Leicester)
- Godfrey, 1100
- Walter, 1120
- Robert of Rolverstone, 1191
- Robert de Chesney, 1140
- Hugh Barre, 1151
- Baldric de Segillo, 1158

=== Prebendaries ===
- William of Blois, 1199-1203 (afterwards Bishop of Lincoln)
- Reginald, 1204 (styled Rector)
- Jocelin, 1205 (afterwards Bishop of Bath and Wells)
- Raymond, 1214 (styled Rector)
- Robert Grosseteste, 1229 (afterwards Bishop of Lincoln)
- William de Dratton, 1232 (styled Rector)
- John of Winton (Winchester), 1235
- John of Basingstoke, 1236
- Solomon of Dover, 1252 (styled Rector)
- Roger de Saxenhurst (Archdeaon of Leicester, c. 1274), 1275

=== Prebendaries and Rectors (St Margaret's a vicarage from 1277) ===
- Roger Martival (Archdeacon), 1294 (afterwards Bishop of Salisbury)
- John Maunsell, 1295
- Adam of Limbergh (?Limbury, Lincolnshire), 1339
- John Comenges, Cardinal, 1339–43
- John of Edington, 1349
- Thomas of Estesle, 1365
- John of Appleby (previously Prebendary of St Paul's, London), 1367
- Thomas Brightwell (Dean of Leicester college), 1380
- Thomas Barnett or Bennet, LL.D., 1390
- Richard Younge, LL. D., 1391 (afterwards Bishop of Bangor)
- Thomas More, 1399 (later Dean of St Paul's 1406–1421)
- Thomas Barnsley (Archdeacon), 1421
- Reginald Kentwode (Dean of St Paul's, London), 1437
- John Walpole, 1441
- William Biconell, 1445
- John Wardhall, LL. D., 1448
- Roger Rotherham (Archdeacon of Rochester), 1472
- John Blackhall or Blackwyn, M.A., 1473
- Geoffrey Simeon, 1484 (afterwards Chancellor of Lincoln)
- Simon Stallworth, 1485
- Robert Money, Moine, or Mome, 1491
- John Cutler or Cotteler, 1502
- Richard Dudley, M.A., 1508
- Henry Morgan, LL.D., 1536 (Bishop of St David's, 1554)
- John Lound(e) or Londe, LL. B., 1560
- Thomas Todde, 1578
- Henry Ince 1581
- John Robinson (Precentor of Lincoln), 1581–97
- George Eland (afterwards Chancellor of Lincoln), 1604
- Richard Clayton (Master of St John's, Cambridge; Dean of Peterborough; Archdeacon of Lincoln), 1605
- Thomas Turner (afterwards Dean of Canterbury, a faithful follower of Charles I during the days of the Civil War), 1612
- John Walcot, M.A. (Rector of Keyston, Huntingdonshire), 1618
- Nathanael Ward, 1660
- Edward Boteler, M.A. (Rector of Winteringham, Lincolnshire), 1668
- Nicholas Stratford (afterwards Bishop of Chester), 1670
- John Gosling, M.A. (Royal Chaplain; Vicar of Littlebourn, Kent), 1689
- Thomas Geary, M.A., 1733
- Andrew Burnaby, M.A. (Rector of Asfordby), 1737
- Robert Burnaby, LL.B. (Andrew Burnaby's son and brother of Andrew Burnaby, Archdeacon of Leicester), 1767
- John Palmer, 1807
- J. Hobart Seymour, Bart., 1827-80 (last Prebendary who was incumbent of the living)

== List of Vicars ==
- Robert Grosseteste, 1225
- John of Winton, 1235
- Walter of Bornington, 1276
- Robert of Kareby, 1284
- Walter of Brompton, 1286
- William of Aston, 1297
- William of Leghton, 1305
- William of Covele, 1325
- Ralph Attwell of Shulton, 1349
- Alexander Chace, 1359
- John Warrock, 1400
- Richard Chubb, 1405
- Richard Streynsall or Styngethall (?Strenshall), 1427
- Robert Bytham, 1428
- John Bower, 1430
- Nicholas Hungarton, 1433
- John Lewin, 1433
- Robert Power, 1438
- John Bayhawe, 1475
- John Sywell, 1481
- Richard Ovendon, 1483
- John Aynsworth, 1498
- Thomas Gasgylle, 1501
- Nicholas Goodyere, 1407
- William Gilbert, D. D., 1424
- Thomas Cysson, 1504
- Thomas Nesson, 1534
- William Bailey, 1543
- Harry Fisher, 1546
- Nicholas Harwar, 1548
- John Lounde, 1568
- Michael Wickham, 1575
- Henry Ince, 1602
- William Rudyard, 1603
- Edward Gatley, 1604
- Edward Blount, M.A., 1615
- Edward Mackernes, 1645
- Mr London, 1646
- John Dutton, 1650
- Seth Wood, 1653
- Young Dixie, 1657
- Mr Inge, 1658
- John Newton, 1663
- William Simms, 1669
- Thomas Stanhope, 1669
- Nicholas Stratford, M.A., 1670
- Francis Sawyer, 1674
- Samuel Sherwyn, 1683
- Thomas Thirlby, 1690
- John Kilby, 1702
- Joseph Kilby, M.A., 1730
- Andrew Burnaby, M.A., 1738
- Robert Burnaby, LL.B., 1763
- Thomas Burnaby, M.A., 1789
- Andrew Irvine, 1830 (recommended by Duke of Wellington; housemaster, Charterhouse school, Chaplain to the Tower of London 1829)
- William Anderdon, 1846-50 (followed his uncle, Cardinal Manning, into the Roman Church; noted preacher and writer)
- Timothy Jones, 1852
- Lewis Clayton, 1875 (Suffragan Bishop of Leicester, 1903)
- James Thomas Hayes, 1888 (afterwards Bishop of Trinidad)
- Arthur Bendell, 1889
- Ambrose Lethbridge, 1908
- Francis Payne, Canon, 1911
- Thomas Arnold Lee, 1923
- Harold Hurst, 1927
- Louis George Buchanan, 1931
- Kenneth Parsons, 1933
- Eric Ducker, Canon, 1938
- Douglas Nudds, 1968
- Osmond Shirley Bennett, 1972–1992
- Ian Phelps, 1992
- Peter Naylor, 1993
- Michael Peers, 1997
- David Berryman, 1998–2000
- Interregnum, 2000–2002
- Barry Naylor, 2002

== See also ==
- All Saints Church, Leicester
- Church of St Mary de Castro, Leicester
- Leicester Cathedral (formerly St Martins Parish Church)
- St Nicholas Church, Leicester
