= Archdeacon of Loughborough =

Church of England ecclesiastical office

The Archdeacon of Loughborough is a senior ecclesiastical officer within the Diocese of Leicester. The archdeaconry was created within the Diocese of Peterborough and from the Archdeaconry of Leicester on 25 February 1921 but became part of the new Diocese of Leicester upon its creation on 12 November 1926.

The Archdeacon is responsible for the disciplinary supervision of the clergy within the area deaneries: Akeley East, Akeley South, Akeley West, Guthlaxton, Sparkenhoe East and Sparkenhoe West.

Claire Wood became the Archdeacon of Loughborough on 8 October 2017.

== List of archdeacons ==
- 1921–1921 (res.): Charles Boucher
- 1921–15 November 1922 (d.): Percy Bowers
- 1923–1940 (ret.): William Hurrell (afterwards archdeacon emeritus)
- 1940–1953 (ret.): William Lyon (afterwards archdeacon emeritus)
- 1953–1963 (res.): Berkeley Cole
- 1963–1986 (ret.): Harold Lockley (afterwards archdeacon emeritus)
- 1986–1992 (ret.): Hughie Jones (afterwards archdeacon emeritus)
- 1992–2005 (ret.): Ian Stanes (afterwards archdeacon emeritus)
- 2005–2009 (res.): Paul Hackwood
- 2009 – 27 March 2017 (ret.): David Newman
- 28 February – 8 October 2017: Sue Field, acting archdeacon and Diocesan Director of Ordinands
- 8 October 2017 – present: Claire Wood
