= Percy Harris =

Percy Harris is the name of:

- Percy Harris (lawyer) (1925–2022), British barrister
- Percy Harris (politician) (1876–1952), British politician

== See also ==
- Percy Harris Bowers, Anglican priest
- Percy Harrison (disambiguation)
- Percy Wyn-Harris (1903–1979), English mountaineer and colonial administrator
