= Henry Pownall =

British Lieutenant-General

Lieutenant-General Sir Henry Pownall KCB KBE DSO & Bar MC
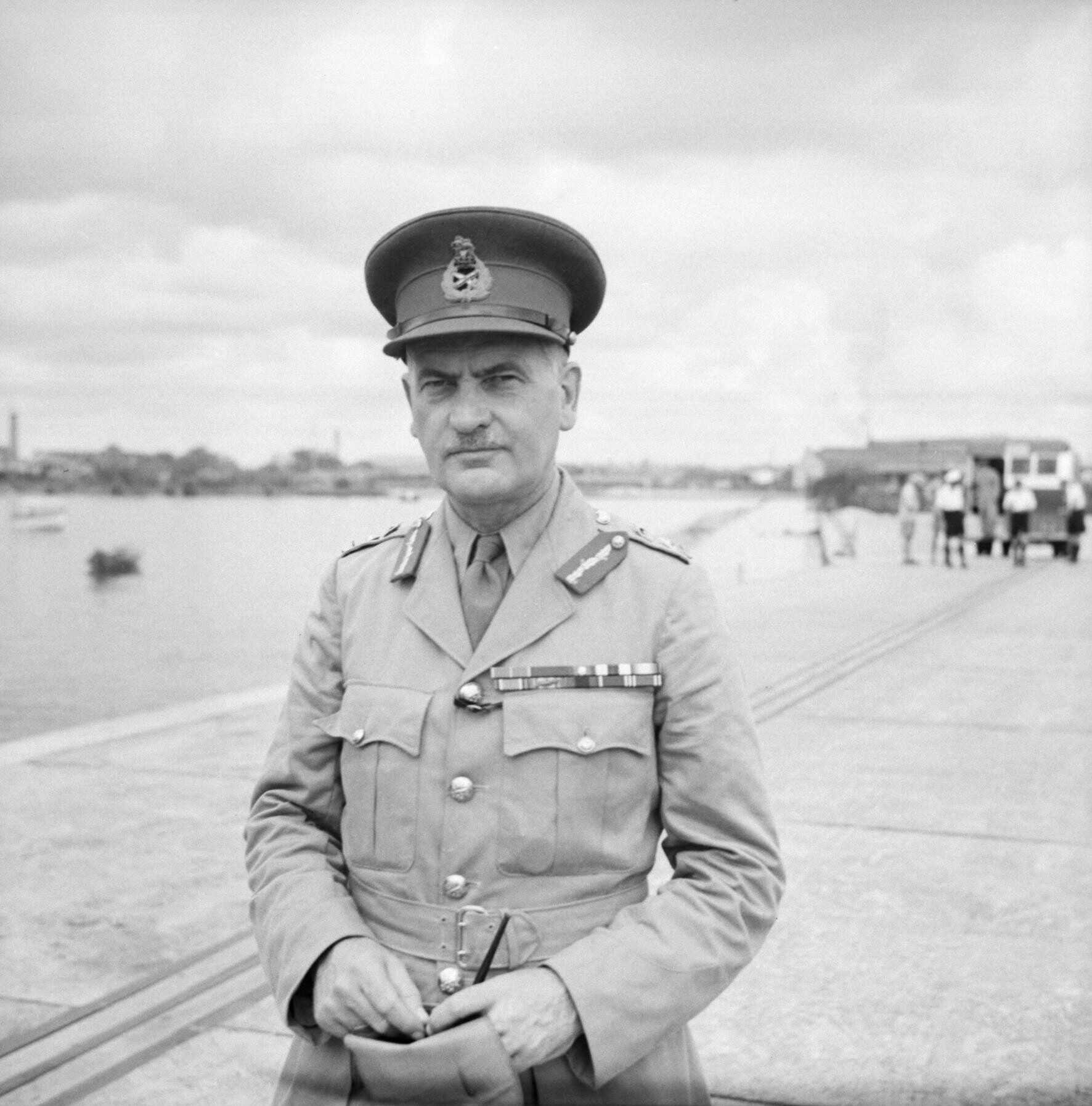
- Pownall in 1941
- Born: 19 November 1887; London, England
- Died: 10 June 1961 (aged 73); London, England
- Relatives: Willoughby Gray (stepson); Assheton Pownall (grandfather); Sir Assheton Pownall (brother)
- Military career
- Allegiance: United Kingdom
- Branch: British Army
- Service years: 1906–1945
- Rank: Lieutenant-General
- Service number: 3553
- Units: Royal Field Artillery; Royal Artillery
- Commands: Persia and Iraq Command (1943); Commander-in-Chief, Ceylon (1942–1943); Far East Command (1941–1942); British Troops in Northern Ireland (1940–1941); Royal School of Artillery (1936–1938)
- Conflicts: First World War; North-West Frontier; Second World War
- Awards: Knight Commander of the Order of the Bath; Knight Commander of the Order of the British Empire; Distinguished Service Order & Bar; Military Cross; Mentioned in Despatches (4); Order of Orange-Nassau (Netherlands)

Lieutenant-General Sir Henry Royds Pownall, KCB, KBE, DSO & Bar, MC (19 November 1887 – 10 June 1961) was a senior British Army officer who held several command and staff positions during the Second World War. In particular, he was chief of staff to the British Expeditionary Force (BEF) in France and Belgium until the battle of France in May/June 1940. He was later chief of staff to General Sir Archibald Wavell until the fall of Singapore in February 1942, and was then chief of staff to Admiral Lord Louis Mountbatten in South East Asia in 1943–1944.

== Early career ==
Henry Royds Pownall was born in London on 19 November 1887, the second son of Charles Assheton Whately Pownall and his wife, Dora Bourne Royds. His brother was Sir Assheton Pownall and his Grandfather The Ven. Assheton Pownall Archdeacon of Leicester. His father Charles Pownall was a consulting engineer with the Japanese railways, and Pownall lived in Japan from when he was three until he was eight years old. He received his education at Rugby School and Royal Military Academy, Woolwich. and was commissioned as a second lieutenant in the Royal Field Artillery on 20 December 1906. He began his military service with the Royal Horse Artillery, where he was stationed at Lucknow with U Battery. He was promoted to lieutenant on 20 December 1909.

== First World War ==
During the First World War, Pownall served on the Western Front in France and Belgium. He was promoted to captain on 30 October 1914, and awarded the Military Cross on 1 January 1917. and major on 31 March 1917. He was Brigade Major, Royal Artillery, of the 17th Division from 12 April 1917 to 12 March 1919. For his service during the war he was twice mentioned in despatches, and awarded the Distinguished Service Order on 1 January 1918.

== Interbellum ==
On 10 December 1918, Pownall married Lucy Louttit, the widow of Captain John Gray, a British Indian Army officer of the 36th Sikhs who had been killed in the siege of Kut Al Amara in 1916. They had no children, but he acquired a stepson, Willoughby Gray, through his marriage.

Pownall attended the Staff College, Camberley from 1920 to 1921, and then served as a brigade major at the School of Artillery in Larkhill from 1924 to 1925. He continued his training and education as General Staff Officer (Grade 2) at the Staff College, Camberley from 1926 to 1929, where he became a brevet lieutenant-colonel on 3 January 1928. After completing his training at Staff College he took part in operations on the north west frontier of India through 1931, for which he was mentioned in despatches a third time, and awarded a bar to his Distinguished Service Order.

Pownall attended the Imperial Defence College in 1932, and, following this, he held a series of staff appointments, serving as the Military Assistant Secretary for the Committee of Imperial Defence from 1933 to 1935, then as Deputy Secretary for the Committee of Imperial Defence in 1936. His rank of lieutenant-colonel became substantive on 31 January 1935, and he was promoted to colonel on 1 May 1935, with his seniority backdated to 1 January 1932. From 1936 to 1938, he was Commandant of the Royal School of Artillery, with the rank of brigadier from 15 September 1936. As the threat of war grew, he was Director of Military Operations and Intelligence in the War Office from 1938 to 1939. He was promoted to major-general on 26 March 1938.

== Second World War ==
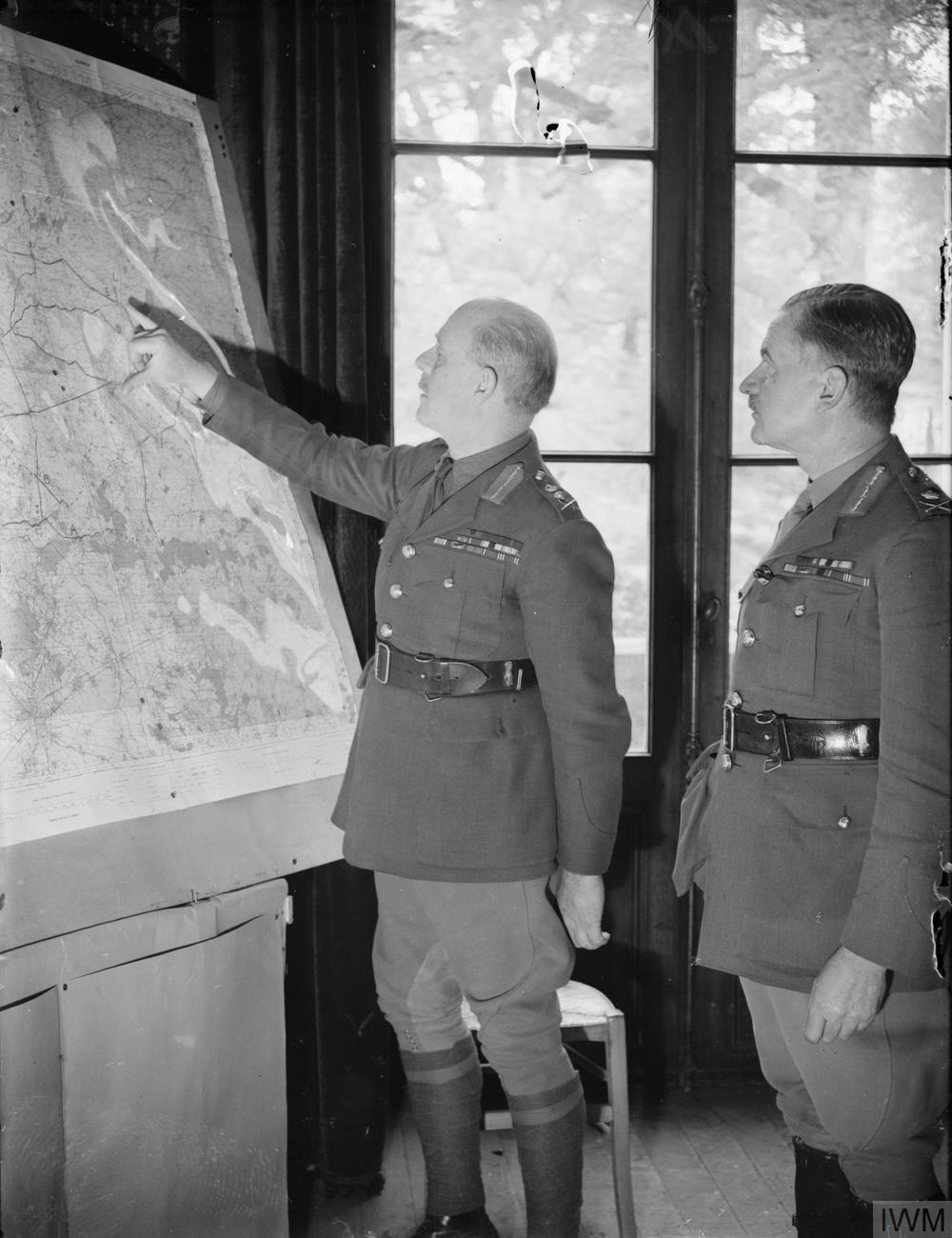
Pownall (right) and Lord Gort study a map at GHQ in the Chateau at Habarcq, 26 November 1939

Britain entered the war on 3 September 1939, and the following day Pownall was appointed Chief of General Staff of the British Expeditionary Force (BEF), with the acting rank of lieutenant-general. He served in this capacity in France and Belgium until after the fall of France in June 1940, He was made a Knight Commander of the Order of the British Empire on 11 July 1940, and again mentioned in despatches.

Pownall then assumed the position of inspector general for the recently created Home Guard and was Commander of British Troops in Northern Ireland, before being appointed the Vice Chief of the Imperial General Staff (VCIGS) in the War Office in 1941. It was rumoured that he might succeed Field Marshal Sir John Dill as Chief of the Imperial General Staff (CIGS), but this did not occur, Winston Churchill wanted to appoint Major-General Archibald Nye, but Nye managed to persuade him to appoint General Sir Alan Brooke. Whereupon Nye was appointed VCIGS.

Pownall became commander-in-chief of the British Far East Command in South East Asia from December 1941 until 1942, which did not achieve anything of note when it was succeeded by the short-lived ABDACOM, and he became chief of staff to General Sir Archibald Wavell. His rank of lieutenant-general became substantive on 17 January 1942. For this service, he was mentioned in despatches once more, and he was made a Grand Officer of the Order of Orange-Nassau by Queen Wilhelmina of the Netherlands.

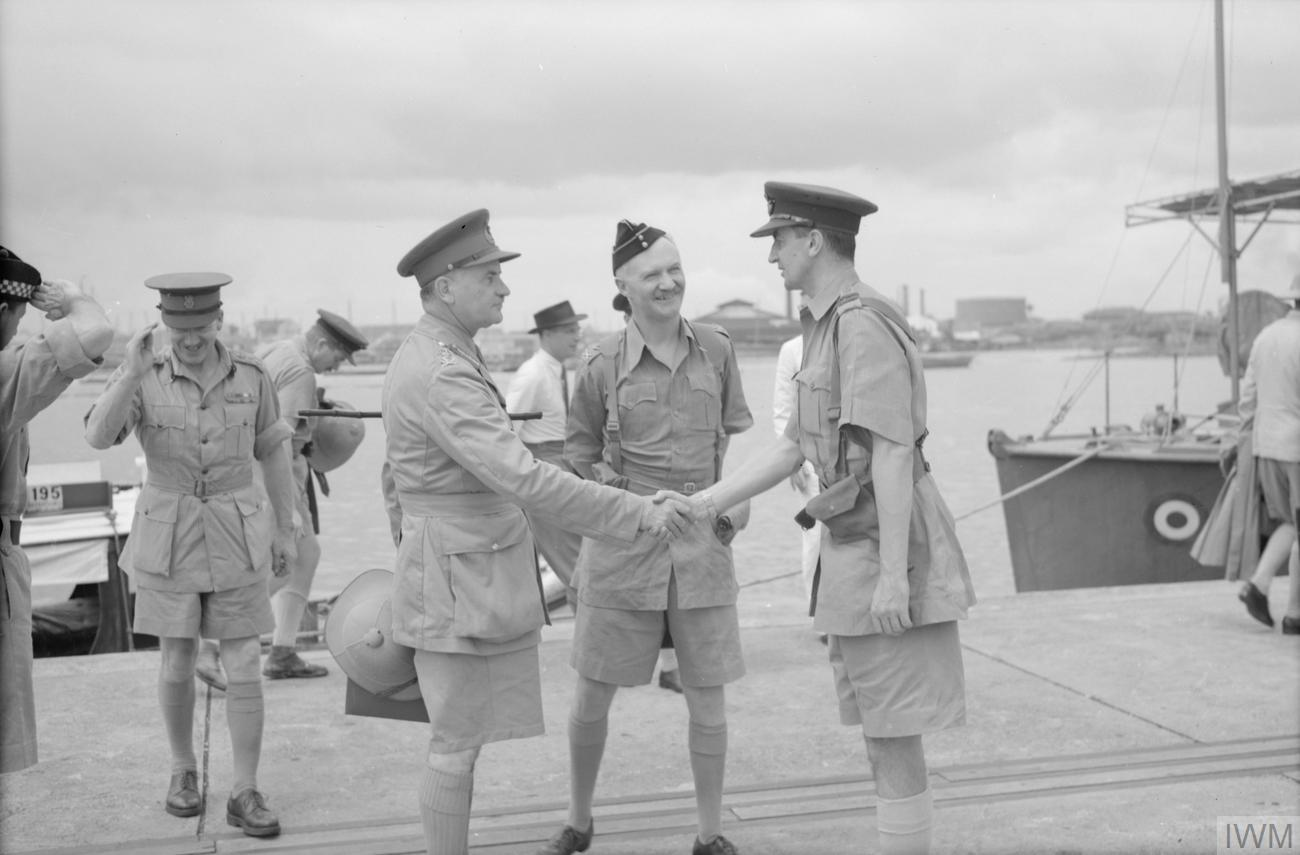
Pownall arrives at Singapore to take up his appointment as C-in-C Far East, December 1941.

After ABDACOM was dissolved in February 1942, Pownall assumed the role of Commander-in-Chief, Ceylon, and then became commander-in-chief of the Persia and Iraq theatres in 1943. Finally, he was chief of staff to Vice Admiral Louis Mountbatten, the Supreme Commander of the Allied South East Asia Command from 1943 to 1944. He had an operation to remove a kidney stone on 12 August 1944 and did not return to duty until October. Mountbatten had doubts about Pownall's health and asked for a replacement. He handed over to Lieutenant-General Frederick Browning in December 1944.

Pownall was made a Knight Commander of the Order of the Bath in the 1945 New Year Honours on 1 January 1945, but never held another command. He retired from the British Army on 8 September 1945.

== Post war ==
After the war, Pownall was chairman of Friary Meux Limited and a member of the committee of Lloyds Bank. He was the Chief Commissioner of the St. John Ambulance Brigade from 1947 to 1949, and became the chancellor of the Order of St John in 1951. He served as a military consultant on the writing of Churchill's The Second World War from 1948 to 1954.

Pownall died in London on 10 June 1961, aged 73. His papers are in the Liddell Hart Centre for Military Archives.

== Notes ==
Military offices
Preceded by Douglas Malise Graham	Commandant of the School of Artillery, Larkhill; 1936–1938	Succeeded by Sydney Rigby Wason
Preceded by Robert Haining	Director of Military Operations and Intelligence; 1938–1939	Succeeded by Richard Dewing (as Director of Military Operations); Frederick Beaumont-Nesbitt (as Director of Military Intelligence)
Preceded by Sir Robert Haining	Vice Chief of the Imperial General Staff; May – December 1941	Succeeded by Sir Archibald Nye
Preceded by Sir Robert Brooke-Popham	C-in-C Far East Command; 1941–1942	Post disestablished Command absorbed by ABDACOM
