= Lewisham East (UK Parliament constituency) =

UK Parliament constituency (since 1974)

- Borough constituency for the House of Commons
- Interactive map of boundaries from 2024
- Location within Greater London
- County: Greater London
- Electorate: 71,706 (2023)
- Major settlements: Catford, Blackheath

Current constituency
- Created: 1974
- Member of Parliament: Janet Daby (Labour)
- Seats: One
- Created from: Lewisham North and Lewisham South

1918–1950
- Created from: Lewisham
- Replaced by: Lewisham North and Lewisham South

Lewisham East is a parliamentary constituency in South London represented in the House of Commons of the UK Parliament since the by-election on 14 June 2018 by Janet Daby of the Labour Party.

== Constituency profile ==
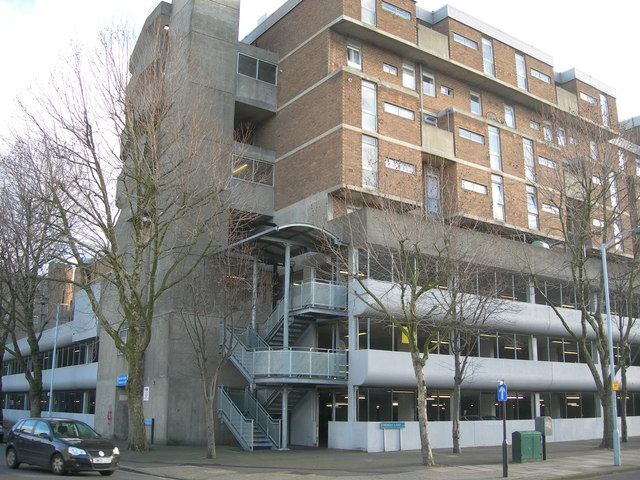
Milford Tower, Catford, located in the constituency

Lewisham East is a mostly suburban constituency in the Borough of Lewisham in Greater London. It covers the neighbourhoods of Catford, Hither Green, Southend, Grove Park and part of Lee. The area was mostly rural during the 19th century and contains some Victorian era housing, but was developed into suburbs in the early 20th century. Lee has average levels of wealth but the rest of the constituency has high levels of deprivation. House prices are lower than the London average.

In general, residents of Lewisham East are young, have average levels of education and have low rates of homeownership. Household income is below the London average and a high proportion of residents work in health, education and the public sector. The percentage of people claiming unemployment benefits is nearly double the nationwide figure. White people made up 49% of residents at the 2021 census. Black people were the largest ethnic minority group at 29%, including large Jamaican and Nigerian communities. Asians made up 9% of the population. At the local borough council, all seats in the constituency are represented by Labour Party councillors. An estimated 60% of voters in Lewisham East supported remaining in the European Union in the 2016 referendum, the same percentage as London as a whole and higher than the nationwide figure of 48%.

== History ==
Lewisham East was created for the 1918 general election. From 1945 to 1950 the seat was represented by cabinet minister Herbert Morrison of the Labour Party, who took the seat from its first MP, Conservative Assheton Pownall, a former army officer.

The seat was abolished in 1950 but recreated in 1974. From 1979 to 1997 the constituency was a marginal seat. The MP from 1983 to 1992 was Minister for Sport Colin Moynihan (Conservative). Since the 1997 general election the seat has swung towards Labour; in 2014 Labour won a landslide victory at the local council elections, with the Liberal Democrats losing ten seats and the Conservatives losing their only remaining councillor, while Steve Bullock was re-elected as the directly elected mayor of Lewisham, having held the office since its creation in 2002. Lewisham East had the 51st largest Labour vote share in the country at the 2015 election, out of 650 constituencies.

== Boundaries ==
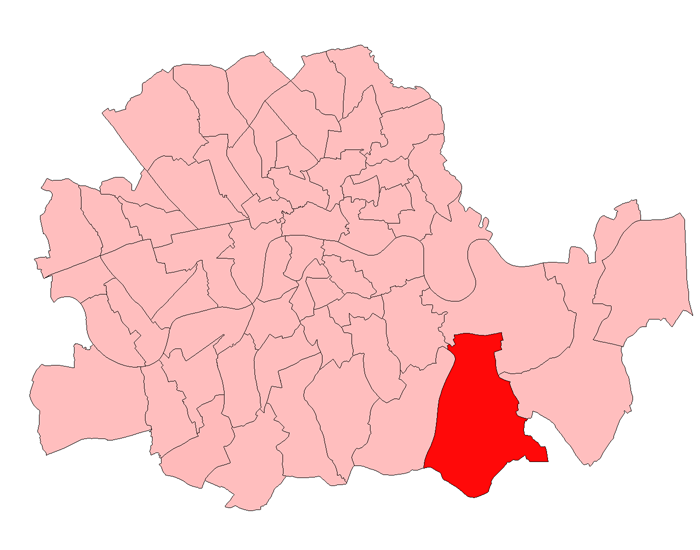
Lewisham East in London 1918–50

Borough wards' map, 1916 (which includes the 1918-created seat and that to the west)

Map of boundaries 2010–2024

1918–1950: The Metropolitan Borough of Lewisham wards of Blackheath, Church, Lewisham Park, Manor, and South, and parts of the wards of Catford and Lewisham Village.

1974–1983: The London Borough of Lewisham wards of Blackheath and Lewisham Village, Grove Park, Lewisham Park, Manor Lee, St Andrew, St Mildred Lee, South Lee, Southend, and Whitefoot.

1983–2010: The London Borough of Lewisham wards of Blackheath, Churchdown, Downham, Grove Park, Hither Green, Manor Lee, St Margaret, St Mildred, and Whitefoot.

2010–2024: The London Borough of Lewisham wards of Blackheath, Catford South, Downham, Grove Park, Lee Green, Rushey Green, and Whitefoot.

The 2010 redrawing of boundaries replaced Lewisham West with a cross-borough constituency, Lewisham West and Penge, requiring changes to the other seats in the borough.

- Lewisham East received:
  - Catford South, and parts of Rushey Green and Whitefoot wards from the former constituency of Lewisham West.
  - Part of Rushey Green from Lewisham Deptford
- Lewisham East lost:
  - Part of Lewisham Central to Lewisham Deptford.

2010–2024: The London Borough of Lewisham wards of Bellingham, Catford South, Downham, Grove Park, Hither Green, Lee Green, and Rushey Green.

Contents reflect new ward structure which became effective in May 2022. Blackheath ward was transferred to the re-established constituency of Lewisham North, offset by the gain of Bellingham ward from the abolished constituency of Lewisham West and Penge.

== Members of Parliament ==
Election	Member	Party
1918	Assheton Pownall	Conservative
1945	Herbert Morrison	Labour
1950	constituency abolished	
Feb 1974	constituency recreated	
Feb 1974	Roland Moyle	Labour
1983	Colin Moynihan	Conservative
1992	Bridget Prentice	Labour
2010	Heidi Alexander	Labour
2018 by-election	Janet Daby	Labour

== Election results ==
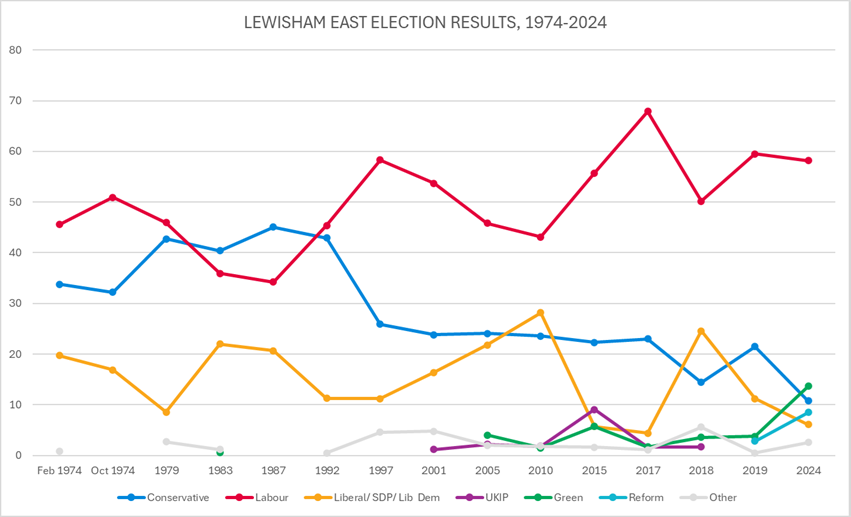
Election results 1974-2024

=== Elections in the 2020s ===
General election 2024: Lewisham East
Party	Candidate	Votes	%	±%
Labour	Janet Daby	23,646	58.2	−4.5
Green	Mike Herron	5,573	13.7	+10.2
Conservative	Louise Brice	4,401	10.8	−9.2
Reform	Ruth Handyside	3,469	8.5	+5.9
Liberal Democrats	Callum Littlemore	2,471	6.1	−4.0
Workers Party	Steph Koffi	577	1.4	N/A
CPA	Maureen Martin	404	1.0	+0.4
Shared Ground	Richard Galloway	96	0.2	N/A
Majority		18,073	44.5	+1.8
Turnout		40,637	55.4	−9.9
Registered electors		73,376		
Labour hold		Swing	–7.4	

=== Elections in the 2010s ===
2019 notional result
Party	Vote	%
Labour	29,344	62.7
Conservative	9,365	20.0
Liberal Democrats	4,736	10.1
Green	1,653	3.5
Brexit Party	1,212	2.6
Others	522	1.1
Turnout	46,832	65.3
Electorate	71,706	

General election 2019: Lewisham East
Party	Candidate	Votes	%	±%
Labour	Janet Daby	26,661	59.5	−8.6
Conservative	Sam Thurgood	9,653	21.5	−1.5
Liberal Democrats	Ade Fatukasi	5,039	11.2	+6.8
Green	Rosamund Kissi-Debrah	1,706	3.8	+2.1
Brexit Party	Wesley Pollard	1,234	2.8	N/A
CPA	Maureen Martin	277	0.6	+0.2
Independent	Mark Barber	152	0.3	N/A
Young People's	Richard Galloway	50	0.1	N/A
Independent	Roger Mighton	43	0.1	N/A
Majority		17,008	38.0	−6.9
Turnout		44,815	66.0	−3.3
Registered electors		67,857		
Labour hold		Swing	—3.5	

2018 Lewisham East by-election
Party	Candidate	Votes	%	±%
Labour	Janet Daby	11,033	50.2	−17.7
Liberal Democrats	Lucy Salek	5,404	24.6	+20.2
Conservative	Ross Archer	3,161	14.4	−8.6
Green	Rosamund Kissi-Debrah	788	3.6	+1.9
Women's Equality	Mandu Reid	506	2.3	N/A
UKIP	David Kurten	380	1.7	+0.1
For Britain	Anne Marie Waters	266	1.2	N/A
CPA	Maureen Martin	168	0.8	+0.4
Monster Raving Loony	Howling Laud Hope	93	0.4	N/A
Democrats and Veterans	Massimo DiMambro	67	0.3	N/A
Libertarian	Sean Finch	38	0.2	N/A
Access to the Law for All	Charles Carey	37	0.2	N/A
Radical	Patrick Gray	20	0.1	N/A
Young People's	Thomas Hall	18	0.1	N/A
Majority		5,629	25.6	−19.3
Turnout		22,056	33.3	−36.0
Registered electors		66,140		
Labour hold		Swing	–19.0	

General election 2017: Lewisham East
Party	Candidate	Votes	%	±%
Labour	Heidi Alexander	32,072	67.9	+12.2
Conservative	Peter Fortune	10,859	23.0	+0.7
Liberal Democrats	Emily Frith	2,086	4.4	–1.3
Green	Störm Poorun	803	1.7	–4.0
UKIP	Keith Forster	798	1.7	−7.4
Independent	Willow Winston	355	0.8	N/A
CPA	Maureen Martin	228	0.5	–0.2
Majority		21,123	44.9	+11.5
Turnout		47,201	69.3	+5.1
Registered electors		68,124		
Labour hold		Swing	+5.8	

General election 2015: Lewisham East
Party	Candidate	Votes	%	±%
Labour	Heidi Alexander	23,907	55.7	+12.6
Conservative	Peter Fortune	9,574	22.3	−1.3
UKIP	Anne Marie Waters	3,886	9.1	+7.2
Liberal Democrats	Julia Fletcher	2,455	5.7	–22.4
Green	Störm Poorun	2,429	5.7	+4.2
People Before Profit	Nick Long	390	0.9	+0.1
CPA	Maureen Martin	282	0.7	N/A
Majority		14,333	33.4	+18.5
Turnout		42,923	64.1	+0.9
Registered electors		66,913		
Labour hold		Swing	+6.9	

General election 2010: Lewisham East
Party	Candidate	Votes	%	±%
Labour	Heidi Alexander	17,966	43.1	–4.4
Liberal Democrats	Pete Pattisson	11,750	28.2	+7.8
Conservative	Jonathan Clamp	9,850	23.6	−0.8
UKIP	Roderick Reed	771	1.8	−0.4
Green	Priscilla Cotterell	624	1.5	−2.7
English Democrat	James Rose	426	1.0	N/A
People Before Profit	George Hallam	332	0.8	N/A
Majority		6,216	14.9	–8.2
Turnout		41,719	63.3	+7.5
Registered electors		65,926		
Labour hold		Swing	-6.1	

=== Elections in the 2000s ===
2005 notional result
Party	Vote	%
Labour	17,683	47.5
Conservative	9,077	24.4
Liberal Democrats	7,598	20.4
Others	2,881	7.7
Turnout	37,239	55.8
Electorate	66,762	

General election 2005: Lewisham East
Party	Candidate	Votes	%	±%
Labour	Bridget Prentice	14,263	45.8	−7.9
Conservative	James Cleverly	7,512	24.1	+0.3
Liberal Democrats	Richard Thomas	6,787	21.8	+5.4
Green	Anna Baker	1,243	4.0	N/A
UKIP	Arnold Tarling	697	2.2	+1.0
National Front	Bernard Franklin	625	2.0	N/A
Majority		6,751	21.7	–8.2
Turnout		31,127	56.3	+3.2
Registered electors		55,269		
Labour hold		Swing	−4.1	

General election 2001: Lewisham East
Party	Candidate	Votes	%	±%
Labour	Bridget Prentice	16,160	53.7	–4.6
Conservative	David McInnes	7,157	23.8	–2.1
Liberal Democrats	David Buxton	4,937	16.4	+5.2
BNP	Barry Roberts	1,005	3.3	N/A
Socialist Alliance	Jean Kysow	464	1.5	N/A
UKIP	Maurice Link	361	1.2	N/A
Majority		9,003	29.9	–2.5
Turnout		30,084	53.1	–13.3
Registered electors		56,657		
Labour hold		Swing	–1.2	

=== Elections in the 1990s ===
General election 1997: Lewisham East
Party	Candidate	Votes	%	±%
Labour	Bridget Prentice	21,821	58.3	+12.9
Conservative	Philip Hollobone	9,694	25.9	–16.9
Liberal Democrats	David Buxton	4,178	11.2	–0.2
Referendum	Spencer Drury	910	2.4	N/A
National Front	Robert Croucher	431	1.2	N/A
Liberal	Peter White	277	0.7	N/A
Rainbow Dream Ticket	K Rizz	97	0.3	N/A
Majority		12,127	32.4	+29.8
Turnout		37,408	66.4	−7.8
Registered electors		56,333		
Labour hold		Swing	+14.9	

1992 notional result
Party	Vote	%
Labour	19,633	45.4
Conservative	18,510	42.8
Liberal Democrats	4,935	11.4
Others	196	0.5
Turnout	43,274	75.0
Electorate	58,328	

General election 1992: Lewisham East
Party	Candidate	Votes	%	±%
Labour	Bridget Prentice	19,576	45.4	+11.2
Conservative	Colin Moynihan	18,481	42.8	–2.3
Liberal Democrats	Julian Hawkins	4,877	11.3	–9.4
Natural Law	Gilda Mansour	196	0.5	N/A
Majority		1,095	2.5	N/A
Turnout		43,128	74.8	+0.9
Registered electors		57,674		
Labour gain from Conservative		Swing	+6.7	

=== Elections in the 1980s ===
General election 1987: Lewisham East
Party	Candidate	Votes	%	±%
Conservative	Colin Moynihan	19,873	45.1	+4.8
Labour	Michael Profitt	15,059	34.2	–1.7
SDP	Vivienne Stone	9,118	20.7	–1.3
Majority		4,814	10.9	+6.4
Turnout		44,052	73.9	+4.4
Registered electors		59,627		
Conservative hold		Swing	+3.3	

General election 1983: Lewisham East
Party	Candidate	Votes	%	±%
Conservative	Colin Moynihan	17,168	40.4	−2.4
Labour	Roland Moyle	15,259	35.9	−10.1
SDP	Polly Toynbee	9,351	22.0	+13.4
BNP	Richard Edmonds	288	0.7	N/A
Ecology	Alan Hassard	270	0.6	N/A
Communist	G Roberts	135	0.3	N/A
Workers Revolutionary	P Gibson	71	0.2	−0.2
Majority		1,909	4.5	N/A
Turnout		42,538	69.5	−4.9
Registered electors		61,216		
Conservative gain from Labour		Swing	-3.8	

=== Elections in the 1970s ===
1979 notional result
Party	Vote	%
Labour	20,893	46.7
Conservative	18,814	42.0
Liberal	3,829	8.6
Others	1,219	2.7
Turnout	44,755	
Electorate		

General election 1979: Lewisham East
Party	Candidate	Votes	%	±%
Labour	Roland Moyle	22,916	46.0	–5.0
Conservative	Humfrey Malins	21,323	42.8	+10.6
Liberal	James Forrest	4,265	8.6	–8.3
National Front	Michael Ellis	1,168	2.3	N/A
Workers Revolutionary	(Grantley) Herbert Harewood	190	0.4	N/A
Majority		1,593	3.2	–15.5
Turnout		49,863	74.3	+5.6
Registered electors		67,066		
Labour hold		Swing	–7.8	

General election October 1974: Lewisham East
Party	Candidate	Votes	%	±%
Labour	Roland Moyle	24,350	50.9	+5.3
Conservative	D Mahony	15,398	32.2	–1.6
Liberal	Michael Minter	8,069	16.9	–2.9
Majority		8,952	18.7	+6.9
Turnout		47,815	68.76	–8.8
Registered electors		69,540		
Labour hold		Swing	+3.5	

General election February 1974: Lewisham East
Party	Candidate	Votes	%	±%
Labour	Roland Moyle	24,339	45.6	–9.3
Conservative	John Marshall	18,033	33.8	–11.3
Liberal	Michael Minter	10,543	19.7	N/A
Independent	C Carey	269	0.5	N/A
New Freedom	Frank Hansford-Miller	203	0.4	N/A
Majority		6,306	11.8	+2.0
Turnout		53,389	77.5	+10.0
Registered electors		68,863		
Labour hold		Swing	+1.0	

1970 notional result
Party	Vote	%
Labour	26,800	54.9
Conservative	22,000	45.1
Turnout	48,800	67.5
Electorate	72,300	

=== Elections in the 1940s ===
General election 1945: Lewisham East
Party	Candidate	Votes	%	±%
Labour	Herbert Morrison	37,361	61.82	+17.26
Conservative	Assheton Pownall	22,142	36.64	−18.80
Independent	Frederick Russell	931	1.54	new
Majority		15,219	25.18	n/a
Turnout		60,434	76.19	+8.17
Registered electors		79,318		
Labour gain from Conservative		Swing		

=== Elections in the 1930s ===
General election 1935: Lewisham East
Party	Candidate	Votes	%	±%
Conservative	Assheton Pownall	32,874	55.44	−11.43
Labour	Freda Corbet	26,425	44.56	+11.43
Majority		6,449	10.88	−22.86
Turnout		58,299	68.02	−6.84
Registered electors		87,178		
Conservative hold		Swing		

General election 1931: Lewisham East
Party	Candidate	Votes	%	±%
Conservative	Assheton Pownall	41,354	66.87	+24.47
Labour	John Wilmot	20,485	33.13	−8.57
Majority		20,869	33.74	+33.04
Turnout		61,839	74.86	+3.36
Registered electors		82,606		
Conservative hold		Swing		

=== Elections in the 1920s ===
Sir E. Penton

General election 1929: Lewisham East
Party	Candidate	Votes	%	±%
Unionist	Assheton Pownall	23,208	42.4	−21.2
Labour	John Wilmot	22,806	41.7	+5.3
Liberal	Edward Penton	8,729	15.9	N/A
Majority		402	0.7	−26.5
Turnout		54,743	71.5	−3.4
Registered electors		76,562		
Unionist hold		Swing	-13.25	

General election 1924: Lewisham East
Party	Candidate	Votes	%	±%
Unionist	Assheton Pownall	23,842	63.6	+19.2
Labour	John Wilmot	13,621	31.4	+5.0
Majority		10,221	27.2	+14.2
Turnout		37,463	74.9	+12.3
Registered electors		50,019		
Unionist hold		Swing	+7.1	

General election 1923: Lewisham East
Party	Candidate	Votes	%	±%
Unionist	Assheton Pownall	13,560	44.4	−13.2
Labour	Ernest Wesley Wilton	9,604	31.4	+2.5
Liberal	Edward Penton	7,397	24.2	+10.7
Majority		3,956	13.0	−15.7
Turnout		30,561	62.6	−1.4
Registered electors		48,812		
Unionist hold		Swing	-7.8	

General election 1922: Lewisham East
Party	Candidate	Votes	%	±%
Unionist	Assheton Pownall	16,726	57.6	N/A
Labour	Ernest Wesley Wilton	8,402	28.9	N/A
Liberal	JCL Zorn	3,906	13.5	N/A
Majority		8,324	28.7	N/A
Turnout		29,034	64.0	N/A
Registered electors		45,377		
Unionist hold		Swing	N/A	

=== Elections in the 1910s ===
General election 1918: Lewisham East
Party		Candidate	Votes	%
C	Unionist	Assheton Pownall	Unopposed	
Registered electors				
	Unionist win (new seat)			
C indicates candidate endorsed by the coalition government.

== See also ==
- List of parliamentary constituencies in London

== Bibliography ==
- Dale, Iain, ed. (2003). The Times House of Commons 1929, 1931, 1935. Politico (reprint). ISBN 9781842750339.
- The Times House of Commons 1945. 1945. OCLC 669126329.
