= Edward Penton =

British clothing administrator and Liberal Party politician

Sir Edward Penton

Sir Edward Penton KBE (18 June 1875 – 21 December 1967) was a British Clothing administrator and Liberal Party politician who was Mayor of St Marylebone.

== Background ==
Penton was born the eldest son of Edward Penton. He was educated at Rugby School and New College, Oxford, where he received an Honours History School, BA in 1897. In 1902 he married Eleanor Sharpe. They had four sons and three daughters. He was knighted in 1918.

== Professional career ==
Penton was Superintendent of the Royal Army Clothing Department (Boot Section) from 1914–19. He was Chief Inspector of Clothing for the Central Ordnance Depot at Branston, Burton-on-Trent, until 30 June 1946. He then acted as Secretary to the Commonwealth Conference on design, development and inspection of Stores and clothing.

== Political career ==
Penton was elected to the council of the Metropolitan Borough of St Marylebone. From 1912-1913 he served as the mayor of Marylebone. In 1913 he became an Alderman of the council. He was Liberal candidate for the Tiverton division of Devon at the 1918 general election. His Unionist opponent was endorsed by the Coalition Government, and Penton came second. He was Liberal candidate for the Lewisham East division at the 1923 and 1929 general elections. On both occasions he came third. He did not stand for parliament again.

=== Electoral record ===
General election 1918: Tiverton
Party	Candidate	Votes	%	±%
Unionist	Charles Robert Sydenham Carew	9,598	57.2	
Liberal	Sir Edward Penton	4,827	28.7	
Labour	Donald Fraser	2,377	14.1	
Majority		4,771	28.5	
Turnout			64.8	
Unionist hold		Swing		

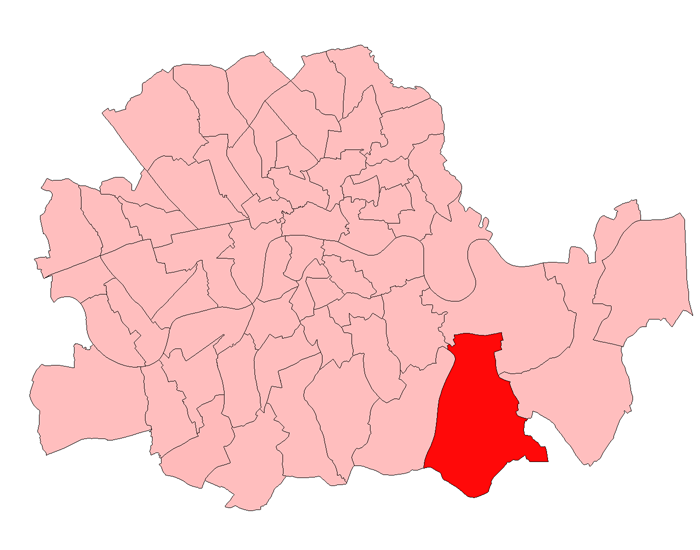
Lewisham East in the County of London in 1923 and 1929

General election 1923: Lewisham East
Party	Candidate	Votes	%	±%
Unionist	Assheton Pownall	13,560	44.4	−13.2
Labour	Ernest Wesley Wilton	9,604	31.4	+2.5
Liberal	Sir Edward Penton	7,397	24.2	+10.7
Majority		3,956	13.0	−15.7
Turnout		30,561	62.6	−1.4
Unionist hold		Swing	-7.8	

General election 1929: Lewisham East
Party	Candidate	Votes	%	±%
Unionist	Assheton Pownall	23,208	42.4	
Labour	John Charles Wilmot	22,806	41.7	
Liberal	Sir Edward Penton	8,729	15.9	n/a
Majority		402	0.7	
Turnout				
Unionist hold		Swing		
