= Thomas Bonney =

Thomas Bonney may refer to:

- Thomas George Bonney (1833–1923), English geologist
- Thomas Bonney (priest) (1782–1863), Archdeacon of Leicester
