= Cecil Matthews (priest) =

The Venerable Cecil Lloyd Matthews MA

Archdeacon of Leicester
- In office 1938–1956

Personal details
- Born: 8 February 1881
- Died: 26 February 1962 (aged 81)
- Spouse: Ennis née Beddoe

The Venerable Cecil Lloyd Matthews (1881–1962) was an eminent Anglican priest and author in the mid 20th century.

Matthews was educated at Monmouth Grammar School and Keble College, Oxford. In 1902-3 he was Assistant Master at The Limes Preparatory School Shrewsbury and from 1903 to 1907 was Assistant Master at Norwich School. He was ordained in 1904 and began his career with a curacy at SS Laurence and Gregory, Norwich after which he was Priest in charge at St Marks, Bourne End from 1907 to 1911. He was then Rector of Clophill and when World War I broke out a Temporary Chaplain to the Forces. When peace returned he held incumbencies at Hungarton, Hinckley and Knighton. He was Rural Dean of Christianity within the Diocese of Leicester from 1938 and from then until 1956 Archdeacon of Leicester. He retired in 1956.

== Notes ==
Church of England titles
Preceded by Frederick Brodie MacNutt	Archdeacon of Leicester; 1927–1934	Succeeded by Irven David Edwards
