= David Trimnel =

English priest; Archdeacon of Leicester

David Trimnel, D.D. (b Abbots Ripton 15 September 1675 – d Stoke Hammond 18 May 1756) was an English priest.

Trimnel was educated at New College, Oxford. He was Rector of Nuneham Courtney from 1660. He was appointed Archdeacon of Leicester in 1715 and Precentor of Lincoln Cathedral in 1718, holding both posts until his death. He had three brothers: Charles (Bishop of Norwich and of Winchester), William (Dean of Winchester), and Hugh (king's apothecary).
