= Charles Boucher (priest) =

Anglican priest

The Venerable Charles Estcourt Boucher MA

Archdeacon of Loughborough
- In office 1920–1921

Personal details
- Born: 8 June 1856
- Died: 24 February 1940 (aged 83)
- Spouse: Louisa Mary née Wright

The Venerable Charles Estcourt Boucher (1856–1940) was an eminent Anglican priest in the late 19th and early 20th centuries.

Boucher was born on 8 June 1856 at Cheddleton and educated at Uppingham and Trinity Hall, Cambridge.

He was ordained in 1879 and began his career as Curate at Northam, Devon after which he was Rector of Frolesworth, Lutterworth and Master of Chief Baron Smith's Almshouses from 1886 to 1923. An Honorary Canon of Peterborough from 1912 until 1937, he became the first Archdeacon of Loughborough in 1921.

== Notes ==
Church of England titles
Preceded by Inaugural appointment	Archdeacon of Loughborough; 1920–1921	Succeeded by Percy Harris Bowers
