= Charles Trimnell =

English bishop (1663-1723)

- Bishop of Winchester
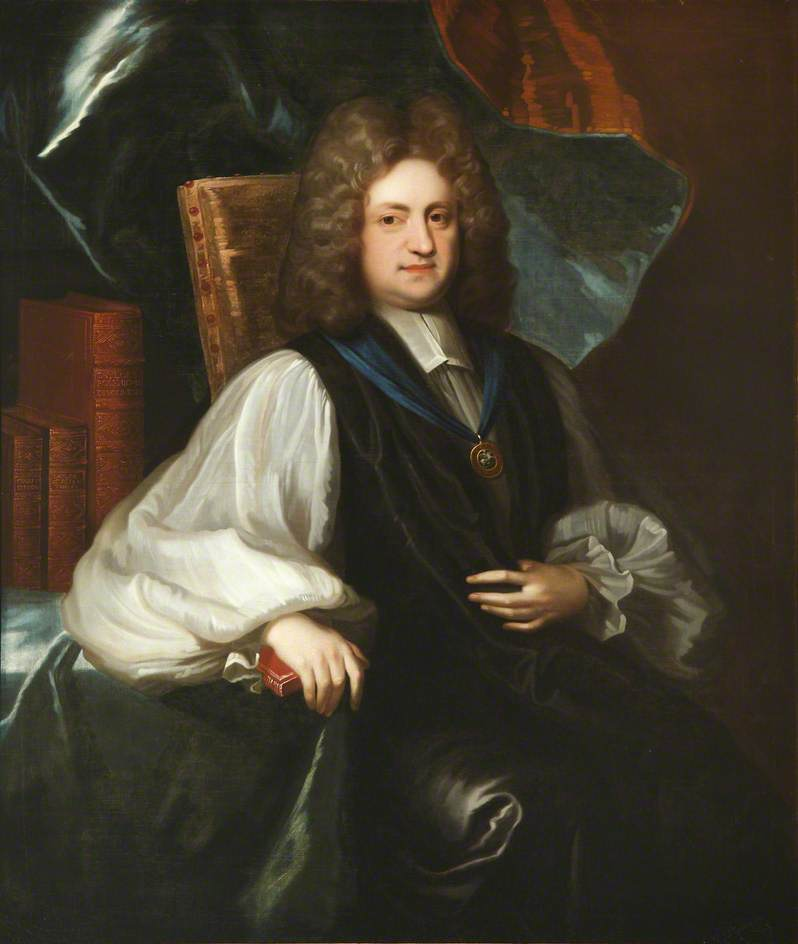
- Contemporary portrait of Trimnell
- Diocese: Diocese of Winchester
- In office: 1721 – 1723 (death)
- Predecessor: Jonathan Trelawny
- Successor: Richard Willis
- Other posts: Archdeacon of Norfolk (1698–1708); Bishop of Norwich (1708–1721)

Orders
- Ordination: 1687 by Thomas Barlow
- Consecration: 8 February 1708 by Henry Compton

Personal details
- Born: 1663
- Died: 15 August 1723 (aged 59–60) Farnham Castle, Surrey, Great Britain
- Buried: Winchester Cathedral
- Denomination: Anglican
- Education: New College, Oxford

Charles Trimnell (1663–1723) was an English Anglican bishop. He was a Whig in politics, and known for his attacks on High Church views, writing on the subordination of the Church of England to the state. After the accession of George I of Great Britain in 1714 he was in the royal favour and influential.

== Family and education ==
He was the son of another Charles Trimnell (c. 1630–1702), rector of Abbots Ripton, Huntingdonshire. Bishop Trimnell was baptised on 1 May 1663 at Abbots Ripton, and had three brothers: William (Dean of Winchester), Hugh (king's apothecary), and David (Archdeacon of Leicester). He was educated at Winchester College and New College, Oxford, where he matriculated on 26 July 1681, and graduated Bachelor of Arts (BA) in 1685 and Master of Arts (Oxford) (MA Oxon) in 1688; he was incorporated at Cambridge in 1695; and proceeded Bachelor of Divinity (BD) and Doctor of Divinity (DD) at Oxford on 4 July 1699. He took orders in the Church of England: he was made deacon on 22 May 1687 and ordained priest on 18 December 1687 — both times by Thomas Barlow, Bishop of Lincoln, at Buckden.

By his wife Henrietta Maria (daughter of William Talbot, Bishop of Durham), he had two sons who died in infancy. She died in 1716, and in 1719 he married Elizabeth (daughter of Sir Edmund Wynne, 2nd Baronet, of Nostell, Yorkshire; and widow of Joseph Taylor of the Temple).

== Early ministry ==
Sir John Trevor, Master of the Rolls, gave him an appointment on his graduation, as preacher of the Rolls Chapel. He travelled to the Netherlands with Robert Spencer, 2nd Earl of Sunderland in 1689; Sunderland was a Roman Catholic convert of the end of the reign of James II, who returned to England in 1691 as an Anglican Whig, employing Trimnell as chaplain at Althorp. Trimnell became rector of Bodington, in Sunderland's gift, in 1694, and of Brington, the local parish of Althorp, in 1696. On 20 July 1698, he was collated Archdeacon of Norfolk, having been a prebendary of Norwich Cathedral since 1691. On becoming archdeacon, he surrendered Bington to his brother-in-law Henry Downes (later Bishop of Derry).

== Queen Anne ==
A royal chaplain to Queen Anne from 1701, he became rector of Southmere in 1704, and of St Giles' Church, Norwich in 1705. He became rector of St James, Westminster in 1706, and Bishop of Norwich in 1708. He was duly consecrated into bishop's orders on 8 February 1708 and retained his parish for one year after. In March 1710 he spoke forcefully in the House of Lords for the impeachment of Henry Sacheverell. He preached in 1712 to the House of Lords what Jonathan Swift called a "terrible Whig sermon" in the Journal to Stella, sufficiently controversial that the Lords declined to thank him and order it printed.

== George I ==
He was in high favour on the accession of George I in 1714 being appointed Clerk of the Closet that same year (until his own death). In 1720, he ensured that Nicholas Thurloe, the vicar of St Mary's Church, Brent Eleigh took responsibility for looking after the substantial library donated by Henry Colman to the church of the village of his birth.

He became Bishop of Winchester in 1721; his translation was effective 21 July. The Black Act 1723 was passed at his instigation, to deter poaching of deer at Bishop's Waltham. He died on 15 August 1723 at Farnham Castle (one of his palaces as Bishop of Winchester), and was buried at Winchester Cathedral on 27 August 1723.

Church of England titles
| Preceded by John Moore | Bishop of Norwich; 1708–1721 | Succeeded by Thomas Green |
| Preceded by Jonathan Trelawny | Bishop of Winchester; 1721–1723 | Succeeded by Richard Willis |
