= William Blund of Lincoln =

William Blund was Archdeacon of Leicester from 1226 to 1229: he was also Chancellor and Precentor of Lincoln Cathedral.

== See also ==
- Diocese of Lincoln
- Diocese of Peterborough
- Diocese of Leicester
- Archdeacon of Leicester
