= Christopher Woodforde =

Priest and author

Christopher Woodforde (29 November 1907-12 August 1962) was an Anglican priest and noted author in the mid 20th century.

Woodforde was born on 29 November 1907 and educated at King's School, Bruton and Peterhouse, Cambridge. Ordained in 1932 he began his ecclesiastical career with curacies at King's Lynn, Louth and Hellesdon. After this he held incumbencies at Exford, Axbridge and Steeple Morden. From 1948 to 1959 he was Fellow and Chaplain at New College, Oxford. In 1959 he was appointed Dean of Wells, a post he held until his death on 12 August 1962 aged 54.

== Works ==
'A Pad in the Straw' pub London by JM Dent & Sons Ltd 1952 illustrated Yunge-Bateman

Church of England titles
Preceded by Frederick Percy Harton	Dean of Wells; 1959–1962	Succeeded by Irven David Edwards
