= Berkeley Cole =

The Venerable Berkeley Cole

Archdeacon of Loughborough
- In office 1953–1963

Archdeacon of Leicester
- In office 1963–1973

Personal details
- Born: 20 October 1913
- Died: 19 July 1996 (aged 82)

The Venerable (Ronald) Berkeley Cole (1913–1996) was an eminent Anglican priest and author in the first half of the mid 20th century.

After an earlier career as a Registrar with the London County Freehold and Leasehold Properties Ltd he was ordained in 1943. He began his career with a curacy in Braunstone after which he was Succentor of Leicester Cathedral. He was Vicar of St Philip, Leicester from 1950 to 1973. He was Archdeacon of Loughborough from 1953 to 1963 and of Leicester from then until 1980. His last post was as Rural Dean of Reps.

== Notes ==
Church of England titles
Preceded by William John Lyon	Archdeacon of Loughborough; 1953–1963	Succeeded by Harold Lockley
Preceded by Irven David Edwards	Archdeacon of Leicester; 1953–1963	Succeeded by Robert David Silk
