= David Newman (priest) =

The Venerable David Newman Archdeacon of Loughborough
- Church: Church of England
- Province: Diocese of Leicester
- In office: 2009 to 2017

Personal details
- Born: 23 August 1954 (age 71)
- Denomination: Anglicanism

David Maurice Frederick Newman (born 23 August 1954) is a Church of England priest and retired Archdeacon of Loughborough.

== Biography ==
Newman was born in Woking on 23 August 1954, educated at Hertford College, Oxford (he gained his MA Oxon) and ordained in 1980. After curacies at Christ Church, Orpington and St Mary's, Bushbury he held incumbencies at All Saints, Ockbrook, Derbyshire, Emmanuel, Loughborough and St Mary-in-Charnwood. He retired effective 27 March 2017.

Church of England titles
Preceded by Paul Hackwood	Archdeacon of Loughborough; 2009–2017	Succeeded by Claire Wood
