= James Bickham =

James Bickham (1719-1785) was a fellow of Emmanuel College, Cambridge, and clergyman, scholar and fifteenth archdeacon of Leicester.

== Background ==
James Bickham was born in Evercreech, Somerset, the son of James Bickham. He was educated at Sherborne, and Emmanuel College, Cambridge, where he obtained a BA in 1741, a Fellowship in 1743, MA in 1744, BD in 1751 and DD in 1774.

== Ecclesiastical career ==
Bickham was admitted to the diaconate by Richard Reynolds, Bishop of Lincoln, at Lincoln Cathedral in 1744, and admitted to priesthood by Thomas Gooch, Bishop of Norwich, in Norwich Cathedral in 1745. He was presented the rectory of Loughborough by his college in 1761, the benefice income of which had been trebled by enclosure awards.

In 1772 Bickham was collated to the archdeaconry by his diocesan John Green, becoming the fifteenth Archdeacon of Leicester. As an archdeacon in the third largest of the six archdeaconries in the vast Lincoln diocese, Dr Bickham played an important role in preserving the fabric of its churches and church buildings. In 18th century England there was considerable concern about the steady decay of church buildings, with ecclesiastical figures such as Bishop Fleetwood and Archbishop Secker predicting that unless more was done to maintain the fabric of churches and the houses of clergy, England would lose many of them in the ensuing century. With the responsibility for the maintenance of churches fell in large part upon parishioners, and of the parsonages on the residing clergy, it was not always easy to persuade those with small incomes to undertake the necessary repairs.

By the 18th century the once powerful archdeacons' courts had been eclipsed, and so whether any action was taken to preserve church buildings depended in large part upon the personal interest and ability of individual archdeacons. Dr Bickham responded enthusiastically to the challenge, and between 1773 and 1779 undertook a great many personal inspections, including 123 parsonage houses, and encouraged clergy and parishioners to undertake necessary remedial work. By great chance, the records of his personal visitations are preserved in the Leicester archdeaconry and today form an important historical source.

Bickham died in 1785 and left a valuable library to the rectory of Loughborough.R
