= Ian Stanes =

The Venerable Ian Thomas Stanes BSc, MA

Archdeacon of Loughborough
- In office 1992–2005

Personal details
- Born: 29 January 1939 (age 87)
- Spouse: Sylvia Alice née Drew

The Venerable Ian Thomas Stanes was an eminent Anglican priest in the second half of the 20th century.

Stanes was educated at Sheffield University and Linacre College, Oxford and ordained in 1966. After a curacy at Holy Apostles, Leicester he was the Vicar of Broom Leys, Coalville. After this he was Priest Warden of Marrick Priory from 1976 to 1982 and the Willesden Area Officer for Mission, Ministry and Evangelism, London for a decade after that. In 1992 he became Archdeacon of Loughborough, a post he held until his retirement in 2005.

== Notes ==
Church of England titles
Preceded by Hughie Jones	Archdeacon of Loughborough; 1992–2005	Succeeded by Paul Colin Hackwood
