= Hugh Barre =

Hugh Barre was the fifth recorded Archdeacon of Leicester: he served from 1148 until his resignation in 1157.

== See also ==
- Diocese of Lincoln
- Diocese of Peterborough
- Diocese of Leicester
- Archdeacon of Leicester
