= Mike Edson =

British Church of England priest

Michael Edson (called Mike; born 2 September 1942) is a British Church of England priest; he was Archdeacon of Leicester from 1994 to 2002.

Edson was educated at the University of Birmingham and the College of the Resurrection, Mirfield. He was ordained deacon in 1972, and priest in 1973. After a curacy at St Peter, Barnstaple he was Team Vicar of Barnstaple from 1977 to 1982. He was Vicar of Roxbourne from 1982 to 1989; and Area Dean of Harrow from 1985 to 1989. He was Warden of Lee Abbey from 1989 to 1994 before his time as Archdeacon of Leicester; and Rector of Torridge afterwards. In retirement, from 2014 to 2015, he was Acting Archdeacon of Barnstaple.
