= John Rogers (archdeacon of Leicester) =

English Anglican priest

The Venerable John Rogers (1648–1715) was an Anglican priest in England.

Rogers was born in London was educated at Merchant Taylors and St John's College, Oxford. He held the livings at Seagrave from 1682; and Archdeacon of Leicester from 1703, holding both positions until his death on 9 May 1715.
