= Richard Ewen =

English priest

Richard Ewen was an English priest in the second half of the 15th century.

Ewen was Archdeacon of Leicester from 1454 to 1458; and Archdeacon of Lincoln from 1458 to 1463.

== See also ==
- Diocese of Lincoln
- Diocese of Peterborough
- Diocese of Leicester
- Archdeacon of Leicester
