= Hughie Jones =

Archdeacon of Loughborough (1927–2016)

The Venerable Hughie Jones
- Archdeacon of Loughborough
- Diocese: Diocese of Leicester
- In office: 1986–1992
- Predecessor: Harold Lockley
- Successor: Ian Stanes

Orders
- Ordination: 1966 (deacon); 1967 (priest)

Personal details
- Born: 15 August 1927 Manchester, Lancashire, United Kingdom
- Died: 25 September 2016 (aged 89)
- Denomination: Anglican
- Spouse: Beryl Joan née Henderson (m. 1949)
- Education: University of Wales

Thomas Hughie Jones (15 August 1927 – 25 September 2016) was a priest in the second half of the 20th century.

Jones was educated at William Hulme's Grammar School and the University of Wales. He was Warden and Lecturer at the Bible Training Institute, Glasgow and Minister of the John Street Baptist Church, Glasgow from 1949 to 1954. Moving to Leicestershire he was Religious Education specialist for the county's schools from 1955 to 1963 and then Senior Lecturer in RE at Leicester College of Education. While there, he was ordained a deacon in 1966 and a priest in 1967. He was Principal of Hind Leys College from 1975 to 1981. After this he was Rector of The Langtons and Stonton Wyville from 1981 to 1986; and the seventh Archdeacon of Loughborough from then until 1992.

Church of England titles
Preceded by Harold Lockley	Archdeacon of Loughborough; 1986–1992	Succeeded by Ian Stanes
