= William Warr =

English Anglican priest

William Warr, D.D. was an English Anglican priest.

Warr was educated at Trinity College, Cambridge. He was ordained in 1617. He held livings at Welbourn, and was Archdeacon of Leicester from 1631 until his death in 1641
