= Percy Harrison =

Percy Harrison may refer to:

- Percy Harrison (footballer) (1902–?), English footballer
- Percy Harrison (cricketer) (1878–1935), English cricketer
