= Walter (Archdeacon of Leicester) =

Walter was the third recorded Archdeacon of Leicester: he served from 1129 to 1134. bold

== See also ==
- Diocese of Lincoln
- Diocese of Peterborough
- Diocese of Leicester
- Archdeacon of Leicester
