= Assheton Pownall (priest) =

Archdeacon of Leicester from 1884 to 1886

The Ven. Assheton Pownall FSA (31 October 1822 – 24 November 1886) was Archdeacon of Leicester from 1884 until his death.

Born in Walton, Liverpool, Pownall was educated at Brasenose College, Oxford. He was Rector of South Kilworth for 39 years, from 1847-1886, succeeding William Pearson. He died in Dover in 1886.

His grandsons were:
1) the military officer and politician Sir Assheton Pownall.
2) Lt Gen. Sir Henry Royds Pownall.
His 1st Cousin was The Reverend Thomas Boultbee

Church of England titles
Preceded by Henry Fearon	Archdeacon of Leicester; 1884–1886	Succeeded by John Mitchinson later Bishop of Barbados
