= Baldric de Segillo =

English archdeacon from 1163 to 1177

Baldric de Segillo was Archdeacon of Leicester from 1163 to 1177.

He was Master of King Stephen's Writing Chamber and a Prebendary of Lincoln Cathedral.

== See also ==
- Diocese of Lincoln
- Diocese of Peterborough
- Diocese of Leicester
- Archdeacon of Leicester
