= Roger Rotherham =

English priest

Roger Rotherham was an English priest in the second half of the 15th century.

Rotherham was born in the West Riding of Yorkshire. He was Warden of King's Hall, Cambridge from 1473 to 1477; Archdeacon of Rochester from 1474 to 1475; and Archdeacon of Leicester from 1474 to 1478.

== See also ==
- Diocese of Lincoln
- Diocese of Peterborough
- Diocese of Leicester
- Archdeacon of Leicester
