= Henry Fearon =

Archdeacon of Leicester (1802–1885)

The Ven. Henry Fearon (20 June 1802, Cuckfield - 13 June 1885, Loughborough) was Archdeacon of Leicester from 1863 until 1884, Rector of Loughborough from 1848 until 1885, and a Fellow of Emmanuel College, Cambridge.

Fearon was born in Ockenden, Cuckfield, Sussex, on 20 June 1802, to The Rev. Joseph Francis Fearon. He was educated at Emmanuel College, Cambridge, at which he received the degrees B.A. in 1824, M.A. in 1827, and B.D. in 1834, and of which he became a Fellow.

He was ordained deacon in 1826 and priest in 1827. He was the Rector of Loughborough from 1848 until his death. He advocated for a clean water supply to the town and paid for the Fearon Fountain, which stands in the marketplace. The Fearon Hall in Loughborough was built by public subscription in his memory.

His brother was John Peter Fearon (1804–1873), who was a lawyer of the Inner Temple and of Great George Street, Westminster, who founded Fearon & Co Solicitors, as Fearon & Clabon, which continues to exist today.

He conducted the marriage of his brother John Peter Fearon (1804–1873) to Jessy/Jessie Burton (1804 - 1844), who was the youngest daughter of the eminent London property developer James Burton, through whom he was the uncle of Constance Mary Fearon, who founded the Francis Bacon Society.

== Notes ==
Church of England titles
Preceded by Thomas Bonney	Archdeacon of Leicester; 1863–1885	Succeeded by Assheton Pownall
