= Francis Meres (Archdeacon of Leicester) =

English priest

Francis Mears was an English priest in the 17th-century.

Meres was educated at Trinity College, Cambridge. He was ordained in 1632. Meres was Headmaster of Uppingham School from 1641 to 1666; and held the livings at Wardley, Teigh and Misterton. He was Archdeacon of Leicester from 1679 until his death on 27 August 1683.
