= William Trimnel =

William Trimnel (died 15 April 1729) was a Church of England clergyman who served as Archdeacon of Norwich around 1720 and as Dean of Winchester from 1722 to 1729. He had three brothers: Charles (Bishop of Norwich and of Winchester), Hugh (king's apothecary), and David (Archdeacon of Leicester).
