= William de Dratton =

William de Dratton was Archdeacon of Leicester from 1232 to 1234: he was also Chancellor he was a native of East Drayton.

== See also ==
- Diocese of Lincoln
- Diocese of Peterborough
- Diocese of Leicester
- Archdeacon of Leicester
