= Barlow, Derbyshire =

Village in Derbyshire, England

Coordinates: 53.268°N 1.484°W

Barlow
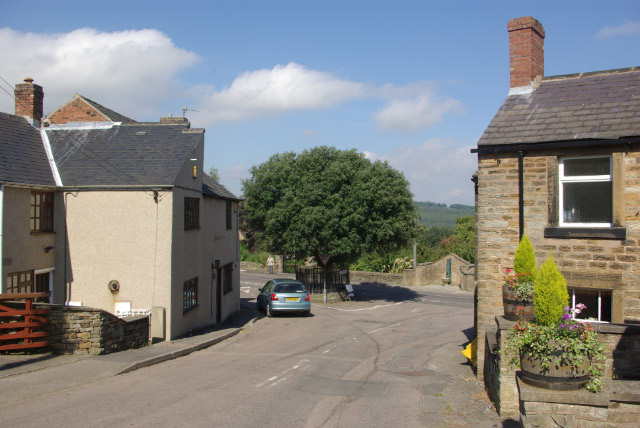
- Barlow village

- Barlow parish highlighted within Derbyshire
- Population: 920 (2011)
- OS grid reference: SK345746
- District: North East Derbyshire
- Shire county: Derbyshire
- Region: East Midlands
- Country: England
- Sovereign state: United Kingdom
- Post town: DRONFIELD
- Postcode district: S18
- Dialling code: 0114
- Police: Derbyshire
- Fire: Derbyshire
- Ambulance: East Midlands

Barlow is a village and civil parish in the North East Derbyshire district of Derbyshire, England. According to the 2001 census the parish had a population of 884, increasing to 920 at the 2011 Census. The village is about 4 miles north-west of Chesterfield.

== Culture ==
The village holds an annual well dressing (on the second Wednesday after the first Sunday in August) and a carnival (on the following Saturday).

== Notable buildings ==
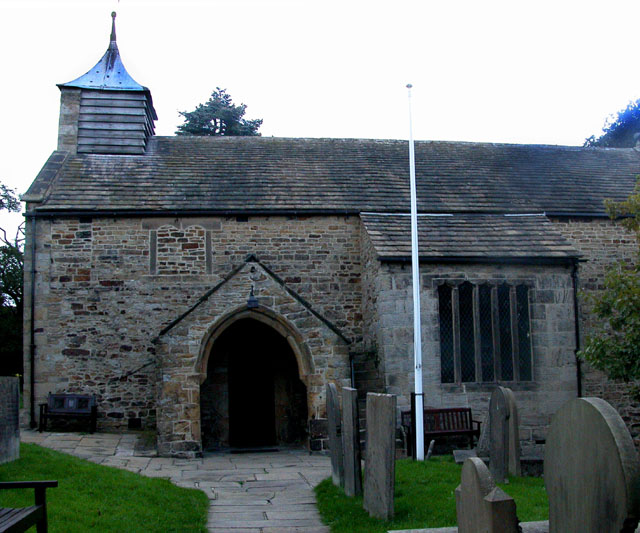
Church of St Lawrence

Barlow's church is dedicated to St Lawrence. Barlow Woodseats Hall, on the edge of the village, is the only manor house in the parish and dates from the 17th century. Amongst the other historical buildings is Lee, or Lea, Bridge, which is a grade II listed early 18th-century packhorse bridge; it has been described as "a substantially complete example of rural bridge 'engineering'".

== Notable residents ==
- William Owtram was born here in 1626.
- Bernie Clifton currently lives here.
- Bess of Hardwick possibly lived in Barlow. Her first husband, Robert Barlow, came from the village and it is possible that Bess lived with him there during their brief marriage and/or with his family there for a short while after his early death.

== See also ==
- Listed buildings in Barlow, Derbyshire
- Barlow Common
- List of places in Derbyshire
