= Listed buildings in Barlow, Derbyshire =

Barlow is a civil parish in the North East Derbyshire district of Derbyshire, England. The parish contains 18 listed buildings that are recorded in the National Heritage List for England. Of these, three are listed at Grade II*, the middle of the three grades, and the others are at Grade II, the lowest grade. The parish contains the village of Barlow and the surrounding countryside, mainly to the west of the village. It is almost entirely rural, and the listed buildings are mainly houses and associated structures, farmhouses and farm buildings. The other listed buildings are a church, its former rectory, a bridge, a former school, a pinfold, and a village pump.

== Key ==
Grade	Criteria
II*	Particularly important buildings of more than special interest
II	Buildings of national importance and special interest

== Buildings ==
Name and location	Photograph	Date	Notes	Grade
St Lawrence's Church; 53.26819°N 1.48536°W		Early 13th century	The church, which has been altered and extended through the centuries, has retained some Norman features, and in 1867 a chancel in matching style was added by Samuel Rollinson. The church is built in sandstone with stone slate roofs, and consists of a nave, a south porch, a south aisle chapel, and a chancel with a north vestry. On the west end is a bellcote with weatherboarding, and a swept lead roof with a finial and a weathervane. The doorways are in Norman style, with semicircular-arched heads. To the right of the porch are external steps, and the chapel contains a five-light Perpendicular window.	II*
Northeast gate piers and wall, Barlow Woodseats Hall; 53.27527°N 1.52627°W	—	Late 16th century (probable)	The gate piers and wall at the northeast entrance to the farmyard are in sandstone. The piers are rectangular in section, and each pier has moulding on the inner face, a blocking course, a moulded cornice, and a ball finial on a tapered stem. Attached to the northeast pier is a section of boundary wall with stepped ridge coping, containing a doorway with a quoined surround.	II
Southeast gate piers, Barlow Woodseats Hall; 53.27484°N 1.52593°W	—	Late 16th century (probable)	The gate piers at the southeast entrance to the farmyard are in sandstone, and rectangular in section. Each pier has moulding on the inner face, a moulded cornice, and a depressed domed top.	II
Farm outbuilding, Barlow Woodseats Hall; 53.27509°N 1.52648°W		Before the 17th century	The farm building has been erected over a period of time, the earliest part having a timber framed core, and it consists of a barn, a cowhouse and stables. It is in sandstone on a plinth, with quoins and stone slate roofs. The building forms an L-shaped plan, with the stables at right angles to the longer range containing the other buildings. Inside the longer range are four substantial cruck trusses.	II*
Barlow Woodseats Hall; 53.27527°N 1.52608°W		1624	A house that has been extended, it is in sandstone, with quoins, and stone slate roofs with coped gables. There are two storeys and attics, and the house consists of three staggered ranges, and a lower two-storey range, all gabled. The main doorway has a chamfered surround, a four-centred arched head, and a lintel. The windows are mullioned or mullioned and transomed.	II*
Barlow Grange; 53.26149°N 1.52556°W		Early 17th century	The house is in sandstone, with quoins, and stone slate roofs with coped gables and moulded kneelers. It consists of three ranges: a single-storey single bay at the northwest, a two-storey middle range, and a lower two-storey three-bay range at the southeast. All the windows are mullioned.	II
Grange House Farmhouse; 53.26522°N 1.50837°W	—	Early 17th century	The farmhouse is in sandstone and has a stone slate roof with coped gables and moulded kneelers. There are two storeys, a double-depth plan, and a front of two bays. The doorway has a rectangular fanlight, and the windows are sashes. At the rear is a full-height central stair window.	II
Outbuilding east of Rumbling Street Farmhouse; 53.27252°N 1.51793°W	—	Early 17th century	The outbuilding, which has a timber framed core, is in sandstone with quoins and a slate roof. There is a single storey, and three bays. Inside there are two cruck trusses.	II
Lees Hall Farmhouse; 53.28338°N 1.49452°W		Mid 17th century	The farmhouse is in sandstone, with quoins, and a Welsh slate roof with coped gables and moulded kneelers. There are two storeys and attics, and a T-shaped plan, with a front of three bays, a two-bay rear wing, and a rear outshut. On the centre is a gabled porch, above which is a two-light mullioned window with a hood mould. The other windows are the front are tripartite sashes, there are mullioned windows elsewhere, and in the east gable end is a doorway with a quoined surround and a lintel.	II
Holme Farmhouse; 53.26920°N 1.51199°W	—	Late 17th century	The farmhouse is in sandstone with quoins, and a roof of Welsh slate and stone slate with coped gables with moulded kneelers. There are two storeys and six bays. The doorway has a quoined surround, above it is a single-light window, and the other windows are mullioned.	II
Bolehill House; 53.26695°N 1.50205°W		1677	Originally a school, it was extended in 1831, and later converted into a private house. It is in sandstone on a chamfered plinth, with quoins, and a stone slate roof with a coped west gable and moulded kneelers. There are two storeys and a T-shaped plan, with a main range of seven bays, the left three bays projecting with a porch in the angle, and at the west end a bay containing a porch; both doorways have a quoined surround. Most of the windows are mullioned and contain lights with Gothic tracery. Above the right doorway is a window with a pointed arch, and over the ground floor openings are continuous hood moulds.	II
Highashes Farmhouse; 53.26413°N 1.51941°W		Early 18th century	The farmhouse is in sandstone with quoins, and a stone slate roof with coped gables and moulded kneelers. There are two storeys and three bays. On the front are two doorways with quoined surrounds and massive lintels, and the windows are mullioned with three lights.	II
Lee Bridge; 53.27530°N 1.48483°W		Early 18th century	The bridge carries a track over Barlow Brook. It was originally a packhorse bridge, and was widened in the 19th century. The bridge is in sandstone, and consists of a single semicircular arch. It has voussoirs, cantilevered parapet walls with coping blocks, and splayed abutments.	II
Rumbling Street Farmhouse; 53.27249°N 1.51815°W	—	c. 1800	A former farmhouse and cottage, now combined, the building is in sandstone with quoins and a roof of stone slate and tile. There are two storeys and four bays. Most of the windows are mullioned.	II
The Old Vicarage; 53.26857°N 1.48587°W	—	1819	The vicarage, later a private house, is in sandstone with a stone slate roof. There are two storeys and an L-shaped plan, with a front of four bays, and a projecting gable at the east end. On the front is an open porch with clustered moulded columns and an entablature. The doorway has a moulded surround, and a flattened triangular head with panelled spandrels. The windows are mullioned, and also have triangular heads with panelled spandrels.	II
Church House; 53.26835°N 1.48459°W	—	Early 19th century	A pair of cottages, later combined, the house is in sandstone with a stone slate roof, two storeys and two bays. The windows are mullioned and contain lights with Gothic tracery. The doorways in the gable ends have deep lintels and canopies on brackets, and have been converted by the insertion of sash windows.	II
Wilkin Hill Pinfold; 53.26588°N 1.48824°W		Early 19th century	The pinfold is enclosed by walls of sandstone with semicircular copings. The doorway has a wooden gate and an inscribed lintel, and to its right is a wooden barred grill.	II
The Main Well; 53.26762°N 1.48431°W		1840	The village water pump is in a walled enclosure. It is in cast iron and in the shape of an obelisk, dated at the head, and with a handle and a spout. In front is a stone trough on a plain pedestal.	II
