= Godfrey (Archdeacon of Leicester) =

Godfrey was the second recorded Archdeacon of Leicester. He was appointed by Robert, Bishop of Lincoln.

== See also ==
- Diocese of Lincoln
- Diocese of Peterborough
- Diocese of Leicester
- Archdeacon of Leicester
