= Richard Maudeley =

English priest

Richard Maudeley, D.D. was an English priest in the 16th century.

Maudeley was educated at Oriel College, Oxford in 1537. He held incumbencies at Sherington and Thame and was appointed Archdeacon of Leicester in 1518.
