= Solomon of Dover =

Solomon of Dover was Archdeacon of Leicester from 1252 to 1274: he was also Prebendary of St Margaret, Leicester in Lincoln Cathedral.

== See also ==
- Diocese of Lincoln
- Diocese of Peterborough
- Diocese of Leicester
- Archdeacon of Leicester
