= Barlow Woodseats Hall =

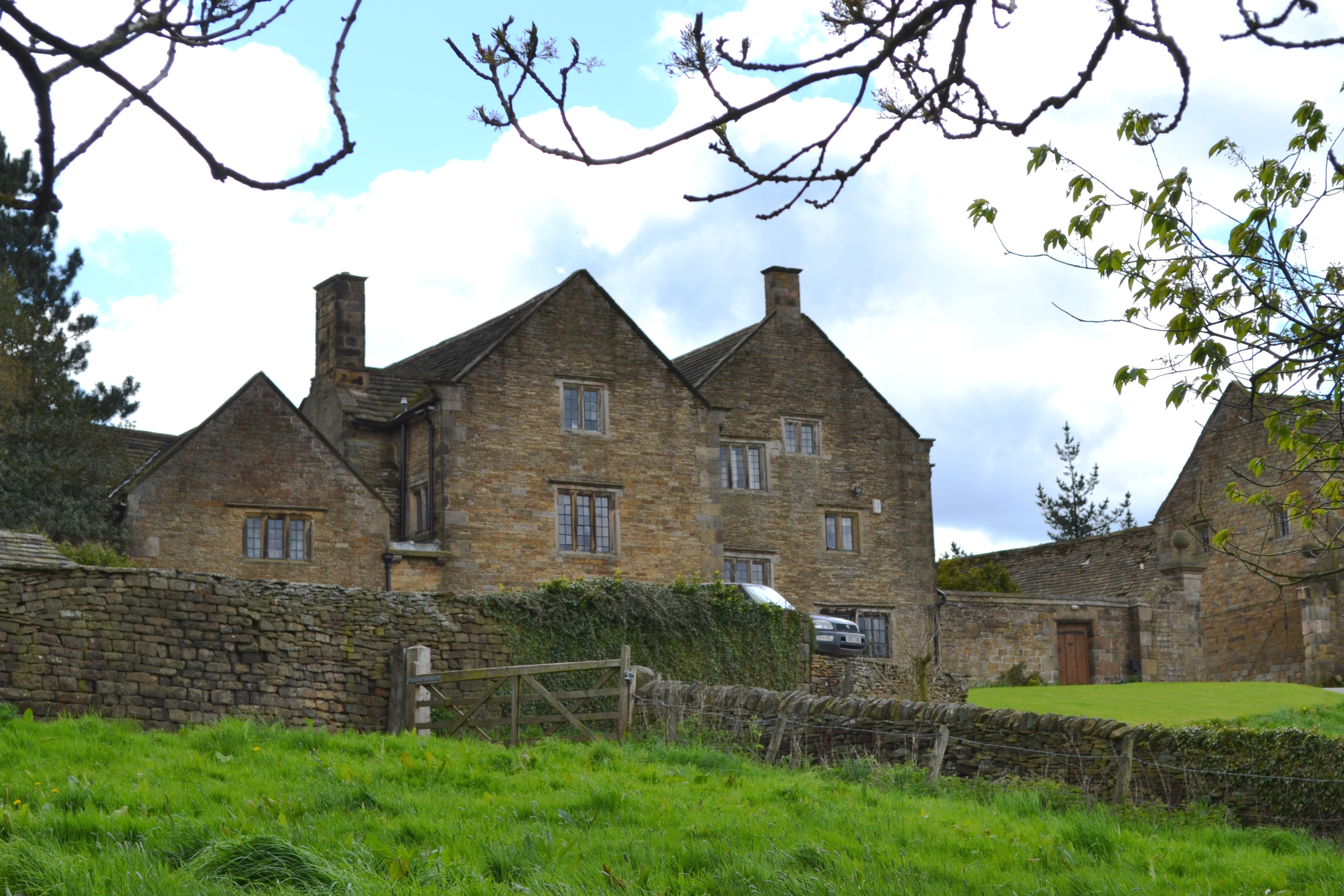
- Barlow Woodseats Hall in 2012

- Location within Derbyshire
- 53°16′14″N 1°31′25″W
- Location: Barlow, England
- OS grid reference: SK318749

History
- Origins: 1269
- Built: 17th century

Site notes
- Architect: Arthur Mower

Listed Building – Grade II

Barlow Woodseats Hall is a Grade II* listed manor house situated at Barlow Woodseats, on the edge of the village of Barlow, in Derbyshire. It remains the only manor house in the Parish of Barlow, and the current house dates from the early 17th century, although there are much earlier origins to before 1269.

== History ==
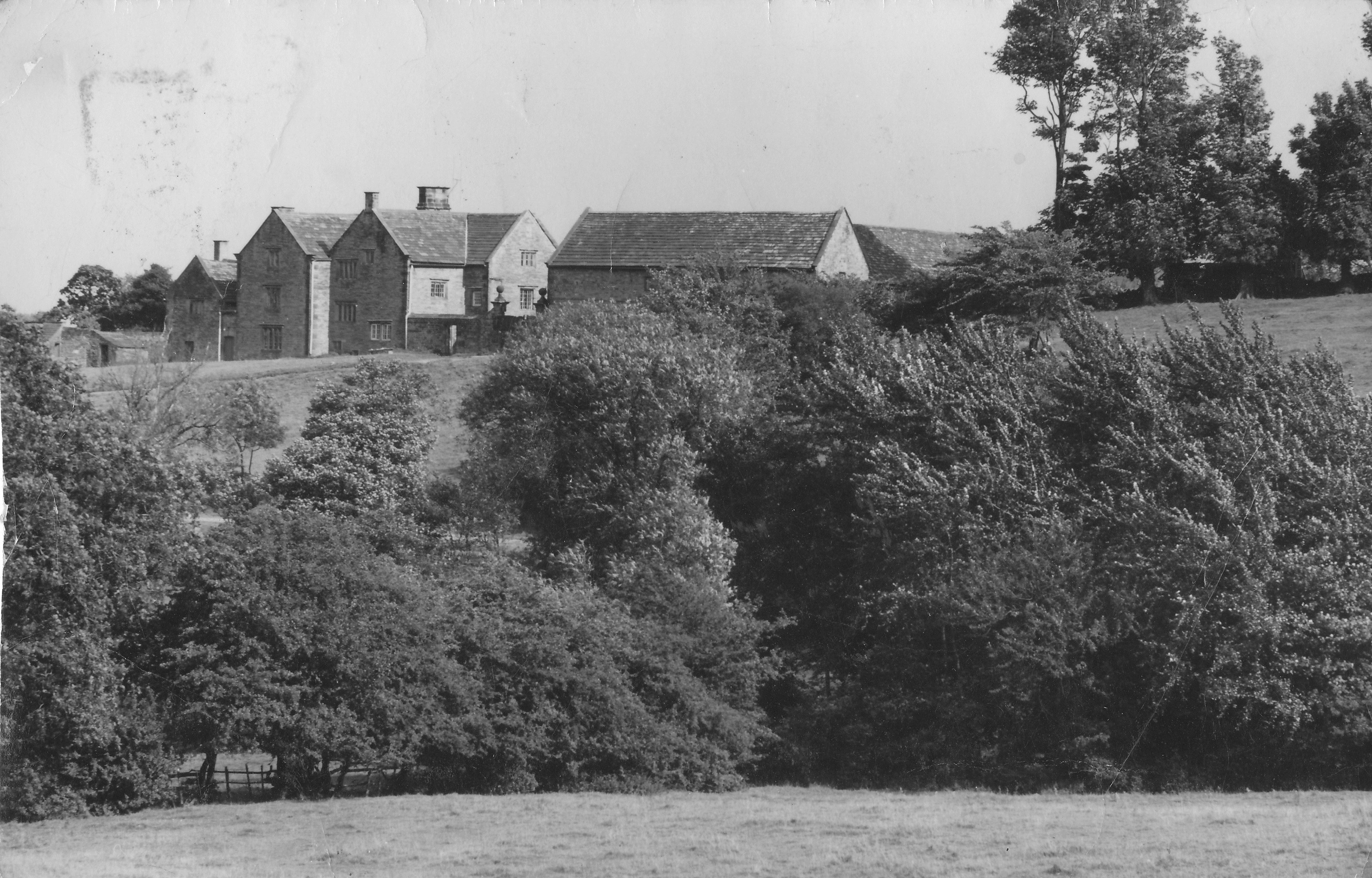
Barlow Woodseats Hall

Manorial tenure began with Ascoit Musard in 1086 and ownership passed through members of several families including the Earl of Shrewsbury from 1593. The present hall dates from the 17th century but there has been a house here from at least 1269 when it was called Barlew Woodsets meaning ‘a house in the wood belonging to Barley’. The deeds dated June 1368 and later dates refer to Barley Wodesetes.

It is also believed to be once occupied by one of Derbyshire's best-known daughters Bess of Hardwick who married the owner of the Hall, Robert Barlow, who died in 1544. This was the first of her four husbands even though she was only 14.

The main house was built by local yeoman Arthur Mower, and it is believed this was around the time he married in 1620. Arthur Mower was appointed Agent to George Barley, Lord of the manor in Barlow in 1563, then on George's death in 1568 to his son Peter Barley. Mower died in 1652 but several generations of his family occupied the house in subsequent years.

The manor of Barlow was held, with Staveley, by the Musards; it was afterwards in the ancient family of Abitot, a branch of which, on settling here, is supposed to have taken their name from the place. The family of Barlow, or Barley, possessed it for several generations.

James Barley, Esq., sold it in 1593, to George Earl of Shrewsbury; the Earl of Newcastle purchased it from the Shrewsbury family in the reign of James I or Charles I. Having passed by descent to the Duke of Portland, it was in 1813 exchanged with the Duke of Rutland for the manor of Whitwell.

In 1843 the house passed to the Thorold family by the marriage of Charlotte Mower. This family can be traced back 900 years to the Sheriff of Lincoln who lived during the reign of Edward the Confessor.

Until 2006 the house had been owned for many years by the Milward family, owners of Milward's Needles. With the death of Rosemary Milward (née Smedley-Aston), a well-respected local medieval historian and wife of Chesterfield surgeon F. John Milward, the house was put on the open market and sold in 2006.

== Property description ==
The house is separate from its ancient cruck barn and farmland. The medieval cruck barn stands to the west side of the farmland, and is believed to be the longest continuous roofed barn in Derbyshire of this age.

Damage was caused to the building by a land mine in April 1941. The comprehensive restoration was carried out to the east wall, and a sheet of paper was discovered behind a wall plate, which was thought to have been left there when the house was built in 1624.

The property is built over four storeys, featuring several separate cellars, ground floor, first floor and extensive attics in the roof. The house, which has eight bedrooms, still retains the very wide fireplaces in both the kitchen (stretching across most of one wall) and the drawing room.

The property is of thinly bedded coursed measured sandstone with ashlar dressings, coped gables, quoins, gable and end ashlar ridge stacks with moulded caps and a stone slated roof. To the north elevation there is a central gabled range with tall chamfer mullioned window set centrally at each floor level beneath a drip mould; the ground floor with four window lights, the second floor with three window lights and the attic floor with two.

The west gable now incorporates a porch internally which appears to be a 17th-century addition. The ground floor rooms retain good 17th-century hearths especially the pleasant kitchen with its wide segmental ashlar arch. The dining room retains chamfered and quoined surrounds to the hearths and has 17th-century square oak panelling.

The staircase with masonry centre wall and oak stairs has a massive oak door at the half landing which is secured from the flight above. At the attic floor level, there are four exposed roof trusses, three of which are braced with collar beams and longitudinal braces.

The house features a garage/coachhouse attached to the main structure, which shows signs of having been a two-storey arrangement at some point in the past. Within the present garage is a single upper cruck truss.

== See also ==
- Grade II* listed buildings in North East Derbyshire
- Listed buildings in Barlow, Derbyshire
