= Claire Wood =

Priest at Church of England

Claire Wood is a Church of England priest and the Archdeacon of Loughborough.

She was born in 1963 and trained for the priesthood via the St Albans & Oxford Ministry Course. She was ordained deacon in 2006, and priest in 2007. After a curacy at St Peter & St Paul, Buckingham she was Rector of St Peter and St Paul Olney, and Area Dean of Newport Pagnell. She was inducted as archdeacon at Leicester Cathedral on 8 October 2017.

Church of England titles
| Preceded by David Newman | Archdeacon of Loughborough; 2017–present | Incumbent |
