= William Owtram =

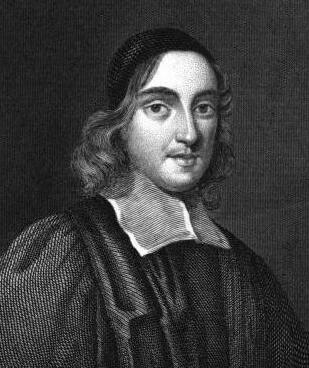
- from his book
- Born: 1626; Barlow, England
- Died: 1679
- Education: Trinity College, Cambridge
- Occupation: Clergyman
- Parent: Robert Owtram

William Owtram D.D. (17 March 1626 – 23 August 1679) was an English clergyman and theologian. He served as the minister of the church of the House of Commons at St Margaret's, Westminster, and later became Archdeacon of Leicester. Owtram was known for his published theological works

== Life ==
Owtram was the son of Robert Owtram and was born at Barlow, near Chesterfield in Derbyshire, on 17 March 1626. On 13 May 1642, he was admitted as a sizar of Trinity College, Cambridge, where he graduated with a B.A. in 1646. He was subsequently elected to a fellowship at Christ's College, Cambridge where he graduated M.A. in 1649. In 1655, he held the university office of junior proctor, and in 1662 he was awarded the degree of D.D.

His first church preferment was in Lincolnshire, after which he obtained the rectory of St. Mary Woolnoth, London, which he resigned in 1666. In 1664, he also served as Minister (but not rector) of St. Margaret's, Westminster. He remained in London during the plague in 1665 On 30 July 1669, he was installed as Archdeacon of Leicester, and on 30 July 1670 he was installed prebendary of Westminster.

== Death ==
Owtram died on 23 August 1679, and was buried in Westminster Abbey, where a monument with a Latin inscription was erected in his memory. His will, dated 5 November 1677, was proved in London 3 September 1679. He bequeathed lands in Derbyshire and Lincolnshire, and left legacies to the children of his deceased brother Francis Owtram, his deceased sisters Barbara Burley and Mary Sprenthall, and his sister Jane Stanley, who was living at the time.

An elaborate catalogue of his library was compiled by William Cooper in London in 1681. Owtram's widow lived for forty-two years after his death, passing on 4 October 1721

== Major works ==
Owtram's principal work is De Sacrificiis libri duo; quorum altero explicantur omnia Judaeorum, nonnulla Gentium Profanarum Sacrificia; altero Sacrificium Christi. Utroque Ecclesiae Catholicae his de rebus Sententia contra Faustum Socinum, ejusque sectatores defenditur, published in London in 1677 and dedicated to Thomas Osborne, Earl of Danby. An English translation, 'Two Dissertations on Sacrifices,' with additional notes and indexes by John Allen, was published in 1817. After his death Joseph Hindmarsh published six under Owtram's name, titled Sermons upon Faith and Providence, and other subjects (London, 1680), but these are considered not genuine

To preserve his authentic work, Owtram's relatives arranged the posthumous publication of Twenty Sermons preached upon several occasions from his original manuscripts, edited by James Gardiner, D.D., later Bishop of Lincoln (2nd ed., London, 1697.
