= Henry Chaddesden =

14th century English priest

Henry Chaddesden was a 14th-century English priest: he was Archdeacon of Leicester from 1347 until his death in 1354.

== See also ==
- Diocese of Lincoln
- Diocese of Peterborough
- Diocese of Leicester
- Archdeacon of Leicester
