= Reimund =

Reimund was a long serving Archdeacon of Leicester; he was first mentioned in 1198 and lastly in 1225.

== See also ==
- Diocese of Lincoln
- Diocese of Peterborough
- Diocese of Leicester
- Archdeacon of Leicester
