= Henry Wilcocks =

English priest

Henry Wilcocks DCL was an English priest in the early 16th-century.

Wilcocks was educated at the University of Oxford. He became Chief Moderator of the Civil Law School at Oxford in 1501 and an advocate of Doctors' Commons in 1511. He held livings at Wood Eaton, Eynsham and Haseley. He became a Canon of Lincoln Cathedral in 1504, Vicar general of the Diocese of Lincoln in 1511 and Archdeacon of Leicester in 1515.
