= Roger de Saxenhurst =

Roger de Saxenhurst was Archdeacon of Leicester from 1275 to 1294: he was also Prebendary of St Margaret, Leicester in Lincoln Cathedral.

== See also ==
- Diocese of Lincoln
- Diocese of Peterborough
- Diocese of Leicester
- Archdeacon of Leicester
