= Hugh Blythe =

Hugh Blythe (also Hugo Blythe) B.D. (died 1610) was a Canon of Windsor from 1572 to 1610 and Archdeacon of Leicester from 1589 to 1591.

== Career ==
He was educated at King's College, Cambridge, where he graduated BA in 1564, MA in 1567, BD.

He was appointed:

- Headmaster of Eton College ca. 1559
- Rector of Appleby, Leicestershire 1572
- Archdeacon of Leicester 1589 - 1591

He was appointed to the sixth stall in St George's Chapel, Windsor Castle in 1572 and held this until he died in 1610.
