= Richard Lavender =

English priest in the late 15th and early 16th centuries

Richard Lavender was an English priest in the late 15th and early 16th centuries.

Lavender was educated at Winchester College and New College, Oxford. He was Archdeacon of Leicester from 1485 until his death in 1508.
