= Ranulph (Archdeacon of Leicester) =

Ranulph was the first recorded archdeacon of Leicester: he was appointed by Remigius, Bishop of Lincoln in 1092.

== See also ==
- Diocese of Lincoln
- Diocese of Peterborough
- Diocese of Leicester
- Archdeacon of Leicester
