= Harold Lockley =

The Venerable Harold Lockley BA, MTh, PhD

Archdeacon of Loughborough
- In office 1963–1986

Personal details
- Born: 16 July 1916
- Died: 26 September 2004 (aged 88)
- Spouse: Ursula Margaret née Wedell

The Venerable Harold Lockley (16 July 1916 – 26 September 2004) was an eminent Anglican priest in the second half of the 20th century.

Lockley was educated at Loughborough College and the University of London and served in the British Royal Navy during World War II. Ordained in 1947, he began his career as Chaplain of his old college. He was then Vicar of Glen Parva from 1951 to 1958 followed by five years as Canon Chancellor of Leicester Cathedral. The Vicar of All Saints, Leicester from 1963 to 1978, he was the sixth Archdeacon of Loughborough from 1963 to 1986.

== Notes ==
Church of England titles
Preceded by Ronald Berkeley Cole	Archdeacon of Loughborough; 1963–1986	Succeeded by Hughie Jones
