= William Doune =

English priest

William Doune was a 14th-century English priest.

Doune was ordained in 1342. He was Archdeacon of Leicester from 1354 until his death in 1361. He was a noted Pluralist. In 1860 his will was discovered, and it shows a man efficient in collecting his dues but whose conscience sometimes troubled him.

== See also ==
- Diocese of Lincoln
- Diocese of Peterborough
- Diocese of Leicester
- Archdeacon of Leicester
