= Barlow Common =

Village in Derbyshire, England

Coordinates: 53.2727°N 1.4960°W

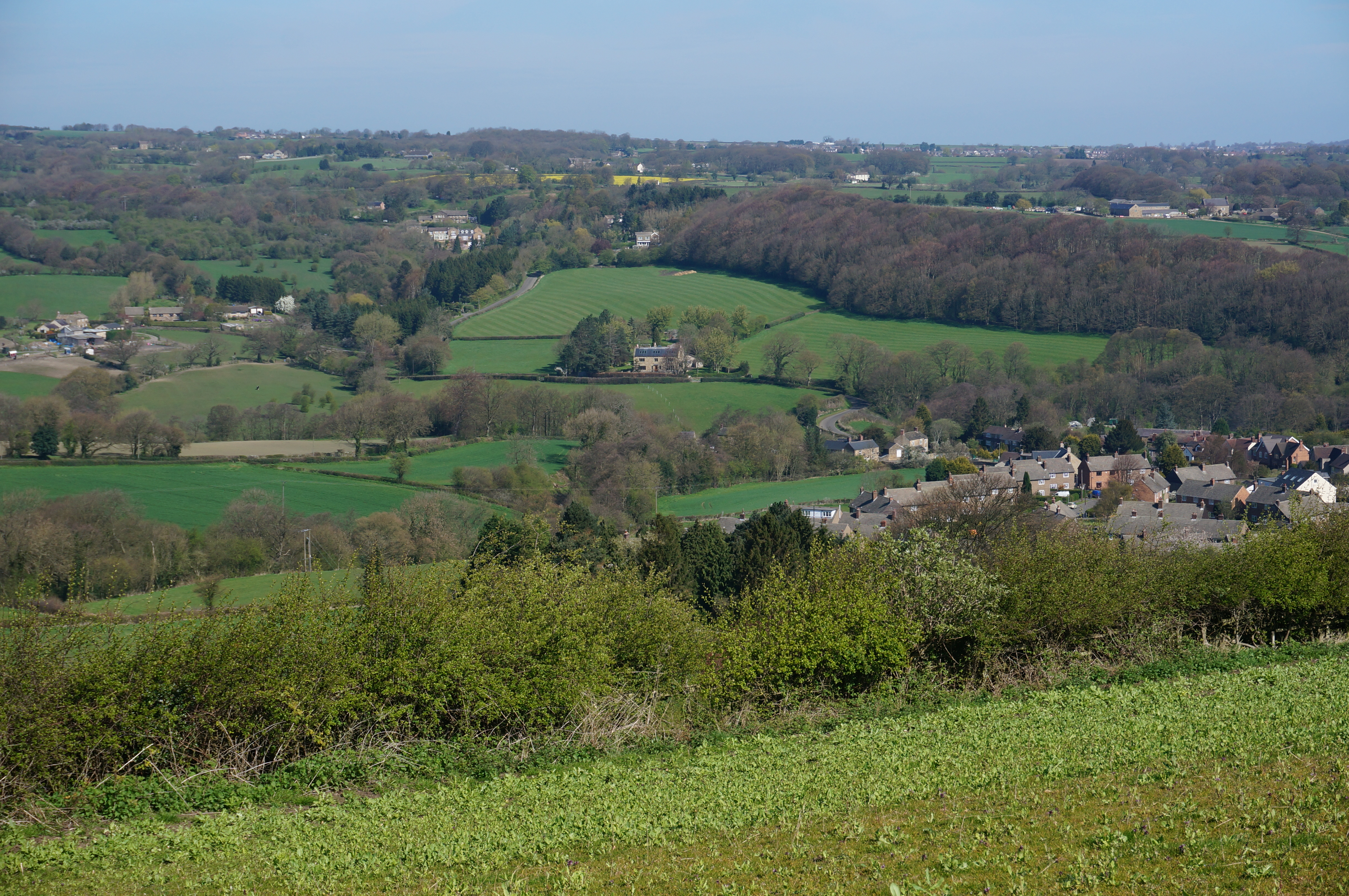
Barlow Common from the south

Barlow Common is a village in Derbyshire, England, near Barlow and Chesterfield. It includes the hamlet of Crowhole, which contains several buildings surviving from the 18th and 19th centuries. These include a bridge, which still has its commemorative plaque stating that it was built in 1831.

== See also ==
- List of places in Derbyshire
