= William Hurrell =

Anglican priest

The Venerable William Philip Hurrell MA

Archdeacon of Loughborough
- In office 1923–1940

Personal details
- Born: 27 January 1860
- Died: 15 July 1952 (aged 92)
- Spouse: Harriette Mary née Aldersey

The Venerable William Philip Hurrell (27 January 1860 – 15 July 1952) was an Anglican priest in the late nineteenth Vicar of Dallington and early 20th centuries.

Hurrell was educated at Charterhouse and Oriel College, Oxford and ordained in 1884. He held curacies at Fen Ditton, Elm and Peterborough. He was Vicar of Northampton from 1892 to 1905, and of Hinckley from then until 1922. He was the third Archdeacon of Loughborough.

== Notes ==
Church of England titles
Preceded by Percy Harris Bowers	Archdeacon of Loughborough; 1923–1940	Succeeded by William John Lyon
