= Thomas Bonney (priest) =

Thomas Kaye Bonney(b Tansor, Northamptonshire, 20 June 1782 - d Normanton, Rutland 7 April 1863) was Archdeacon of Leicester from 22 January 1831 until his death.

The son of Henry Kaye Bonney, Rector of Kings Cliffe, Northamptonshire, he was educated at Clare College, Cambridge. He was ordained in 1807. He held incumbencies at Coningsby, Lincolnshire, and Normanton, Rutland.

== Notes ==
Church of England titles
Preceded by Thomas Parkinson	Archdeacon of Leicester; 1833–1861	Succeeded by Henry Fearon
