= Rushey Green (ward) =

Electoral ward in London, England

- Electoral ward for the Lewisham London Borough Council
- Rushey Green ward boundaries since 2022
- Borough: Lewisham
- County: Greater London
- Population: 14,901 (2021) (Note: 2021 Census data reported for 2022 ward boundaries)
- Electorate: 11,770 (2022)
- Area: 2.054 square kilometres (0.793 sq mi)

Current electoral ward
- Created: 1965
- GSS code: E05013730 (2022–present}

Rushey Green is an electoral ward in the London Borough of Lewisham. The ward covers most of central, northern and western Catford. The population of the ward at the 2011 Census was 14,916. It is also the name of a thoroughfare running north-south through the ward, which is part of the A21 road.

== Lewisham council elections since 2022 ==
There was a revision of ward boundaries in Lewisham in 2022.

=== 2022 election ===
The election took place on 5 May 2022.

2022 Lewisham London Borough Council election: Rushey Green
Party	Candidate	Votes	%	±%
Labour	Louise Krupski	2,421	67.0	
Labour	John Muldoon	2,028	56.1	
Labour	James-J Walsh	1,877	51.9	
Green	Allie Albion	851	23.5	
Green	Florence Murphy	851	23.5	
Green	Alex Cottrell	704	19.5	
Liberal Democrats	Heidi Degen	401	11.1	
Conservative	Felicity Benson	395	10.9	
Conservative	Selina Begum	389	10.8	
Conservative	Frances Thurgood	341	9.4	
Liberal Democrats	George Crozier	311	8.6	
Liberal Democrats	Adrien Smith	278	7.7	
Turnout			32.2	
Labour win (new boundaries)				
Labour win (new boundaries)				
Labour win (new boundaries)				

== 2002–2022 Lewisham council elections ==
There was a revision in ward boundaries in Lewisham in 2002.

=== 2018 election ===
The election took place on 3 May 2018.

=== 2014 election ===
The election took place on 22 May 2014.

=== 2010 election ===
The election on 6 May 2010 took place on the same day as the United Kingdom general election.

=== 2006 election ===
The election took place on 4 May 2006.

=== 2002 election ===
The election took place on 2 May 2002.

== 1978–2002 Lewisham council elections ==
There was a revision in ward boundaries in Lewisham in 1978.
