= William Lyon (priest) =

The Venerable William John Lyon MA

Archdeacon of Loughborough
- In office 1940–1953

Personal details
- Born: 16 January 1883
- Died: 18 March 1961 (aged 78)
- Spouse: Mary Matilda née Rodd

The Venerable William John Lyon (1883–1961) was an eminent Anglican priest in the mid 20th century.

Lyon was educated at Norwich School and Emmanuel College, Cambridge and ordained in 1911. He began his career with curacies at St George, East Stonehouse and St Andrew, Plymouth. He was Priest in charge of St Andrew, Bournemouth from 1915 to 1919; and then its Vicar until 1926. He was Rector of Sutton Coldfield from 1926 to 1931 and then of Handsworth until 1935. He was Rector of Loughborough from 1935 to 1958; and its fourth Archdeacon from 1940 to 1953. He was also the Diocese of Leicesters Canon Theologian from 1940 until his retirement.

== Notes ==
Church of England titles
Preceded by William Philip Hurrell	Archdeacon of Loughborough; 1940–1953	Succeeded by Ronald Berkeley Cole
