= Percy Harrison (footballer) =

English footballer

Personal information
- Full name: Percy Harrison
- Date of birth: 1902
- Place of birth: Huthwaite, England
- Height: 5 ft 8 in (1.73 m)
- Position: Goalkeeper

Senior career*
Years	Team	Apps	(Gls)
1921–1923	Grimsby Town	8	(0)
1923–192?	Denaby United		
- * Club domestic league appearances and goals

Percy Harrison (1902 – after 1922) was an English professional footballer who played as a goalkeeper.
