= Percy Harris (lawyer) =

British barrister and judge (1925–2022)

Percy Harris KC (16 February 1925 – 28 September 2022) was a British barrister and judge.

Following his work on a significant pharmaceuticals case, Harris was elected a bencher of the Middle Temple. He served as a Recorder of the Crown Court for eight years until he was appointed as a circuit judge in 1980.
