= Paul Hackwood =

The Venerable Paul Colin Hackwood BSc, MBA

Archdeacon of Loughborough
- In office 2005–2009
- Monarch: Elizabeth II

Personal details
- Born: 18 February 1961 (age 65) Wednesbury
- Spouse: Rowena Hackwood
- Education: Darlaston Comprehensive

The Venerable Paul Colin Hackwood is a priest in the Church of England and currently a Canon Emeritus at Leicester Cathedral and CEO of Toc H.

Hackwood was born in 1961 and educated at Birmingham University and the Bradford University School of Management. He was ordained in 1990. After a curacy at Little Horton he was the Social Responsibility Advisor for the Diocese of St Albans from 1993 to 1997. Following this he became Vicar of Thornbury; and in 2005 Archdeacon of Loughborough, a post he held for four years.

Hackwood has four children; Tom, Sam, Olly and Ben.

== Notes ==
Church of England titles
Preceded by Ian Thomas Stanes	Archdeacon of Loughborough; 2005–2009	Succeeded by David Maurice Frederick Newman
