= Percy Bowers =

Archdeacon of Loughborough

The Venerable Percy Harris Bowers MA

Archdeacon of Loughborough
- In office 1921–1922

Personal details
- Died: 15 November 1922
- Spouse: Annie née LLoyd

The Venerable Percy Harris Bowers (1856–1922) was an eminent Anglican priest in the late 19th and early 20th centuries.

Bowers was born at Swinton, Lancashire, and baptised 30 July 1856. He was educated at The Forest School and St John's College, Cambridge, graduating BA in 1880. Ordained in 1880, he was Rector of Market Bosworth from 1886 and then Rural Dean of Sparkenhoe; and an Honorary Canon of Peterborough from 1913. He was the second Archdeacon of Loughborough and Warden of the Mission Clergy of the Diocese of Peterborough.

== Notes ==
Church of England titles
Preceded by Charles Estcourt Boucher	Archdeacon of Loughborough; 1921–1922	Succeeded by William Philip Hurrell
