= Archdeacon of Leicester =

Church of England ecclesiastical office

The Archdeacon of Leicester is a senior ecclesiastical officer in the Church of England Diocese of Leicester.

== History ==
The first archdeacon of Leicester is recorded before 1092 – around the time when archdeacons were first appointed in England – in the Diocese of Lincoln. He was one of eight archdeacons appointed by the bishop: Lincoln, Huntingdon, Northampton, Oxford, Buckingham, Bedford and Stow.

In the Victorian era reforms, the archdeaconry became part of Peterborough diocese on 1 May 1839 and, on 12 November 1926, the modern Diocese of Leicester was founded from Leicester and Loughborough archdeaconries and part of the archdeaconry of Northampton.

== List of archdeacons ==
=== High Medieval ===
- bef. 1092–?: Ranulph (first Archdeacon of Leicester)
- Godfrey
- bef. c. 1129–aft. c. 1134: Walter
- bef. c. 1146–1148 (res.): Robert de Chesney
- bef. 1150–bef. 1159 (res.): Hugh Barre
- bef. 1163–aft. 1177: Baldric de Segillo
- c. 1187–1189 (res.): Hamo (afterwards Dean of Lincoln)
- bef. c. 1194–1195 (res.): Roger de Rolleston (afterwards Dean of Lincoln)
- bef. c. 1198–aft. 1224: Reimund
- bef. 1226–aft. 1228: William Blund of Lincoln
- bef. 1229–1232 (res.): Robert Grosseteste
- 1232–1234: William de Dratton
- bef. 1235–1252 (d.): John of Basingstoke
- 1252–bef. 1274: Solomon of Dover
- 1275–bef. 1295 (d.): Roger de Saxenhurst
- 16 January 1295 – 16 September 1310 (d.): Roger Martival

=== Late Medieval ===
- 13 October 1310 – 5 October 1346 (d.): Guillaume Cardinal de Farges (cardinal-deacon of Santa Maria Nova)
- 1346–26 February 1347 (res.): Raynald Orsini
- Arnald de Gavarreto was unsuccessfully provided to the archdeaconry in 1347 and was still claiming it – unsuccessfully – in 1355.
- 1347–bef. 1354 (d.): Henry Chaddesden
- 12 May 1354 – 1361 (d.): William Doune
- bef. 1371–27 August 1372 (d.): Philippe Cardinal de Cabassoles (Cardinal-Bishop of Sabina and Archdeacon of York)
- 1372–13 August 1379 (d.): Giacomo Cardinal Orsini, Dean of Salisbury (cardinal-deacon of San Giorgio in Velabro)
- 1380–2 February 1395 (d.): Poncello Orsini (cardinal-priest of San Clemente; papal claimant, never in actual possession)
- 1390–c. 1390 (res.): John Bottlesham (royal grant)
- 4 August 1392–bef. 1421: John Elvet
- 1392–1392 (rev.): Richard Holland (mistaken royal grant; revoked)
- bef. 1414–1424 (exch.): Richard Elvet
- 29 October 1424–bef. 1430: John Legbourne
- bef. 1430–aft. 1431: Thomas Barnsley
- 14 August 1454 – 1458 (res.): Richard Ewen (afterwards Archdeacon of Lincoln)
- 1458–bef. 1473 (d.): William Witham (also Dean of Arches from 1460 and Dean of Wells from 1467)
- 1473–bef. 1478: Roger Rotherham
- 1478–1479 (res.): John Morton
- 1485–bef. 1508 (d.): Richard Lavender
- 18 March 1508–bef. 1515: William Spark
- 1515–bef. 1518: Henry Wilcocks
- 1518–bef. 1531 (d.): Richard Maudeley
- 25 March 1531–December 1531 (res.): Stephen Gardiner
- 14 December 1531 – 1535 (res.): Edward Foxe
- 9 October 1535 – 1539 (res.): Edmund Bonner
- 24 September 1539–bef. 1541 (d.): William More, Bishop suffragan of Colchester

=== Early modern ===
- 19 February 1541–bef. 1560 (deprived): Thomas Robertson (deprived; also Dean of Durham from 1558, from which point archdeacon in commendam)
- 1560–15 February 1589 (d.): Richard Barber
- 10 May 1589 – 16 September 1590 (res.): Hugh Blythe
- 19 April 1591–bef. 1625 (d.): Robert Johnson
- 1 August 1625–bef. 1631 (d.): Richard Pilkington
- 21 September 1631–bef. 1641 (d.): William Warr
- 16 October 1641 – 1661 (res.): Henry Ferne
- 18 June 1661 – 27 June 1662 (exch.): Robert Hitch (afterwards Archdeacon of the East Riding, 1662 and Dean of York, 1665)
- 27 June 1662–bef. 1669 (d.): Clement Breton
- 30 July 1669 – 23 August 1679 (d.): William Owtram
- 10 September 1679 – 27 August 1683 (d.): Francis Meres
- 5 September 1683–bef. 1703 (d.): Byrom Eaton
- 1703–9 May 1715 (d.): John Rogers
- 17 May 1715 – 18 May 1756 (d.): David Trimnel
- 7 July 1756 – 29 August 1772 (d.): John Taylor
- 17 December 1772 – 23 December 1785 (d.): James Bickham
- 25 January 1786 – 9 March 1812 (d.): Andrew Burnaby
- 31 March 1812 – 13 November 1830 (d.): Thomas Parkinson
- 22 January 1831 – 7 April 1863 (d.): Thomas Bonney

Upon the death of Herbert Marsh on 1 May 1839, Leicester archdeaconry become part of the Diocese of Peterborough.

=== Late modern ===
- 1863–1884 (ret.): Henry Fearon
- 1884–1886 (d.): Assheton Pownall
- 1886–1899 (ret.): John Mitchinson (former Bishop of Barbados then of the Windward Islands)
- 1899–1920 (ret.): John Stocks
- 1921–1938 (ret.): Frederick MacNutt

From 12 November 1926, the archdeaconry formed part of the new Leicester diocese.

- 1938–1956 (ret.): Cecil Matthews (afterwards archdeacon emeritus)
- 1956–1963 (res.): Irven Edwards
- 1963–1980 (ret.): Berkeley Cole (afterwards archdeacon emeritus)
- 1980–1994 (res.): David Silk
- 1994–2002 (res.): Mike Edson
- 2002–April 2012 (res.): Richard Atkinson
- 2012 – 8 September 2018 (res.): Tim Stratford (became Dean of Chester)
- 4 November 2018 – 2025 (res.): Richard Worsfold (resigned to become Area Dean of Salford and Leigh, 23 September 2025)
- 2 October 2025 – present: Richard Trethewey
