= Assheton Pownall =

British politician

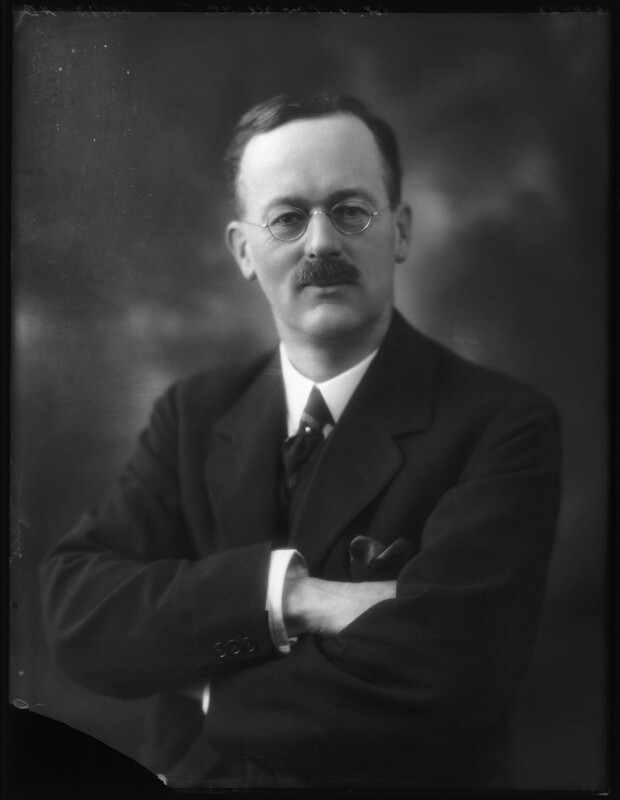
Assheton Pownall

Lieutenant-Colonel Sir Assheton Pownall OBE TD DL (3 October 1877 – 29 October 1953) was a British Conservative Party politician who served as member of parliament for Lewisham East from 1918 to 1945.

Pownall was born in Warwick, Warwickshire, the son of civil engineer Charles Assheton Whately Pownall and Dora Bourne Royds. He was the grandson of the Ven. Assheton Pownall, Archdeacon of Leicester. Pownall was educated at Rugby School.

He began his political career sitting on the London County Council for Lewisham from 1907 to 1910. In the General elections of January and December 1910, he ran unsuccessfully for Rotherhithe. After the First World War, when he served with the 20th Battalion, The London Regiment, he was elected for Lewisham East in 1918. In the 1919 Birthday Honours, he was appointed an officer of the Order of the British Empire in recognition of services in connection with the war.

Pownall was noted for his arduous work on committees. Pownall was knighted in the 1926 Birthday Honours, for political and public services.

During the late 1930s, Pownall was a member of the Anglo-German Fellowship. He belonged to the moderate tendency within the Fellowship, stating that it existed "only to promote good relations between us and Germany" and was in no way in favour of Nazism.

Parliament of the United Kingdom
| New constituency | Member of Parliament for Lewisham East; 1918–1945 | Succeeded by Herbert Morrison |
