= Irven Edwards =

English anglican priest (1907–1973)

Irven David Edwards (19 November 1907 – 14 February 1973) was an Anglican priest in the mid 20th century.

Edwards was born at Stretton, East Staffordshire, the son of John Edwards, at one time a prebendary of Lichfield Cathedral, and his wife Beatrice. He was educated at Repton School and Christ's College, Cambridge. Ordained in 1935 he began his ordained ministry as chaplain of Christ's College, Cambridge. He was also general secretary of the Advisory Council for Training for the Ministry from 1935 to 1944. In 1940, he became rector of Milton, Hampshire and in 1947 vicar of Norton, County Durham. He became vicar of All Saints's Leicester and Archdeacon of Leicester in 1956. In 1963 he was appointed Dean of Wells, a position he held until his death in 1973.

In 1938, Edwards married Diana Vernon Douglas Crick, the daughter of Douglas Crick, Bishop of Chester.

Church of England titles
Preceded by Christopher Woodforde	Dean of Wells; 1963–1973	Succeeded by Patrick Mitchell
